= Koteshwar (mountain) =

Mountain in Uttarakhand, India

Koteshwar I
- Location within Uttarakhand

Highest point
- Elevation: 6,080 m (19,950 ft)
- Coordinates: 30°57′48″N 79°06′20″E

Geography
- Location: Uttarakhand, India
- Parent range: Garhwal Himalaya

Climbing
- First ascent: "In 1972? a Calcutta based group claimed a mistaken first ascent of this peak".

Koteshwar I is a mountain of the Garhwal Himalaya in Uttarakhand, India. The elevation of Koteshwar I is 6,080 metres (19,948 ft). It is the 161st highest peak in Uttrakhand. Nanda Devi, is the highest mountain in this category. It lies close to Sudarshan Parbat 6,507 metres (21,348 ft) in the south. It has two approach route one from Thely Bamak and another from Swetvarn Bamak. Its nearest higher neighbor Sudarshan Parbat 6,507 metres (21,348 ft) lies 1.3 km North. It is located 5 km SW of Yogeshwar 6,678 metres (21,909 ft) and 3.2 km east lies Shyamvarn 6,135 metres (20,128 ft).

== Climbing history ==
In 1978 A ten-member team from Diganta West Bengal was led by Ashok K. Roy Chowdhury. On September 24 they made their Base Camp at 15,500 feet at the junction of the Raktavarn and Thelu glaciers. Camps I at 17,500 feet and camp II at 18,200 feet were established on September 26 and 28. On September 29 Chowdhury, Samarenda N. Dhar, Ranjan K. Mondai, Robin Banerjee, Amitava Majundar, Sherpas Mingma and Pasang Tsering and high-altitude porter Dawa reached the summit of Koteswar. A team from west Bengal while claiming the first ascent of Sudarshan Parbat mistakenly climbed Koteshwar according to J C Nanavati of Indian Mountaineering Foundation (IMF). "In 1972? a Calcutta based group claimed a mistaken first ascent of this peak. They had climbed only Koteshwar - 2000 ft lower".

== Glaciers and rivers ==
Koteshwar lies in between two glaciers. On the eastern side lies Swetvarn Glacier and on the western side lies Thelu Glacier. Both these glaciers join Raktavarn Glacier on the south. Finally Raktvarn drains itself at Gangotri Glacier near Gomukh and from there emerges as the Bhagirathi River one of the main tributaries of river Ganga. River Bhagirathi later joins Alaknanda River at Dev Pryag and becomes Ganga there after.

== Neighboring peaks ==
Neighboring peaks of Koteshwar:

- Sri Kailash: 6,932 m (22,743 ft)31°01′03″N 79°10′39″E
- Chirbas Parbat 6,529 metres (21,421 ft)31°02′03″N 79°03′09″E
- Matri 6,721 metres (22,051 ft)31°00′53″N 79°04′11″E
- Sudarshan Parbat 6,507 metres (21,348 ft)30°58′37″N 79°05′36″E
- Kalidhang 6,373 metres (20,909 ft)31°02′40″N 79°01′20″E
- Yogeshwar: 6,678 m (21,909 ft)30°59′56″N 79°07′03″E
- Thelu: 6,000 m (19,685 ft)

== See also ==
- List of Himalayan peaks of Uttarakhand
