= Trimukhi Parbat =

Mountain in Uttarakhand, India

- Location within Uttarakhand

Highest point
- Elevation: 6,422 m (21,070 ft)
- Prominence: 269 m (883 ft)
- Coordinates: 31°02′06″N 79°11′42″E

Geography
- Location: Uttarakhand, India
- Parent range: Garhwal Himalaya

Climbing
- First ascent: On June 27, 1994 An Indian Army team, led by Major Bhajan Singh Bisht, climbed Trimukhi Parbat.

Trimukhi Parbat is a mountain of the Garhwal Himalaya in Uttarakhand India.The elevation of Trimukhi Parbat is 6,422 metres (21,070 ft) and its prominence is 269 metres (883 ft). It is 99th highest located entirely within the Uttrakhand. Nanda Devi, is the highest mountain in this category. It lies 2.8 km NE of Sri Kailash 6,932 metres (22,743 ft) its nearest higher neighbor and 1.9 km south of Trimukhi East 6,280 metres (20,604 ft). It lies 7.9 km North of Pilapani Parbat 6,796 metres (22,297 ft). It is located 8.3 km NE of Yogeshwar 6,678 metres (21,909 ft) and 16.4 km east lies Tara 6,069 metres (19,911 ft).

== Climbing history ==
An Indian Army team, led by Major Bhajan Singh Bisht, climbed Trimukhi Parbat (6422 meters, 21,070 feet) on June 27, 1994. this was the first ascent of this peak. They approached through the Jadhganga valley via Bhairon Ghati. Before that they climbed Nandi (5795 meters, 19,012 feet), and then East Trimukhi Parbat (6280 meters, 20,604 feet). These were second ascents of these peaks since they had been climbed by Harish Kapadia and Monish Devjani in 1990. The peak was climbed by Bisht, Lance Naiks Arjun Dev, Hardiyal Singh, Har Mohan Singh and Mohinder Singh and Havildar Atma Singh. A team comprising Harish Kapadia Monesh Devjani and supported by Pasang Bodh and Yograj Buruwa of Manali. venture in this area in May 1990 after J. B. Auden visited the area in 1939. They climbed P 5794 and Trimukhi East but realized that Trimukhi Parbat is difficult for there small party.

== Neighboring and subsidiary peaks ==
neighboring or subsidiary peaks of Trimukhi Parbat:

- Sri Kailash: 6,932 m (22,743 ft)31°01′03″N 79°10′39″E
- Pilapani Parbat: 6,796 m (22,297 ft)30°57′57″N 79°12′45″E
- Sudarshan: 6,507 m (21,348 ft)30°38′57″N 79°05′36″E
- Mana Parbat I: 6,794 m (22,290 ft)30°56′59″N 79°14′30″E
- Chaturbhuj 6,654 metres (21,831 ft)30°59′41″N 79°05′37″E
- Matri 6,721 metres (22,051 ft)31°00′53″N 79°04′11″E
- Sudarshan Parbat 6,507 metres (21,348 ft)30°58′37″N 79°05′36″E
- Kalidhang 6,373 metres (20,909 ft)31°02′40″N 79°01′20″E

== Glaciers and rivers ==
On the Eastern side, Trimukhi Glacier on the western side and Lambigad Glacier both this glacier drains down to Jadh Ganga which also met Bhagirathi river near Bharionghati. Bhagirathi joins the Alaknanda River the other main tributaries of river Ganga at Dev Prayag and called Ganga there after.

== See also ==
- List of Himalayan peaks of Uttarakhand
