= Saife =

Mountain in Uttarakhand, India

- Location within Uttarakhand

Highest point
- Elevation: 6,161 m (20,213 ft)
- Coordinates: 30°57′52″N 79°05′59″E

Geography
- Location: Uttarakhand, India
- Parent range: Garhwal Himalaya

Climbing
- First ascent: "Diganta", a mountaineering club from Calcutta in 1978.

Saife is a mountain of the Garhwal Himalaya in the Indian state of Uttarakhand.

== Geography ==
It is the 147th highest location within Uttrakhand. Nanda Devi is the highest mountain in this category. It lies 1.5 km SSE of Sudarshan Parbat 6,507 metres (21,348 ft) its nearest higher neighbor. Shyamvarn 6,135 metres (20,128 ft) lies 2.5 km ENE and it is 2.4 km south of Shwetvarna 6,340 metres (20,801 ft). It lies 4.4 km SSW of Yogeshwar 6,678 metres (21,909 ft).

== History ==
It was first climbed by Diganta, a mountaineering club from Calcutta, in 1978. In 1981 an eleven-member Indo-French expedition led by Harish Kapadia attempted Sudarshan and six other peaks surrounding the Swetvarn Bamak. On 19 May, Hubert Odier made a solo ascent. From ABC he proceeded on to the western glacier and climbed the snow slopes to the ridge connecting Saife with Koteshwar I. At 8.50 AM. he was on the summit. It was again summited on 30 May by Kanu, Danthi, and Kami. They followed the route to the summit earlier taken by Odier. On 7 June a third attack was made by Alain and Jacques. They started from ABC at 4 AM., reached the top at 6.30 AM., and were back in camp at 8.30 AM for breakfast.

== Neighboring and subsidiary peaks ==
Neighboring or subsidiary peaks of Saife:

- Kalidhang 6,373 metres (20,909 ft)31°02′40″N 79°01′20″E
- Yogeshwar 6,678 m (21,909 ft)30°59′56″N 79°07′03″E
- Chaturbhuj 6,654 metres (21,831 ft)30°59′41″N 79°05′37″E
- Matri 6,721 metres (22,051 ft)31°00′53″N 79°04′11″E
- Swetvarn 6,340 metres (20,801 ft)30°59′12″N 79°05′54″E

== Glaciers and rivers ==
Swetvarn Bamak is on the eastern side. Thelu bamak is on the Southern side of these glaciers. They are tributaries of Raktvarn Bamak, which drain at Gangotri Glacier. Bhagirathi river emerges from there. It is one of the main tributaries of Ganga. It later joins Alaknanda River, the other main tributary of Ganga at Devprayag, which became Ganga.

== See also ==
- List of Himalayan peaks of Uttarakhand
