= Chaturangi =

Mountain in Uttarakhand, India

- Location within Uttarakhand

Highest point
- Elevation: 6,407 m (21,020 ft)
- Listing: Mountains of Uttarakhand
- Coordinates: 30°55′51″N 79°12′25″E

Geography
- Location: Uttarakhand, India
- Parent range: Garhwal Himalaya

Chaturangi is a mountain of the Garhwal Himalaya in Uttarakhand India.The elevation of Chaturangi is 6,407 metres (21,020 ft). It is 102nd highest located entirely within the Uttrakhand. Nanda Devi, is the highest mountain in this category. It is situated in the Gangotri National Park. It lies 3.9 km south of Pilapani Parbat 6,796 metres (22,297 ft) its nearest higher neighbor. It is 5.1 km SW of Mana Parbat II 6,771 metres (22,215 ft) and it lies 11.2 km SE of Yogeshwar 6,678 metres (21,909 ft).

== Climbing history ==
In 1974 A team from Kolkata climbed Chaturangi on September 27. The team was composed of Jahar Guha Thakurta, Debu P. Bhattacharjee, B.S. Negi and Sherpa Kami.

In 1980 Toyo University Alpine Club, from Japan led by Kenshiro Ohtaki. The other members in the team Kimimasa Miwa, Mutsuo Ominato, Fumihide Saito, Yoshiharu Ohta and Junichi Endo. On October 18 camp I was set up at 15,425 ft (4,702 m). On October 20 they set up Camp II at 16,075 feet below the south ridge of Chaturangi. On October 22 Camp III at 19,000 feet. On October 27 Miwa, Ominato and Ohta started at seven A.M. and reached the summit at three P.M. On October 29, Ohtaki, Saito and Junichi Endo also reached the summit at 1:35 in the afternoon.

== Neighboring and subsidiary peaks ==
Neighboring or subsidiary peaks of Chaturangi:

- Mana Parbat I: 6,794 m (22,290 ft)30°56′59″N 79°14′30″E
- Kalindi peak: 6,102 m (20,020 ft)30°55′20″N 79°16′48″E
- Pilapani Parbat: 6,796 m (22,297 ft)30°57′57″N 79°12′45″E
- Chandra Parbat I: 6,739 m (22,110 ft)30°52′19″N 79°15′25″E
- Satopanth:7,075 m (23,212 ft)30°50′42″N 79°12′45″E
- Vasuki Parbat: 6,792 m (22,283 ft)30°52′30″N 79°10′30″E
- Bhagirathi Parbat III: 6,454 m (21,175 ft)30°52′09″N 79°08′01″E

== Glaciers and rivers ==
On the southern side lies Chaturangi Glacier which later joins Gangotri Glacier. From the snout of Gangotri Glacier emerges Bhagirathi River one of the main tributaries of river Ganga. At Dev Prayag it merges with Alaknanda River the other main tributaries of river Ganga.and called Ganga there after.
