= P. 6504 =

Mountain in Uttarakhand, India

- Satopanth West
- Location within Uttarakhand

Highest point
- Elevation: 6,504 m (21,339 ft)
- Coordinates: 30°49′41″N 79°09′29″E

Geography
- Location: Uttarakhand, India
- Parent range: Garhwal Himalaya

Climbing
- First ascent: Rajiv Gandhi Memorial Athanium Club from Madras climbed it in June 1994.

P. 6504 is a mountain of the Garhwal Himalaya in Uttarakhand, India. It is also known as Satopanth West. It is situated in the Gangotri National Park. The elevation of P. 6504 is 6,504 metres (21,339 ft). It is joint 88th highest located entirely within the Uttrakhand. Nanda Devi, is the highest mountain in this category. It lies 3 km SSE of Bhagirathi Parbat I 6,856 metres (22,493 ft). Satopanth 7,075 metres (23,212 ft) lies 5.8 km ENE and it is 6.7 km WNW of Swachhand 6,721 metres (22,051 ft). It lies 8.1 km ENE of Kedarnath Dome 6,831 metres (22,411 ft).

== Climbing History ==
A 23-member team from Madras including 15 climbers of the Rajiv Gandhi Memorial Athanium Club, was led by R. Gopi and K. Pradip. Climbed this virgin peak in three batches in the middle of June 1994. They have named the peak Rajiv.

In 1985 an Alpine Climbing Group team comprising Andrew Perkins, Jerry Hadwin, Neil McAdie, Andy Scrase attempted the first ascent of P 6504, which is the western summit of Satopanth give up the expedition because of bad weather.

== Neighboring peaks ==
Neighboring peaks of P. 6504:

- Swachhand: 6,721 m (22,051 ft)30°48′34″N 79°13′27″E
- Satopanth: 7,075 m (23,212 ft)30°50′42″N 79°12′45″E
- Chandra Parbat I: 6,739 m (22,110 ft)30°52′19″N 79°15′25″E
- Bhagirathi Parbat I: 6,856 m (22,493 ft)30°51′00″N 79°08′57″E
- Vasuki Parbat: 6,792 m (22,283 ft)30°52′30″N 79°10′30″E
- Bhagirathi Parbat III: 6,454 m (21,175 ft)30°52′09″N 79°08′01″E
- Mana Parbat II: 6,771 m (22,215 ft)30°57′05″N 79°15′15″E
- Kalindi Peak: 6,102 m (20,020 ft)30°55′20″N 79°16′48″E
- Pilapani Parbat: 6,796 m (22,297 ft)30°57′57″N 79°12′45″E

== Glaciers and rivers ==
Gangotri Glacier on the western side, from the snout of Gangotri glacier which is called Gomukh emerges the Bhagirathi River, the main tributaries of the river Ganga that later joins Alaknanda River the other main tributaries of the river Ganga at Devprayag and became Ganga there after.

== See also ==
- List of Himalayan peaks of Uttarakhand
