= Atal II =

Mountain in Uttarakhand, India

- P. 6557
- Location within Uttarakhand

Highest point
- Elevation: 6,557 m (21,512 ft)
- Listing: Mountains of Uttarakhand
- Coordinates: 30°59′51″N 79°09′04″E

Geography
- Location: Uttarakhand, India
- Parent range: Garhwal Himalaya

Climbing
- First ascent: In October 2018, Atal I was climbed by Nehru Institute of Mountaineering led by Colonel Amit Bisht, principal N.I.M.

Atal II is a mountain of the Garhwal Himalaya in Uttarakhand India. Earlier it was known as P.6557. It was renamed after a team from the N.I.M Nehru Institute of Mountaineering climbed four unnamed peaks and named it after former Prime Minister Atal Bihari Vajpayee, according to Colonel Amit Bisht, principal of the N.I.M. The peak lies above the Shyamvarn Glacier. The elevation of Atal II is 6,557 metres (21,512 ft). It is joint 74th highest located entirely within the Uttrakhand. Nanda Devi is the highest mountain in this category. It lies 6 km ENE of Sudarshan Parbat 6,507 metres (21,348 ft). Swetvarn 6,340 metres (20,801 ft) lies 5.1 km WSW and it is 5.5 km east of Chaturbhuj 6,654 metres (21,831 ft). It lies 2.9 km ESE of Yogeshwar 6,678 metres (21,909 ft).

== Climbing history ==
Atal II was climbed by Nehru Institute of Mountaineering led by Colonel Amit Bisht, principal N.I.M.in October 2018. The expedition was flagged off from Dehradun on October 4 by Chief Minister Trivendra Singh Rawat. The expedition was jointly conducted by N.I.M. and the tourism department of Uttarakhand.

== Neighboring and subsidiary peaks ==
Neighboring or subsidiary peaks of Atal II:

- Shyamvarn 6,135 metres (20,128 ft)30°58′34″N 79°07′40″E
- Sudarshan Parbat 6,507 metres (21,348 ft)30°58′37″N 79°05′36″E
- Yogeshwar 6,678 m (21,909 ft)30°59′56″N 79°07′03″E
- Chaturbhuj 6,654 metres (21,831 ft)30°59′41″N 79°05′37″E
- Matri 6,721 metres (22,051 ft)31°00′53″N 79°04′11″E
- Swetvarn 6,340 metres (20,801 ft)30°59′12″N 79°05′54″E
- Kalidhang 6,373 metres (20,909 ft)31°02′40″N 79°01′20″E

== Glaciers and rivers ==
Shyamvarn bamak on the western side. Nilamber Glacier on the eastern side both these Glaciers are tributaries of Raktvarn Bamak which drain itself at Gangotri Glacier. From the snout of Gangotri Glacier which was called Gomukh emerges Bhagirathi river. one of the main tributaries of river Ganga that later joins Alaknanda River the other main tributaries of river Ganga at Devprayag and became Ganga there after.
