= Chandra Parbat South =

Mountain in Uttarakhand, India

- Chandra Parbat III
- Location within Uttarakhand

Highest point
- Elevation: 6,557 m (21,512 ft)
- Prominence: 115 m (377 ft)
- Coordinates: 30°51′31″N 79°15′18″E

Geography
- Location: Uttarakhand, India
- Parent range: Garhwal Himalaya

Chandra Parbat South is a mountain of the Garhwal Himalaya in Uttarakhand India. It's the lowest among three peak's in the Chandra Massif. It is situated in the Gangotri National Park. The elevation of Chandra Parbat (South) is 6,557 metres (21,512 ft) and its prominence is 115 metres (377 ft). It is joint 74th highest located entirely within the Uttrakhand. Nanda Devi, is the highest mountain in this category. It lies 1.3 km SSW of Chandra Parbat I 6,739 metres (22,110 ft) its nearest higher neighbor. Satopanth 7,075 metres (23,212 ft) lies 4.1 km WSW and it is 6.2 km NNE of Swachhand 6,721 metres (22,051 ft). It lies 7.7 km east of Vasuki Parbat South 6,702 metres (21,988 ft).

== Neighboring peaks ==
Neighboring peaks of Chandra Parbat south:

- Chandra Parbat I: 6,739 m (22,110 ft)30°52′19″N 79°15′25″E
- Swachhand: 6,721 m (22,051 ft)30°48′34″N 79°13′27″E
- Mana Parbat II: 6,771 m (22,215 ft)30°57′05″N 79°15′15″E
- Kalindi peak: 6,102 m (20,020 ft)30°55′20″N 79°16′48″E
- Pilapani Parbat: 6,796 m (22,297 ft)30°57′57″N 79°12′45″E
- Satopanth: 7,075 m (23,212 ft)30°50′42″N 79°12′45″E

== Glaciers and rivers ==
It is surrounded by glaciers on both the sides Suralaya Glacier on the western side, sweta Bamak on the northern side, Both the glacier joins with Chaturangi Glacier and that later joins with Gangotri Glacier from there emerges the Bhagirathi River the main tributaries of river Ganga that later joins Alaknanda River the other main tributaries of river Ganga at Devprayag and became Ganga there after. The word "Bamak" is used for Glacier.

== See also ==
- List of Himalayan peaks of Uttarakhand
