= Chandra Parbat II =

Mountain in Uttarakhand, India

- Chandra Parbat NW
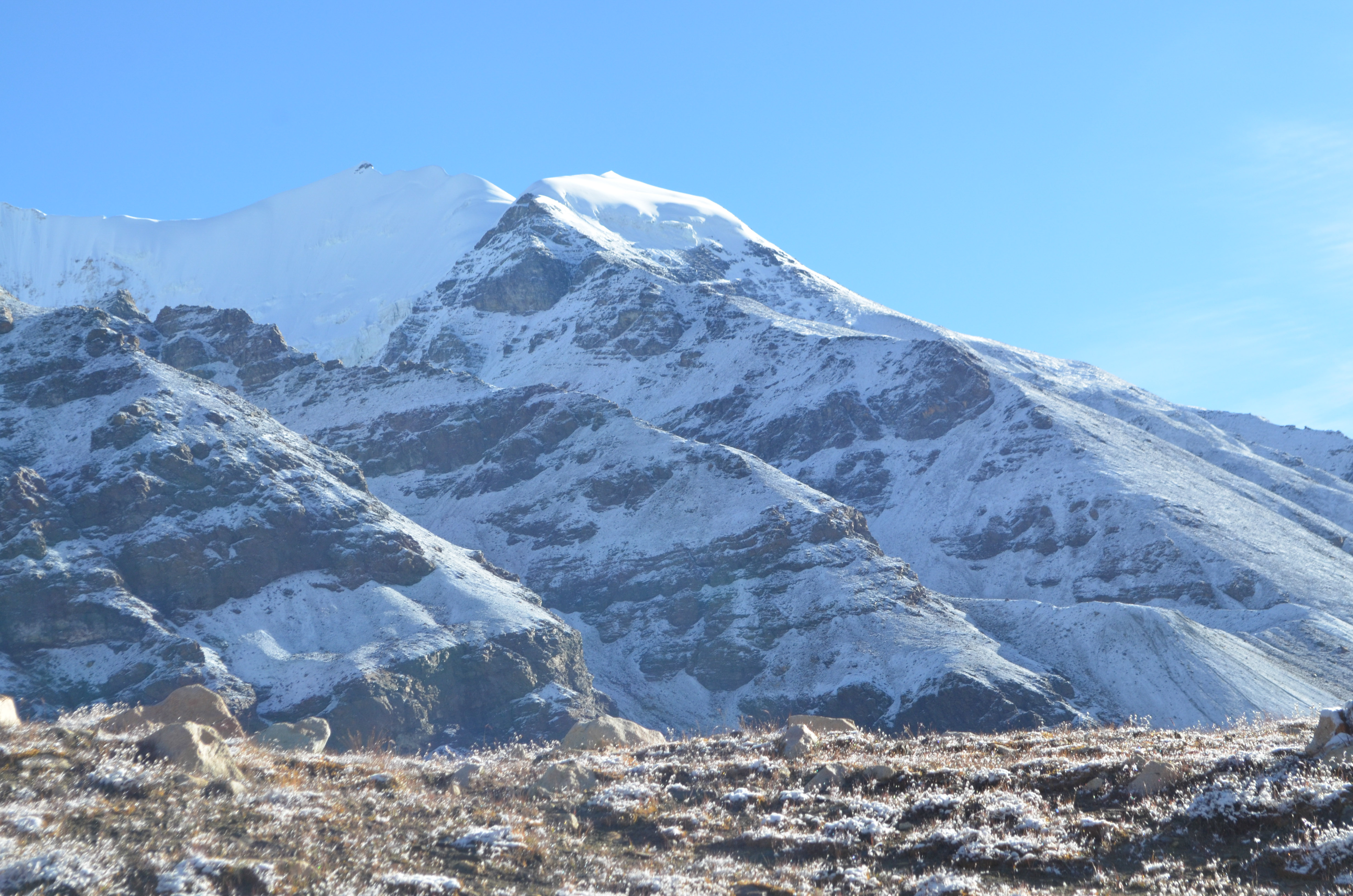
- Chandra Parbat II in the background

Highest point
- Elevation: 6,728 m (22,073 ft)
- Prominence: 406 m (1,332 ft)
- Coordinates: 30°52′54″N 79°14′48″E

Geography
- Location within Uttarakhand
- Location: Uttarakhand, India
- Parent range: Garhwal Himalaya

Climbing
- First ascent: In 1938, a six-member Austrian team led by Prof. R. Schwarzgruber, had made the first ascent of Chandra Parbat II

Chandra Parbat II (Hindi:चन्द्रा पर्वत II) is a mountain of the Garhwal Himalaya in Uttarakhand, India. Chandra Parbat II standing majestically at 6,728 metres (22,073 ft). It is 44th highest located entirely within the Uttrakhand. Nanda Devi, is the highest mountain in this category. Chandra Parbat II lies between the Suralaya and Sweta Glaciers. It lies on the eastern bank of the Suralaya Glacier. It is located 1.6 km NW of Chandra parbat I 6,739 metres (22,110 ft) and 6.8 km west lies Vasuki Parbat 6,792 metres (22,283 ft). On the 8.3 km SWS lies the Swachhand Peak 6,721 metres (22,051 ft) and Bhgirathi Massif on the west side.

== Climbing History ==
In 1938, a six-member Austrian team led by Prof. R. Schwarzgruber, had made the first ascent of Chandra Parbat I. Frauenberger and Spannraft reached the top on 11 September 1938 following the west ridge.

An Indian Air Force team led by Pilot Officer Raju climbed Chandra Parbat I in 1965.

An Indian team of the Indo-Tibetan Border Police reached the summit on 29 September 1974.

== Glaciers and rivers ==
It is surrounded by glaciers on both the sides Suralaya Glacier on the western side, sweta Bamak on the eastern side, Both the glacier joins with Chaturangi Glacier and Chaturangi Glacier joins with Gangotri Glacier from there emerges the river Bhagirathi the main tributaries of river Ganga.

== Neighboring peaks ==
Neighboring peaks of Chandra Parbat II:

- Chandra Parbat I:: 6,794 m (22,290 ft)30°52′19″N 79°15′25″E
- Mana Parbat I: 6,794 m (22,290 ft)30°56′59″N 79°14′30″E
- Mana Parbat II: 6,771 m (22,215 ft)30°57′05″N 79°15′15″E
- Kalindi peak: 6,102 m (20,020 ft)30°55′20″N 79°16′48″E
- Pilapani Parbat: 6,796 m (22,297 ft)30°57′57″N 79°12′45″E
- Satopanth: 7,075 m (23,212 ft)30°50′42″N 79°12′45″E

== See also ==
- List of Himalayan peaks of Uttarakhand
