= List of mountain peaks of Uttarakhand =

Uttarakhand is a Himalayan state of India. This mountainous state contains, in its northern section, some of the highest mountain peaks in the world. Many of them are unclimbed; many are unnamed. A large number of peaks in Uttarakhand are still not open for climbing due to security reasons, as this region borders Tibet Autonomous Region of the People's Republic of China.

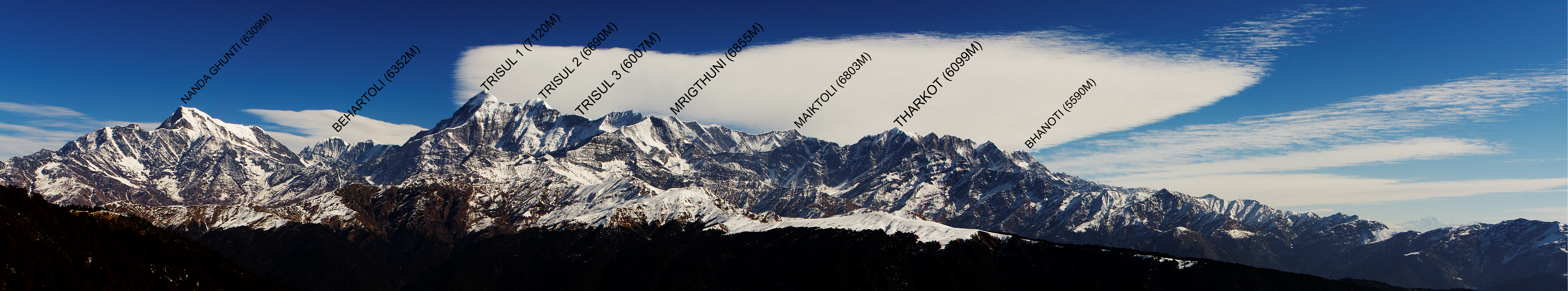
Panorama of a few Garhwal Peaks

== Highest major summits ==
Following is a list of highest peaks of Uttarakhand with elevation over 6,000 m (19,700 ft). Of the highest major summits of Uttarakhand, 2 peaks exceed 7,500 m (24,600 ft), 13 other peaks exceed 7,000 m (23,000 ft), further 89 peaks exceed 6,500 m (21,300 ft) and at least 100 other peaks exceed 6,000 m (19,700 ft) in elevation.

Mountain peaks of Uttarakhand with elevation of 6000 meters and above
Name	Region	District	Coordinates	Altitude		Range
Name	Region	District	Coordinates	m	ft	Range
Nanda Devi	Garhwal	Chamoli	30°22′33″N 79°58′15″E	7,817	25,646	Nanda Devi
Kamet	Garhwal	Chamoli	30°55′12″N 79°35′30″E	7,756	25,446	Kamet
Sunanda Devi	Kumaon–Garhwal	Chamoli–Pithoragarh	30°22′00″N 79°59′40″E	7,434	24,390	Nanda Devi
Abi Gamin	Garhwal	Chamoli	30°55′57″N 79°36′09″E	7,355	24,131	Kamet
Mana Peak	Garhwal	Chamoli	30°52′50″N 79°36′55″E	7,272	23,858	Kamet
Mukut Parbat	Garhwal	Chamoli	30°56′57″N 79°34′12″E	7,242	23,760	Kamet
Hardeol	Kumaon–Garhwal	Chamoli–Pithoragarh	30°33′36″N 80°00′39″E	7,151	23,461	Nanda Devi
Chaukhamba I	Garhwal	Uttarkashi–Chamoli	30°44′59″N 79°17′28″E	7,138	23,419	Gangotri
Trisul I	Garhwal	Chamoli	30°18′36″N 79°46′12″E	7,120	23,360	Nanda Devi
Mana North West	Garhwal	Chamoli	30°53′37″N 79°35′57″E	7,092	23,268	Kamet
Satopanth	Garhwal	Uttarkashi	30°50′42″N 79°12′45″E	7,075	23,212	Gangotri
Tirsuli	Kumaon–Garhwal	Chamoli–Pithoragarh	30°34′48″N 80°01′12″E	7,074	23,209	Nanda Devi
Dunagiri	Garhwal	Chamoli	30°30′54″N 79°52′00″E	7,066	23,182	Nanda Devi
Chaukhamba II	Garhwal	Uttarkashi–Chamoli	30°44′08″N 79°16′49″E	7,058	23,156	Gangotri
Tirsuli West	Garhwal	Chamoli	30°34′12″N 80°00′00″E	7,035	23,081	Nanda Devi
Rishi Pahar	Kumaon–Garhwal	Chamoli–Pithoragarh	30°31′48″N 79°59′24″E	6,992	22,940	Nanda Devi
Chaukhamba III	Garhwal	Uttarkashi–Chamoli–Rudraprayag	30°43′26″N 79°16′31″E	6,974	22,881	Gangotri
Kedarnath Peak	Garhwal	Uttarkashi–Rudraprayag	30°47′42″N 79°04′10″E	6,940	22,769	Gangotri
Saraswati Parbat I	Garhwal	Chamoli	31°01′54″N 79°30′06″E	6,940	22,769	Kamet
Sri Kailash	Garhwal	Uttarkashi	31°01′03″N 79°10′39″E	6,932	22,743	Gangotri
Kalanka	Garhwal	Chamoli	30°30′12″N 79°56′30″E	6,931	22,740	Nanda Devi
Saf Minal	Garhwal	Chamoli	30°31′43″N 79°58′01″E	6,911	22,674	Nanda Devi
Chamrao Parbat I	Garhwal	Chamoli	30°59′24″N 79°31′45″E	6,910	22,671	Kamet
Thalay Sagar	Garhwal	Uttarkashi–Tehri Garhwal	30°51′29″N 78°59′50″E	6,904	22,651	Gangotri
Panchchuli II	Kumaon	Pithoragarh	30°12′49″N 80°25′33″E	6,903	22,648	Panchchuli
Changabang	Garhwal	Chamoli	30°30′00″N 79°55′37″E	6,864	22,520	Nanda Devi
Nanda Kot	Kumaon	Pithoragarh–Bageshwar	30°16′48″N 80°04′12″E	6,861	22,510	Nanda Devi
Bhagirathi Parbat I	Garhwal	Uttarkashi	30°51′00″N 79°08′57″E	6,856	22,493	Gangotri
Deoban	Garhwal	Chamoli	30°52′04″N 79°39′00″E	6,855	22,490	Kamet
Mrigthuni	Kumaon–Garhwal	Chamoli–Bageshwar	30°17′24″N 79°49′47″E	6,855	22,490	Nanda Devi
Chaukhamba IV	Garhwal	Uttarkashi–Rudraprayag	30°43′27″N 79°15′24″E	6,854	22,487	Gangotri
Kedarnath Dome	Garhwal	Uttarkashi	30°48′31″N 79°04′44″E	6,831	22,411	Gangotri
Janhukut	Garhwal	Uttarkashi	30°46′42″N 79°14′30″E	6,805	22,326	Gangotri
Maiktoli	Kumaon–Garhwal	Chamoli–Bageshwar	30°16′24″N 79°52′18″E	6,803	22,320	Nanda Devi
P. 6803	Garhwal	Uttarkashi	31°00′27″N 79°07′44″E	6,803	22,320	Gangotri
Pilapani Parbat	Garhwal	Uttarkashi	30°57′57″N 79°12′45″E	6,796	22,297	Gangotri
Mana Parbat I	Garhwal	Uttarkashi	30°56′59″N 79°14′30″E	6,794	22,290	Gangotri
Vasuki Parbat	Garhwal	Uttarkashi	30°52′30″N 79°10′30″E	6,792	22,283	Gangotri
Devtoli	Kumaon–Garhwal	Chamoli–Bageshwar	30°17′09″N 79°51′12″E	6,788	22,270	Nanda Devi
Saraswati Parbat II	Garhwal	Chamoli	31°00′51″N 79°30′30″E	6,775	22,228	Kamet
Bhrigupanth	Garhwal	Uttarkashi	30°52′50″N 79°00′10″E	6,772	22,218	Gangotri
Mana Parbat II	Garhwal	Uttarkashi	30°57′05″N 79°15′15″E	6,771	22,215	Gangotri
Satopanth South West	Garhwal	Uttarkashi	30°50′12″N 79°11′53″E	6,770	22,211	Gangotri
Chamrao Parbat II	Garhwal	Chamoli	30°57′57″N 79°32′53″E	6,760	22,178	Kamet
Chandra Parbat I	Garhwal	Uttarkashi	30°52′19″N 79°15′25″E	6,739	22,110	Gangotri
Mana Parbat III	Garhwal	Uttarkashi	30°57′12″N 79°13′04″E	6,730	22,080	Gangotri
Chandra Parbat II	Garhwal	Uttarkashi	30°52′54″N 79°14′48″E	6,728	22,073	Gangotri
Hathi Parbat	Garhwal	Chamoli	30°41′06″N 79°42′21″E	6,727	22,070	Kamet
Matri	Garhwal	Uttarkashi	31°00′53″N 79°04′11″E	6,721	22,051	Gangotri
Swachhand	Garhwal	Uttarkashi–Chamoli	30°48′34″N 79°13′27″E	6,721	22,051	Gangotri
Lambigad Parbat	Garhwal	Uttarkashi	31°01′23″N 79°07′16″E	6,715	22,031	Gangotri
Gauri Parbat	Garhwal	Chamoli	30°42′40″N 79°42′03″E	6,708	22,008	Kamet
Vasuki Parbat South	Garhwal	Uttarkashi	30°51′33″N 79°10′29″E	6,702	21,988	Gangotri
Trisul II	Garhwal	Chamoli	30°17′24″N 79°46′12″E	6,690	21,949	Nanda Devi
P. 6684	Garhwal	Uttarkashi–Chamoli	30°49′22″N 79°14′23″E	6,684	21,929	Gangotri
Devistan I	Garhwal	Chamoli	30°20′24″N 79°52′48″E	6,678	21,909	Nanda Devi
Yogeshwar	Garhwal	Uttarkashi	30°59′56″N 79°07′03″E	6,678	21,909	Gangotri
Gangotri I	Garhwal	Uttarkashi	30°55′04″N 78°50′49″E	6,672	21,890	Gangotri
P. 6666	Garhwal	Uttarkashi–Chamoli	30°50′07″N 79°14′15″E	6,666	21,870	Gangotri
Panwali Dwar	Kumaon–Garhwal	Chamoli–Bageshwar	30°17′22″N 79°57′21″E	6,663	21,860	Nanda Devi
Meru Peak	Garhwal	Uttarkashi	30°52′05″N 79°01′56″E	6,660	21,850	Gangotri
Chaturbhuj	Garhwal	Uttarkashi	30°59′41″N 79°05′37″E	6,654	21,831	Gangotri
P. 6651	Garhwal	Chamoli	30°57′03″N 79°37′13″E	6,651	21,821	Kamet
Devi Mukut	Garhwal	Chamoli	30°18′37″N 79°52′21″E	6,648	21,811	Nanda Devi
P. 6635	Garhwal	Chamoli	30°35′13″N 79°58′45″E	6,635	21,768	Nanda Devi
Jaonli	Garhwal	Uttarkashi–Tehri Garhwal	30°51′15″N 78°51′17″E	6,632	21,759	Gangotri
Deo Damla	Kumaon–Garhwal	Chamoli–Pithoragarh	30°27′36″N 80°01′09″E	6,620	21,719	Nanda Devi
Kharchakund	Garhwal	Uttarkashi	30°46′50″N 79°07′44″E	6,612	21,693	Gangotri
Nanda Khat	Kumaon–Garhwal	Chamoli–Bageshwar	30°18′04″N 79°58′36″E	6,611	21,690	Nanda Devi
Nilkantha	Garhwal	Chamoli	30°43′48″N 79°24′20″E	6,596	21,640	Gangotri
P. 6596	Kumaon–Garhwal	Chamoli–Bageshwar	30°17′52″N 79°56′42″E	6,596	21,640	Nanda Devi
Gangotri II	Garhwal	Uttarkashi	30°54′23″N 78°51′21″E	6,590	21,621	Gangotri
P. 6587 I	Garhwal	Uttarkashi	31°00′27″N 79°10′39″E	6,587	21,611	Gangotri
P. 6587 II	Garhwal	Uttarkashi	31°00′29″N 79°11′48″E	6,587	21,611	Gangotri
Bhartekunta	Garhwal	Uttarkashi–Rudraprayag–Tehri Garhwal	30°50′39″N 79°02′05″E	6,578	21,581	Gangotri
Gangotri III	Garhwal	Uttarkashi	30°52′57″N 78°52′05″E	6,577	21,578	Gangotri
Manda II	Garhwal	Uttarkashi	30°55′34″N 78°59′55″E	6,568	21,549	Gangotri
Mangraon	Kumaon–Garhwal	Chamoli–Pithoragarh	30°28′31″N 80°00′40″E	6,568	21,549	Nanda Devi
Atal I	Garhwal	Uttarkashi	30°59′18″N 79°09′05″E	6,565	21,539	Gangotri
P. 6565	Garhwal	Uttarkashi	31°00′33″N 79°04′42″E	6,565	21,539	Gangotri
Chiring We	Kumaon	Pithoragarh	30°25′12″N 80°18′00″E	6,559	21,519	Panchchuli
Mandir Parbat	Garhwal	Chamoli	30°49′40″N 79°36′14″E	6,559	21,519	Kamet
Atal II	Garhwal	Uttarkashi	30°59′51″N 79°09′04″E	6,557	21,512	Gangotri
Chandra Parbat South	Garhwal	Uttarkashi–Chamoli	30°51′31″N 79°15′18″E	6,557	21,512	Gangotri
P. 6547	Garhwal	Chamoli	30°31′00″N 79°57′47″E	6,547	21,480	Nanda Devi
Shivling	Garhwal	Uttarkashi	30°52′37″N 79°03′56″E	6,543	21,467	Gangotri
Rajrambha	Kumaon	Pithoragarh	30°15′00″N 80°22′12″E	6,539	21,453	Panchchuli
P. 6538	Garhwal	Chamoli	30°18′47″N 79°56′58″E	6,538	21,450	Nanda Devi
P. 6535	Garhwal	Chamoli	30°58′59″N 79°40′00″E	6,535	21,440	Kamet
Ganesh Parbat	Garhwal	Chamoli	30°58′21″N 79°43′03″E	6,532	21,430	Kamet
P. 6532	Garhwal	Uttarkashi–Chamoli	30°52′18″N 79°16′21″E	6,532	21,430	Gangotri
Chirbas Parbat	Garhwal	Uttarkashi	31°02′03″N 79°03′09″E	6,529	21,421	Gangotri
Devistan II	Garhwal	Chamoli	30°20′58″N 79°52′50″E	6,529	21,421	Nanda Devi
Manda III	Garhwal	Uttarkashi	30°54′18″N 79°00′01″E	6,529	21,421	Gangotri
P. 6526	Garhwal	Uttarkashi–Chamoli	30°50′31″N 79°14′59″E	6,526	21,411	Gangotri
P. 6523	Garhwal	Chamoli	30°31′37″N 79°53′50″E	6,523	21,401	Nanda Devi
Bidhan Parbat	Garhwal	Chamoli	30°51′48″N 79°40′49″E	6,520	21,391	Kamet
Bhagirathi Parbat II	Garhwal	Uttarkashi	30°52′55″N 79°08′01″E	6,512	21,365	Gangotri
Chaudhara	Kumaon	Pithoragarh	30°16′48″N 80°22′12″E	6,510	21,358	Panchchuli
Manda I	Garhwal	Uttarkashi	30°56′25″N 78°59′55″E	6,510	21,358	Gangotri
P. 6507	Garhwal	Chamoli	31°01′52″N 79°27′36″E	6,507	21,348	Kamet
Sudarshan Parbat	Garhwal	Uttarkashi	30°58′37″N 79°05′36″E	6,507	21,348	Gangotri
Gorur Parbat	Garhwal	Chamoli	30°36′19″N 79°58′03″E	6,504	21,339	Nanda Devi
P. 6504	Garhwal	Uttarkashi	30°49′41″N 79°09′29″E	6,504	21,339	Gangotri
Dunagiri East	Garhwal	Chamoli	30°31′59″N 79°54′45″E	6,489	21,289	Nanda Devi
Sangthang	Kumaon	Pithoragarh	30°21′15″N 80°47′12″E	6,480	21,260	Kalapani
Nilgiri Parbat	Garhwal	Chamoli	30°46′59″N 79°38′43″E	6,474	21,240	Kamet
Balakun	Garhwal	Chamoli	30°45′36″N 79°20′24″E	6,471	21,230	Gangotri
Durpata	Garhwal	Chamoli	30°43′03″N 79°44′12″E	6,468	21,220	Kamet
Jogin I	Garhwal	Uttarkashi–Tehri Garhwal	30°52′42″N 78°55′31″E	6,465	21,211	Gangotri
Bhagirathi Parbat III	Garhwal	Uttarkashi	30°52′09″N 79°08′01″E	6,454	21,175	Gangotri
Meru North	Garhwal	Uttarkashi	30°52′25″N 79°01′48″E	6,450	21,161	Gangotri
Avalanche Peak II	Garhwal	Uttarkashi–Chamoli	30°54′36″N 79°16′48″E	6,443	21,138	Gangotri
Panchchuli V	Kumaon	Pithoragarh	30°10′48″N 80°28′12″E	6,437	21,119	Panchchuli
Trimukhi Parbat	Garhwal	Uttarkashi	31°02′06″N 79°11′42″E	6,422	21,070	Gangotri
Balbala	Garhwal	Chamoli	31°01′25″N 79°26′02″E	6,416	21,050	Kamet
Nagalaphu	Kumaon	Pithoragarh	30°14′24″N 80°25′48″E	6,410	21,030	Panchchuli
Chaturangi	Garhwal	Uttarkashi	30°55′51″N 79°12′25″E	6,407	21,020	Gangotri
Lhatu Dhura	Kumaon–Garhwal	Chamoli–Pithoragarh	30°23′29″N 80°01′49″E	6,392	20,971	Nanda Devi
Kalanag (Black Peak)	Garhwal	Uttarkashi	31°01′12″N 78°34′12″E	6,387	20,955	Bandarpunch
Kalidhang	Garhwal	Uttarkashi	31°02′40″N 79°01′20″E	6,373	20,909	Gangotri
Suj Tilla	Kumaon	Pithoragarh	30°19′48″N 80°22′48″E	6,373	20,909	Panchchuli
Meru West	Garhwal	Uttarkashi	30°52′18″N 79°01′17″E	6,361	20,869	Gangotri
Panchchuli I	Kumaon	Pithoragarh	30°13′12″N 80°25′12″E	6,354	20,846	Panchchuli
Arwa Tower	Garhwal	Chamoli	30°52′12″N 79°16′48″E	6,352	20,840	Gangotri
Bethartoli	Garhwal	Chamoli	30°22′39″N 79°47′14″E	6,352	20,840	Nanda Devi
Sumeru Parbat	Garhwal	Uttarkashi–Rudraprayag	30°46′15″N 79°07′24″E	6,350	20,833	Gangotri
Jogin II	Garhwal	Uttarkashi	30°53′45″N 78°55′58″E	6,342	20,807	Gangotri
Shwetvarna	Garhwal	Uttarkashi	30°59′12″N 79°05′54″E	6,340	20,801	Gangotri
Bamba Dhura	Kumaon	Pithoragarh	30°26′24″N 80°16′48″E	6,334	20,781	Panchchuli
Burphu Dhura	Kumaon	Pithoragarh	30°26′24″N 80°16′48″E	6,334	20,781	Panchchuli
Panchchuli IV	Kumaon	Pithoragarh	30°11′24″N 80°27′00″E	6,334	20,781	Panchchuli
Suj Tilla West	Garhwal	Pithoragarh	30°19′48″N 80°22′48″E	6,333	20,778	Panchchuli
Lampak I	Garhwal	Chamoli	30°37′50″N 79°57′06″E	6,325	20,751	Nanda Devi
Changuch	Kumaon	Pithoragarh–Bageshwar	30°17′34″N 80°02′22″E	6,322	20,741	Nanda Devi
Brahma Parbat	Kumaon	Pithoragarh	30°16′30″N 80°38′57″E	6,321	20,738	Adi Kailash
Bethartoli South	Garhwal	Chamoli	30°22′03″N 79°47′36″E	6,318	20,728	Nanda Devi
Bandarpunch I	Garhwal	Uttarkashi	31°06′24″N 78°33′00″E	6,316	20,722	Bandarpunch
Nanda Gond	Kumaon	Pithoragarh	30°33′00″N 80°07′48″E	6,315	20,719	Nanda Devi
Panchchuli III	Kumaon	Pithoragarh	30°12′00″N 80°26′24″E	6,312	20,709	Panchchuli
Meru Central	Garhwal	Uttarkashi	30°52′18″N 79°01′56″E	6,310	20,702	Gangotri
Nanda Ghunti	Garhwal	Chamoli	30°20′54″N 79°43′06″E	6,309	20,699	Nanda Devi
Nanda Pal	Kumaon	Pithoragarh	30°31′12″N 80°08′24″E	6,306	20,689	Nanda Devi
Bamchu	Kumaon–Garhwal	Chamoli–Pithoragarh	30°26′56″N 80°01′18″E	6,303	20,679	Nanda Devi
Suli Top	Kumaon	Pithoragarh	30°25′09″N 80°19′29″E	6,300	20,669	Panchchuli
Kuchela Dhura	Kumaon	Pithoragarh	30°18′19″N 80°05′15″E	6,294	20,650	Nanda Devi
Balbala West	Garhwal	Chamoli	31°01′16″N 79°24′49″E	6,282	20,610	Kamet
Kirti Stambh	Garhwal	Uttarkashi–Tehri Garhwal	30°49′14″N 79°01′08″E	6,270	20,571	Gangotri
Sakram	Kumaon–Garhwal	Chamoli–Pithoragarh	30°25′58″N 80°02′03″E	6,254	20,518	Nanda Devi
Swargarohini I	Garhwal	Uttarkashi	31°06′00″N 78°30′58″E	6,252	20,512	Bandarpunch
Arwa Crest	Garhwal	Chamoli	30°52′12″N 79°15′36″E	6,250	20,505	Gangotri
Swargarohini II	Garhwal	Uttarkashi	31°06′03″N 78°30′16″E	6,247	20,495	Bandarpunch
Lohar Deo	Kumaon–Garhwal	Chamoli–Pithoragarh	30°26′35″N 80°07′22″E	6,245	20,489	Nanda Devi
Nanda Bhanar	Kumaon	Pithoragarh–Bageshwar	30°15′52″N 80°03′46″E	6,236	20,459	Nanda Devi
Nital Thaur	Kumaon	Pithoragarh	30°31′52″N 80°07′22″E	6,236	20,459	Panchchuli
Rishi Kot	Garhwal	Chamoli	30°27′25″N 79°53′33″E	6,236	20,459	Nanda Devi
Chipaydang (Peacock Peak)	Kumaon	Pithoragarh	30°15′34″N 80°40′11″E	6,220	20,407	Adi Kailash
Kalganga Dhura	Kumaon	Pithoragarh	30°27′15″N 80°15′33″E	6,215	20,390	Panchchuli
Swargarohini III	Garhwal	Uttarkashi	31°06′15″N 78°30′00″E	6,209	20,371	Bandarpunch
Uja Tirche	Kumaon–Garhwal	Chamoli–Pithoragarh	30°39′00″N 80°00′36″E	6,204	20,354	Nanda Devi
Avalanche Peak I	Garhwal	Chamoli	30°50′39″N 79°24′30″E	6,196	20,328	Gangotri
P. 6196	Kumaon	Pithoragarh	30°13′25″N 80°43′01″E	6,196	20,328	Adi Kailash
Arwa Spire	Garhwal	Chamoli	30°48′36″N 79°21′36″E	6,193	20,318	Gangotri
Mandani Parbat	Garhwal	Uttarkashi–Rudraprayag	30°44′01″N 79°11′57″E	6,193	20,318	Gangotri
Bhagirathi Parbat IV	Garhwal	Uttarkashi–Rudraprayag	30°52′35″N 79°07′59″E	6,193	20,318	Gangotri
P. 6191	Kumaon	Pithoragarh	30°23′18″N 80°33′14″E	6,191	20,312	Adi Kailash
Lampak II	Garhwal	Chamoli	30°38′31″N 79°55′54″E	6,181	20,279	Nanda Devi
P. 6178	Kumaon	Pithoragarh	30°08′00″N 80°43′12″E	6,178	20,269	Adi Kailash
Rajajyu	Kumaon	Pithoragarh	30°14′06″N 80°43′14″E	6,178	20,269	Adi Kailash
P. 6172	Kumaon	Pithoragarh	30°10′39″N 80°56′24″E	6,172	20,249	Kalapani
Rataban	Garhwal	Chamoli	30°45′02″N 79°42′19″E	6,166	20,230	Kamet
Geldhung	Garhwal	Chamoli	30°54′00″N 79°47′50″E	6,163	20,220	Kamet
Saife	Garhwal	Uttarkashi	30°57′52″N 79°05′59″E	6,161	20,213	Gangotri
Chalab	Kumaon–Garhwal	Chamoli–Pithoragarh	30°35′51″N 80°02′30″E	6,160	20,210	Nanda Devi
Darcho	Kumaon	Pithoragarh	30°34′43″N 80°12′28″E	6,145	20,161	Panchchuli
Shyamvarna	Garhwal	Uttarkashi	30°58′34″N 79°07′40″E	6,135	20,128	Gangotri
Srikantha	Garhwal	Uttarkashi	30°57′24″N 78°48′10″E	6,133	20,121	Gangotri
Lassar	Kumaon	Pithoragarh	30°33′32″N 80°15′21″E	6,129	20,108	Panchchuli
Lalla We	Kumaon	Pithoragarh	30°29′06″N 80°18′20″E	6,123	20,089	Panchchuli
Ishan Parbat	Kumaon	Pithoragarh	30°18′50″N 80°37′24″E	6,120	20,079	Adi Kailash
P. 6120	Kumaon	Pithoragarh	30°13′25″N 80°43′01″E	6,120	20,079	Panchchuli
Jogin III	Garhwal	Uttarkashi–Tehri Garhwal	30°52′21″N 78°56′05″E	6,116	20,066	Gangotri
Kholi	Kumaon	Pithoragarh	30°35′36″N 80°04′38″E	6,114	20,059	Nanda Devi
Sarup Choti	Garhwal	Uttarkashi	31°09′02″N 78°18′42″E	6,108	20,039	Gangotri
Kalabaland Dhura	Kumaon	Pithoragarh	30°25′31″N 80°15′34″E	6,105	20,030	Panchchuli
Bandarpunch II (White Peak)	Garhwal	Uttarkashi	31°06′24″N 78°33′00″E	6,102	20,020	Bandarpunch
Kalindi	Garhwal	Uttarkashi–Chamoli	30°55′20″N 79°16′48″E	6,102	20,020	Gangotri
Tel Kot	Kumaon	Pithoragarh	30°10′32″N 80°28′06″E	6,102	20,020	Panchchuli
Tharkot	Kumaon–Garhwal	Chamoli–Bageshwar	30°13′30″N 79°49′24″E	6,099	20,010	Nanda Devi
Topi Dhura	Kumaon	Pithoragarh	30°33′25″N 80°12′23″E	6,099	20,010	Panchchuli
Koteshwar I	Garhwal	Uttarkashi	30°57′48″N 79°06′20″E	6,080	19,948	Gangotri
Bainti	Kumaon	Pithoragarh	30°09′37″N 80°27′33″E	6,072	19,921	Panchchuli
Tara Parbat	Garhwal	Uttarkashi–Chamoli	31°02′47″N 79°22′09″E	6,069	19,911	Gangotri
Ronti	Garhwal	Chamoli	30°22′09″N 79°43′10″E	6,063	19,892	Nanda Devi
Ikualari	Kumaon	Pithoragarh	30°34′15″N 80°05′23″E	6,059	19,879	Nanda Devi
Dangthal	Kumaon	Pithoragarh–Bageshwar	30°13′33″N 80°05′50″E	6,050	19,849	Nanda Devi
Barmatia	Garhwal	Chamoli	30°45′15″N 79°58′06″E	6,041	19,820	Kamet
Bhrigu Parbat	Garhwal	Uttarkashi	30°57′34″N 78°59′06″E	6,041	19,820	Gangotri
Nagling	Kumaon	Pithoragarh	30°08′42″N 80°28′36″E	6,041	19,820	Panchchuli
Chikula We	Kumaon	Pithoragarh	30°31′04″N 80°23′10″E	6,038	19,810	Panchchuli
Nandakhani	Kumaon	Pithoragarh–Bageshwar	30°15′42″N 80°04′22″E	6,029	19,780	Nanda Devi
Trisul III	Garhwal	Chamoli	30°15′00″N 79°46′12″E	6,008	19,711	Nanda Devi
Thelu	Garhwal	Uttarkashi	30°58′06″N 79°04′51″E	6,002	19,692	Gangotri
Om Parvat	Kumaon–Garhwal	Chamoli–Pithoragarh	30°34′48″N 80°01′12″E	5,590	18,340	Adi Kailash

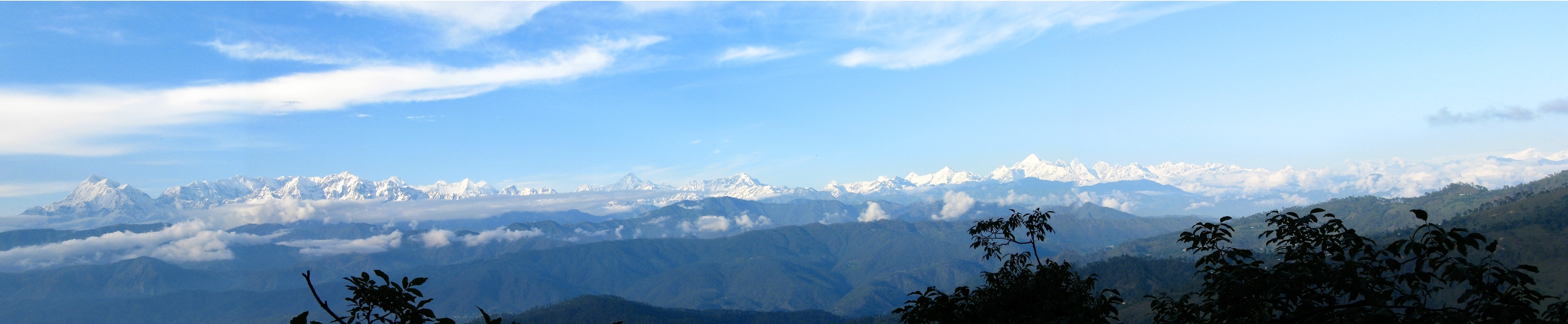
Panoramic view of the Kumaon Himalaya from Kausani

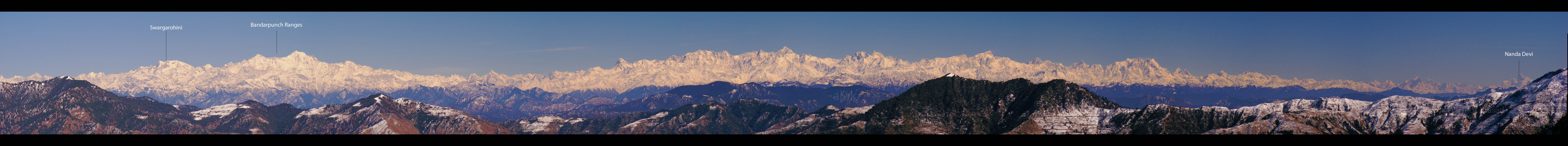
A panorama of Garhwal Himalaya from Dhanaulti

== See also ==
- Askot Musk Deer Sanctuary
- Gangotri National Park
- Govind Pashu Vihar National Park and Sanctuary
- Kedarnath Wildlife Sanctuary
- Nanda Devi National Park
- Valley of Flowers National Park
