= Mana Parbat III =

Mountain in Uttarakhand, India

- Mana Parbat West
- Location within Uttarakhand

Highest point
- Elevation: 6,730 m (22,080 ft)
- Prominence: 194 m (636 ft)
- Coordinates: 30°57′12″N 79°13′04″E

Geography
- Location: Uttarakhand, India
- Parent range: Garhwal Himalaya

Mana Parbat III (Hindi: माना पर्वत III) is a mountain of the Garhwal Himalaya in Uttarakhand, India. Mana Parbat III standing majestically at 6,730 metres (22,080 ft). It is 43rd highest located entirely within the Uttrakhand. Nanda Devi, is the highest mountain in this category. It is located 2.1 km ESE of Mana Parbat I 6,771 metres (22,215 ft) and 1.4 km north west lies Pilapani Parbat 6,796 metres (22,297 ft). On the south side lies the Chandra Parbat I 6,739 metres (22,110 ft) and Bhgirathi Massif on the south west side.

== Glaciers and rivers ==
It is surrounded by glaciers on all the sides: Kalindi Glacier on the southern side, Arwa Glacier on the eastern side, Mana Glacier on the northern side and Raktavarn Glacier on the western side. Kalindi Glacier joins with Chaturangi Glacier and Chaturangi Glacier joins with Gangotri Glacier from there emerges the river Bhagirathi the main tributaries of river Ganga. Mana glacier on the other side drains into Jadh Ganga also called Jahanvi Ganga that joins Bhagirathi near Bhaironghati. Arwa nala starts from Arwa glacier that drains into Saraswati river near Ghastoli that ultimately joins Alaknanda river at Mana village.

== Neighboring peaks ==
Neighboring peaks of Mana Parbat III:

- Mana Parbat I: 6,794 m (22,290 ft)30°56′59″N 79°14′30″E
- Mana Parbat II: 6,771 m (22,215 ft)30°57′05″N 79°15′15″E
- Kalindi peak: 6,102 m (20,020 ft)30°55′20″N 79°16′48″E
- Pilapani Parbat: 6,796 m (22,297 ft)30°57′57″N 79°12′45″E
- Chandra Parbat I: 6,739 m (22,110 ft)30°52′19″N 79°15′25″E

== See also ==
- List of Himalayan peaks of Uttarakhand
