= Kalindi (mountain) =

Mountain in Uttarakhand, India

- Kalindi Peak
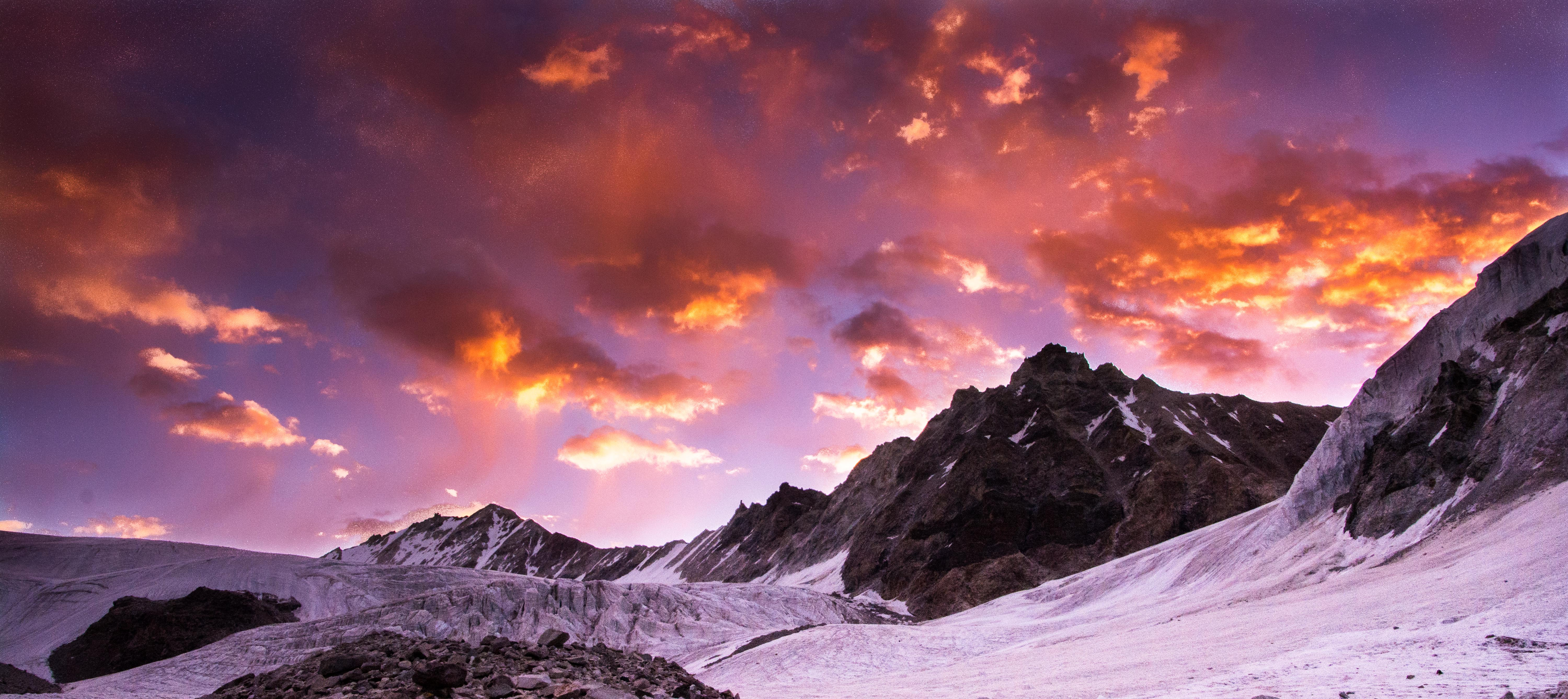

Highest point
- Elevation: 6,102 m (20,020 ft)
- Prominence: 133 m (436 ft)
- Coordinates: 30°55′20″N 79°16′48″E

Geography
- Location within Uttarakhand
- Location: Uttarakhand, India
- Parent range: Garhwal Himalaya

Climbing
- First ascent: On 20 the July 1931 by Frank Smythe and Eric Shipton

Kalindi is a mountain of the Garhwal Himalaya in Uttarakhand India. The elevation of Kalindi is 6,102 metres (20,020 ft). It lies 1.1 km North of Avalanche Peak (India) 6,196 metres (20,328 ft) its nearest higher neighbor. Mana Parbat II 6,771 metres (22,215 ft) lies 4.2 km NNW and it is 6.1 km NNE of Chandra Parbat I 6,739 metres (22,110 ft).

== Climbing history ==
It was first climbed by Frank Smythe and Eric Shipton on 20 July 1931. While trying to establish a crossing of the Great Himalayan watershed into Tehri-Garhwal in the entirely unknown area at the head of the Arwa valley from Mana Badrinath side.

In 1947 on August 1, A Swiss team under the leadership of André Roch climbed Kalindi Peak by the N.E. arête. Other members of the party were Mme. Annalies Lohner, René Dittert, Alfred Sutter, Alexander Graven and Tenzing Norgay.

The third ascent on July 15, 1971, by Bibhas Das, Bijendra Singh Negi, Instructors Ujagar Singh and Ratan Singh. They start at 5:45 and reached the summit of Kalindi at nine A.M. The last 500 feet were rocky.

== Neighboring and subsidiary peaks ==
Neighboring or subsidiary peaks of Kalindi:

- Chandra Parbat I 6,739 metres (22,110 ft)30°52′19″N 79°15′25″E
- Mana Parbat II 6,771 m (22,215 ft)30°57′05″N 79°15′15″E
- Avalanche Peak (India) 6,196 metres (20,328 ft)30°50′39″N 79°24′30″E

== Glaciers and rivers ==
Kalindi falls at the watershed of Arwa Valley and Gangotri it has Chaturangi Glacier on the Western side and Arwa Glacier on the Eastern side. Chaturangi Glacier which drains itself at Gangotri Glacier from there emerges Bhagirathi river. one of the main tributaries of the river Ganga. On the other side, Arwa Glacier drain itself at Saraswati River that later joins Alaknanda River the other main tributaries of river Ganga that later joins Bhagirathi river at Devprayag and became Ganga thereafter.

== See also ==
- List of Himalayan peaks of Uttarakhand
