= Shwetvarna =

Mountain in Uttarakhand, India

- Swetvarn
- Location within Uttarakhand

Highest point
- Elevation: 6,340 m (20,800 ft)
- Prominence: 240 m (790 ft)
- Coordinates: 30°59′12″N 79°05′54″E

Geography
- Location: Uttarakhand, India
- Parent range: Garhwal Himalaya

Shwetvarna is a mountain of the Garhwal Himalaya in Uttarakhand India.The elevation of Shwetvarna is 6,340 metres (20,801 ft) and its prominence is 240 metres (787 ft). It is 111th joint highest located entirely within the Uttrakhand. Nanda Devi, is the highest mountain in this category. It lies 1.2 km SSE of Chaturbhuj 6,654 metres (21,831 ft) its nearest higher neighbor and it is 1.2 km SSW of Sudarshan Parbat 6,507 metres (21,348 ft). It lies 3 km NW of Shyamvarn 6,135 metres (20,128 ft).

== Climbing history ==
An Indo-French Expedition of eleven member team seven Indian and four French attempted many peaks around Swetvarn glacier. Some of the members attempted Swetvarn on 25 May 1981 and reached within 300 ft of the summit through the east ridge. C. D. Danthi, Jacques Giraud, Kanu Pomal and Lakhpa Tsering had to return because of mixed terrain ahead.

== Neighboring and subsidiary peaks ==
neighboring or subsidiary peaks of Swetvarn:

- Chirbas Parbat 6,529 metres (21,421 ft)31°02′03″N 79°03′09″E
- Matri 6,721 metres (22,051 ft)31°00′53″N 79°04′11″E
- Sudarshan Parbat 6,507 metres (21,348 ft)30°58′37″N 79°05′36″E
- Kalidhang 6,373 metres (20,909 ft)31°02′40″N 79°01′20″E
- Yogeshwar: 6,678 m (21,909 ft)30°59′56″N 79°07′03″E

== Glaciers and rivers ==
On the east side lies Swetvarn Glacier which joins Raktvarn Glacier and Raktvarn drain itself near Gomukh beside Gangotri Glacier and part of Bhagirathi river. Bhagirathi River comes out From the snout of Gangotri Glacier. Bhagirathi joins the Alaknanda River the other main tributaries of river Ganga at Dev Prayag and called Ganga there after.

== See also ==
- List of Himalayan peaks of Uttarakhand
