= List of things named after Atal Bihari Vajpayee =

Atal Bihari Vajpayee was an Indian statesman and poet who served as the tenth Prime Minister of India, first in 1996 and again from 1998 to 2004. Places and institutions named after him include:

== Localities ==
- Atal Nagar
- Atal Park

== Stadiums ==
- Atal Bihari Vajpayee Stadium
- Bharat Ratna Shri Atal Bihari Vajpayee Ekana Cricket Stadium

== Bridges ==
- Atal Setu, Goa
- Atal Setu, Jammu and Kashmir
- Atal Setu, Maharashtra

== Educational Institutions ==
- Atal Bihari Vajpayee Government Institute of Engineering and Technology
- Atal Bihari Vajpayee Government Medical College
- Atal Bihari Vajpayee Hindi Vishwavidyalaya
- Atal Bihari Vajpayee Indian Institute of Information Technology and Management
- Atal Bihari Vajpayee Institute of Medical Sciences
- Atal Bihari Vajpayee Institute of Mountaineering and Allied Sports
- Atal Bihari Vajpayee Medical University
- Atal Bihari Vajpayee Vishwavidyalaya
- Atal Medical and Research University

== Parks ==
- Atal Bihari Vajpayee Regional Park

== Organisms ==
- Dendrobium Atal Bihari Vajpayee (an orchid hybrid in Sikkim)

== Others ==
- Atal Bhujal Yojana
- Atal Bihari Vajpayee TTMC
- Atal I
- Atal II
- Atal Innovation Mission
- Atal Indore City Transport Service Limited
- Atal Mission for Rejuvenation and Urban Transformation
- Atal Pedestrian Bridge
- Atal Pension Yojana
- Atal Tunnel, Himachal Pradesh
- Vajpayee Arogyasri Yojana

== See also ==
- List of things named after prime ministers of India
