= Satopanth South West =

Mountain in Uttarakhand, India

- P. 6770
- Location within Uttarakhand

Highest point
- Elevation: 6,770 m (22,210 ft)
- Prominence: 195 m (640 ft)
- Coordinates: 30°50′12″N 79°11′53″E

Geography
- Location: Uttarakhand, India
- Parent range: Garhwal Himalaya

Satopanth South West also called P. 6770 is a mountain of the Garhwal Himalaya in Uttarakhand, India. The elevation of Satopanth south west is 6,770 metres (22,211 ft) and its prominence is 195 metres (640 ft). It is 40th highest located entirely within the Uttrakhand. Nanda Devi, is the highest mountain in this category. It lies in the same connecting ridge that joins Satopanth and Bhagirathi Parbat I. It lies 1.8 km SW of Satopanth. Its nearest higher neighbor Satopanth 7,075 metres (23,212 ft). It is located 3.4 km SE of Vasuki South 6,702 metres (21,988 ft) and 5.2 km NNW lies Bhagirathi I 6,856 metres (22,493 ft).

== Gangotri National Park ==
The entire surrounding area are protected within the 2,390 km^{2} (920 sq mi) Gangotri National Park, one of the largest conservation area in India. The Gangotri National Park is home to several world-class treks, including Gangotri Gomukh Tapoban Nandanvan, Kedarnath Vasuki tal trek, Har ki dun valley trek, Badrinath to Satopanth tal trek, Gangotri to Kedar tal trek, Gangotri to Badrinath trek via Kalindi khal and many more.

== Neighboring and subsidiary peaks ==
neighboring or subsidiary peaks of Satopanth south west:

- Satopanth, 7,075m (23,212 ft), 30°50′42″N 79°12′45″E
- Vasuki Parbat, 6,792m (22,283 ft), 30°52′30″N 79°10′30″E
- Bhagirathi Parbat III, 6,454m (21175 ft)30°52′09″N 79°08′01″E
- Swachhand, 6,721m (22051 ft)30°48′34″N 79°13′27″E
- Chaukhamba I, 7,138m (23419 ft)30°52′55″N 79°08′01″E
- Mandani Parbat, 6,193m (21175 ft)30°44′01″N 79°11′57″E

== Glaciers and rivers ==
On the southern side lies Swachhand Bamak and on the northern side lies Sundar Bamak. Sundar bamak merge with Chaturangi Bamak that later joins Gangotri Glacier Swachhand bamak also merge with Gangotri Glacier. From the snout of Gangotri Glacier comes out Bhagirathi River one of the main tributaries of river Ganga. Bhagirathi joins the Alaknanda River the other main tributaries of river Ganga at Dev Prayag and called Ganga there after.

== See also ==
- List of Himalayan peaks of Uttarakhand
