= Avalanche Peak (India) =

Mountain peak in Uttarakhand, India

Avalanche Peak I
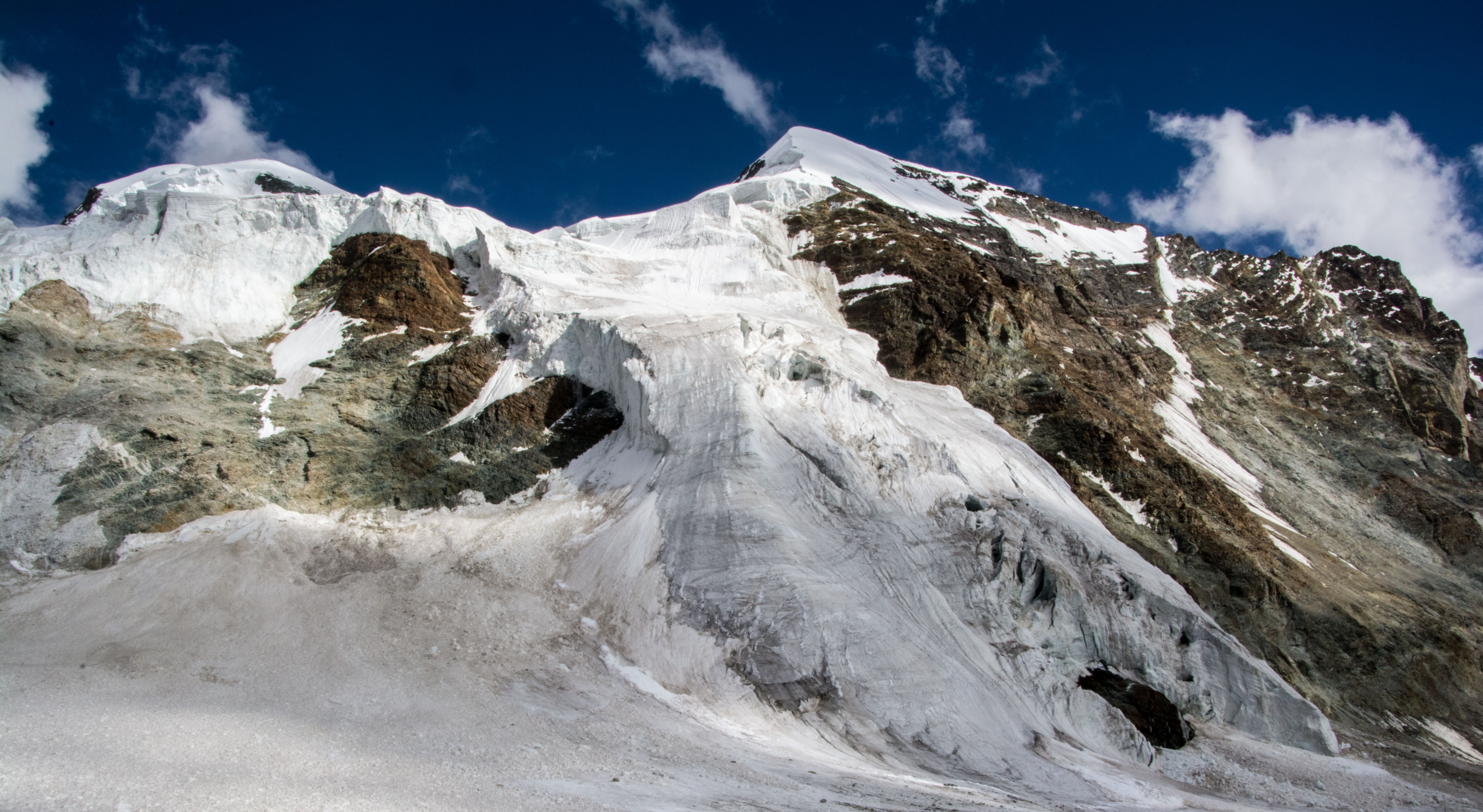
- Avalanche Peak

Highest point
- Elevation: 6,196 m (20,328 ft)
- Coordinates: 30°50′24″N 79°24′00″E

Geography
- Location within India
- Location: Chamoli, Uttarakhand, India
- Parent range: Garhwal Himalaya

Climbing
- First ascent: 1931 Eric Shipton and Frank Smythe
- Easiest route: rock/snow/ice through South Ridge.

The Avalanche Peaks are two mountain peaks situated above the Arwa Valley to the northwest of Badrinath in the Indian state of Uttarakhand. The peaks are named for the avalanches experienced by early climbers seeking to cross the glaciers beneath them.

== Avalanche Peak I ==
Avalanche Peak I is situated on north–south massif between Kalindi Bamak and the Arwa Bank. This is the main peak among the two and situated south to the Avalanche Peak II. The altitude of the summit is 6196 metres.

The peak was first climbed in 1931 by Eric Shipton and Frank Smythe with two Sherpas.

== Avalanche Peak II ==
Avalanche Peak II

Highest point
- Elevation: 6,443 m (21,138 ft)

Geography
- Location: Chamoli, Uttarakhand, India
- Parent range: Garhwal Himalaya

Climbing
- First ascent: 1952
- Easiest route: rock/snow/ice through Bangnea Glacier system

Avalanche Peak II is the higher and more northerly peak. It is situated south of the Kalindi Khal which separates the Chaturangi glacier from the Arwa valley. The altitude of the summit is 6443 metres.

== Neighbouring peaks ==
- Chandra Parbat
- Chaturangi
- Kalindi

== See also ==
- List of Himalayan peaks of Uttarakhand
- Arwa Group
