= Durpata =

Mountain in Uttarakhand, India

- Location within Uttarakhand

Highest point
- Elevation: 6,468 m (21,220 ft)
- Prominence: 638 m (2,093 ft)
- Coordinates: 30°43′03″N 79°44′12″E

Geography
- Location: Uttarakhand, India
- Parent range: Garhwal Himalaya

Climbing
- First ascent: On 16 August 1939 Andre Roch and sherpa Gombu during a Swiss Climbing Party.

Durpata is a mountain of the Garhwal Himalaya in Uttarakhand India. It is situated in the Kamet range. The elevation of Durpata is 6,468 metres (21,220 ft) and its prominence is 638 metres (2,093 ft). It is 93rd highest located entirely within the Uttrakhand. Nanda Devi, is the highest mountain in this category. It lies 3.8 km east of Gauri Parbat 6,708 metres (22,008 ft) its nearest higher neighbor. Hathi Parbat 6,727 metres (22,070 ft) lies 4.8 km SW and it is 5.1 km SSE of Rataban 6,166 metres (20,230 ft). It lies 11.7 km SSE of Nilgiri Parbat 6,474 metres (21,240 ft).

== Climbing history ==
It was first climbed by Andre Roch and Sherpa Gombu in 1939 during a Swiss climbing party. On 16 August they climbed a glacier and followed a ridge on the south-east slope between two summits. they found a large partially frozen tarn at 21,000 feet Mounting some couloirs they soon attained a snowy ridge to the top. They descended after building a small cairn and back in camp in 2 hours.

== Neighboring and subsidiary peaks ==
Neighboring or subsidiary peaks of Durpata:

- Gauri Parbat 6,708 metres (22,008 ft)30°42′40″N 79°42′03″E
- Rataban 6,166 metres (20,230 ft)30°45′02″N 79°42′19″E
- Nilgiri Parbat 6,474 metres (21,240 ft)30°46′59″N 79°38′43″E
- Hathi Parbat 6,727 metres (22,070 ft)30°41′06″N 79°42′21″E

== Glaciers and rivers ==
It was surrounded by Ratabon Glacier on the northern side and Kosa Glacier on the southern side. Both the glacier merge them self and drains down to Dhauliganga River near Malari. Later Dhauli ganga met with Alaknanda at Vishnuprayag. Alaknanda River is one of the main tributaries of river Ganga that later joins Bhagirathi River the other main tributaries of river Ganga at Devprayag and became Ganga there after.

== See also ==
- List of Himalayan peaks of Uttarakhand
