= Ishan Parbat =

Mountain in Uttarakhand, India

- Adi Kailash II
- Location within Uttarakhand

Highest point
- Elevation: 6,120 m (20,080 ft)
- Prominence: 456 m (1,496 ft)
- Coordinates: 30°18′50″N 80°37′24″E

Geography
- Location: Uttarakhand, India
- Parent range: Kumaon Himalaya

Climbing
- First ascent: On 29 September 2006 A British American team led by Martin Moran.

Ishan Parbat is a mountain of the Kumaon Himalaya in Uttarakhand India also called Adi Kailash II. The elevation of Ishan Parbat is 6,120 metres (20,079 ft) and its prominence is 456 metres (1,496 ft). It is joint 154th highest located entirely within the Uttrakhand. Nanda Devi, is the highest mountain in this category. It lies 1.1km SW of Adi Kailash 5,945 metres (19,505 ft) and 4.9km NNW of Brammah Parvat 6,321 metres (20,738 ft) its nearest higher neighbor. It lies 12.7km NW of Rajay Jue 6,242 metres (20,479 ft). It is located 16.3km WSW of Sangthang 6,433 metres (21,106 ft) and 22km west lies Panchchuli II 6,907 metres (22,661 ft).

== Climbing history ==
A British American team led by Martin Moran venture in Adi Kailash Range in 2006. They camped at Nikurch Rama for an ascent on Ishan Parvat. They knew this approach route to Adi Kailash from there previous visit in 2004. On 28 September they made a load-ferry to a summit camp at 5400m in the snow bowl. On 29 they started at 1 A.M. Martin Welch had fixed a rope to reach the col at 5825 m. Finally a simple snow ridge to a final rock outcrop. At 9 a.m. they reached the summit. Seveven member including local porter Mangal singh reached the summit.

== Neighboring and subsidiary peaks ==
neighboring or subsidiary peaks of Ishan Parvat:

- Panchchuli II: 6,907 m (22,661 ft)30°12′49″N 80°25′33″E
- Sangthang: 6,433 metres (21,106 ft)30°21′00″N 80°47′24″E
- Brammah Parvat: 6,321 metres (20,738 ft)30°16′30″N 80°38′57″E
- Rajay Jue: 6,242 metres (20,479 ft)30°14′10″N 80°43′15″E

== Glaciers and rivers ==
Nama glacier this 5 km long glacier flows NE towards Kuthi. The glacier has three feeder streams.

Rama glacier The biggest glacier of this range flows NW from Brammah Parvat and Cheepaydang to the main Darma valley.

Lebong glacier This short glacier lies on the W side of the Shin la and terminates at 4400 m above Bidang grazings.

Nikurch Rama glacier This glacier feeds the Kuthi Yankti and is surrounded by Adi Kailash, Ishan Parvat, Brammah Parvat NE Top and Nikurch Quilla. The glacier splits into two branches.

Chatem glacier Named after a small shrine of worship for local shepherds above its Northern bank, the Chatem glacier drains the SE wall of Brammah Parvat.

Ganna glacier

== See also ==
- List of Himalayan peaks of Uttarakhand
