= Shyamvarna =

Mountain in Uttarakhand, India

Shyamvarn
- Location within Uttarakhand

Highest point
- Elevation: 6,135 m (20,128 ft)
- Prominence: 250 m (820 ft)
- Coordinates: 30°58′34″N 79°07′40″E

Geography
- Location: Uttarakhand, India
- Parent range: Garhwal Himalaya

Climbing
- First ascent: on 26 September 1985 a team from west bengal, India.

Shyamvarn is a mountain of the Garhwal Himalaya in Uttarakhand India. The peak lies above the Shyamvarn Glacier. The elevation of Shyamvarn is 6,135 metres (20,128 ft) and its prominence is 250 metres (820 ft). It is 150th highest located entirely within the Uttrakhand. Nanda Devi, is the highest mountain in this category. It lies 3.3 km east of Sudarshan Parbat 6,507 metres (21,348 ft). Saife 6,161 metres (20,213 ft) lies 2.5 km WSW and it is 3 km ESE of Shwetvarna 6,340 metres (20,801 ft). It lies 2.8 km South of Yogeshwar 6,678 metres (21,909 ft).

== Climbing history ==
The first ascent of Shyamvarn ends with a tragedy. An Indian eight member team led by climber Asit Kumar Moitra Climbed Shyamvarn on 26 September 1985. On the way back from the summit, the leader Asit Kumar Moitra slipped and fell 2000 feet to his death. The team consisted of Samir Bhattacharya, Manas Bardhan, Nabagopal Basak, Ramjan Bose, Krishna Ganguli, Asish Roy and Sanjoy Roy.

An Indian team from Bombay was led by Ramakant Mahadik. On 20 June 1989 seven member climbed Shyamvarn this is the second ascent of this peak.

== Neighboring and subsidiary peaks ==
Neighboring or subsidiary peaks of Shyamvarn:

- Sudarshan Parbat 6,507 metres (21,348 ft)30°58′37″N 79°05′36″E
- Yogeshwar 6,678 m (21,909 ft)30°59′56″N 79°07′03″E
- Chaturbhuj 6,654 metres (21,831 ft)30°59′41″N 79°05′37″E
- Matri 6,721 metres (22,051 ft)31°00′53″N 79°04′11″E
- Swetvarn 6,340 metres (20,801 ft)30°59′12″N 79°05′54″E
- Kalidhang 6,373 metres (20,909 ft)31°02′40″N 79°01′20″E

== Glaciers and rivers ==
Swetvarn Bamak on the western side. Shyamvarn bamak on the eastern side both these Glaciers are tributaries of Raktvarn Bamak which drain itself at Gangotri Glacier. From the snout of Gangotri Glacier which was called Gomukh emerges Bhagirathi river. one of the main tributaries of river Ganga that later joins Alaknanda River the other main tributaries of river Ganga at Devprayag and became Ganga there after. the word Bamak is used for Glacier in this part of the world.

== See also ==
- List of Himalayan peaks of Uttarakhand
