= Ikualari =

Mountain in Uttarakhand, India

- Location within Uttarakhand

Highest point
- Elevation: 6,059 m (19,879 ft)
- Prominence: 108 m (354 ft)
- Coordinates: 30°34′15″N 80°05′23″E

Geography
- Location: Uttarakhand, India
- Parent range: Kumaon Himalaya

Climbing
- First ascent: In 1968 by a team from Mumbai University

Ikualari is a mountain of the Kumaon Himalaya in Uttarakhand India. It is situated in the Nanda Devi range. The elevation of Ikualari is 6,059 metres (19,879 ft) and its prominence is 108 metres (354 ft). It is 165th highest located entirely within the Uttrakhand. Nanda Devi, is the highest mountain in this category. It lies 2.7 km NW of Nanda Gond 6,315 metres (20,719 ft). Nital Thaur 6,236 metres (20,459 ft) lies 4.8 km SSE and It lies 3.5 km SSE of Kholi 6,114 metres (20,059 ft). Hardeol 7,151 metres (23,461 ft) lies 8.9 km west of it.

== Climbing history ==
A group of Slovenian comprising Urban Golob, Boris Lorencic, Karel Zavrsnik and Matija Jost, reached Milam Glacier. Before attempting Hardeol they climbed Ikualari and Nital Thaur to acclimatize them self. They established two camps, first one at 4,600m on the upper glacier and second at 5,200m on the southwest ridge. On October 3 they reached the summit in three hours climbing from the second camp. They repeated the same route which was done by the only previous ascent of this peak which was made by a team from Mumbai University in 1968 led by Prof. Chandekar.

== Neighboring and subsidiary peaks ==
Neighboring or subsidiary peaks of Ikualari:

- Hardeol7,151 metres (23,461 ft)30°33′36″N 80°00′39″E
- Kholi6,114 metres (20,059 ft)30°35′36″N 80°04′38″E
- Nital Thaur 6,236 metres (20,459 ft)30°31′52″N 80°07′22″E
- Nanda Gond 6,315 metres (20,719 ft)30°33′00″N 80°07′48″E
- Darcho: 6,145 m (20,161 ft)30°34′43″N 80°12′28″E

== Glaciers and rivers ==
The nearby Glaciers are Ikualari Glacier, Billanlari Glacier, Surajkund Glacier all this glacier joins the main glacier Milam Glacier from there emerges the river Goriganga River that later joins the Kali River at Jauljibi.

== See also ==
- List of Himalayan peaks of Uttarakhand
