= Devi Mukut =

Mountain in Uttarakhand, India

- P.6648
- Location within Uttarakhand

Highest point
- Elevation: 6,648 m (21,811 ft)
- Listing: Mountains of Uttarakhand
- Coordinates: 30°18′37″N 79°52′21″E

Geography
- Location: Uttarakhand, India
- Parent range: Garhwal Himalayas

Climbing
- First ascent: September 22, 1979 by a Japanese expedition led by Kenji Hirasawa

Devi Mukut is a mountain of the Garhwal Himalayas in Uttarakhand, India. It stands near the western rim of the Nanda Devi Sanctuary between Devistan and Devtoli. The elevation of Devi Mukut is 6,648 metres (21,811 ft). It is 59th highest located entirely within the Uttrakhand. Nanda Devi, is the highest mountain in this category. It lies 3.3 km south of Devistan I 6,678 metres (21,909 ft) its nearest higher neighbor. Devtoli 6,788 metres (22,270 ft) stands at 3.3 km SSW. It stands 4.3 km north of Maiktoli 6,803 metres (22,320 ft) and Nanda Devi lies 11.9 km NE.

== Climbing history ==
A six member Japanese expedition led by Kenji Hirasawa made the first ascent of Devi Mukut on September 22, 1979. Three of their members reached the summit and approached the peak by the Trisul Nala.

In September 1978 a Polish team attempted the peak and reached a height of 6350 metre.

== Neighboring and subsidiary peaks ==
Neighboring or subsidiary peaks of Deo Damla:

- Nanda Devi: 7,816 m (25,643 ft)30°55′12″N 79°35′30″E
- Trisul: 7,120 m (23,360 ft)30°18′36″N 79°46′12″E
- Devistan II: 6,529 m (21,421 ft)30°20′58″N 79°52′50″E
- Devtoli: 6,788 m (22,270 ft)30°17′09″N 79°51′12″E
- Rishi Kot: 6,236 m (20,459 ft)30°27′25″N 79°53′33″E
- Changabang: 6,864 m (22,520 ft)30°30′00″N 79°55′37″E

== Glaciers and rivers ==
Dakshini Rishi Glacier on the eastern side and Trisul Glacier on the western side, both these glaciers drains into Rishi Ganga. Rishi Ganga meets with Dhauli ganga near Rini. Later Dhauli ganga met with Alaknanda river at Vishnu Prayag. Alaknanda River is one of the main tributaries of river Ganga that later joins Bhagirathi River the other main tributaries of river Ganga at Dev Prayag and became Ganga there after.
