= Chirbas Parbat =

Mountain in Uttarakhand, India

- Location within Uttarakhand

Highest point
- Elevation: 6,529 m (21,421 ft)
- Prominence: 643 m (2,110 ft)
- Listing: Mountains of India
- Coordinates: 31°02′03″N 79°03′09″E

Geography
- Location: Uttarakhand, India
- Parent range: Garhwal Himalaya

Climbing
- First ascent: 8 June 1986 by Goutam Dutta and Sher Singh of Kangchenjunga Foundation, Calcutta.

Chirbas Parbat (Hindi:चीड़वास पर्वत) is a 6,529-metre (21,421 ft) mountain of the Garhwal Himalaya in the Indian state of Uttarakhand. It is the joint 81st highest mountain located entirely within Uttrakhand. Chirbas Parbat lies between Kalidhang (6,373 metres (20,909 ft)), and Matri (6,721 metres (22,051 ft)). Its nearest higher neighbor Matri lies 3 km southeast. It is located 5.9 km northwest of Chaturbhuj (6,654 metres (21,831 ft)), while 13.8 km east lies Trimukhi Parbat (6,450 metres (21,161 ft)).

== Climbing history ==
The first ascent of Chirbas Parbat came on 8 June 1986, completed by Kangchenjunga Foundation, Calcutta. The team was led by Indranath Mukherjee who was a member of the 1985 team led by R Bhattacharya. Goutam Dutta and Sher Singh reached the summit of Chirbas Parbat on 8 June.

== Glaciers and rivers ==
Chirbas Bamak lies on the northern side. Gulli gad bamak is on the eastern side; from there emerges Gulligad Nall, which later joins Jadh Ganga near Neylong. That further joins Bhagirathi river near Bharion ghati, one of the main tributaries of the river Ganga. On the southwest side lies Deogad Bamak which drains between Chirbas and Gangotri.

== Neighboring peaks ==
Neighboring peaks of Chirbas Parbat:

- Chaturbhuj 6,654 metres (21,831 ft)30°59′41″N 79°05′37″E
- Matri 6,721 metres (22,051 ft)31°00′53″N 79°04′11″E
- Sudarshan Parbat 6,507 metres (21,348 ft)30°58′37″N 79°05′36″E
- Kalidhang 6,373 metres (20,909 ft)31°02′40″N 79°01′20″E
- Yogeshwar: 6,678 m (21,909 ft)30°59′56″N 79°07′03″E

== See also ==
- List of Himalayan peaks of Uttarakhand
