= Thelu =

Garhwal Himalaya peak

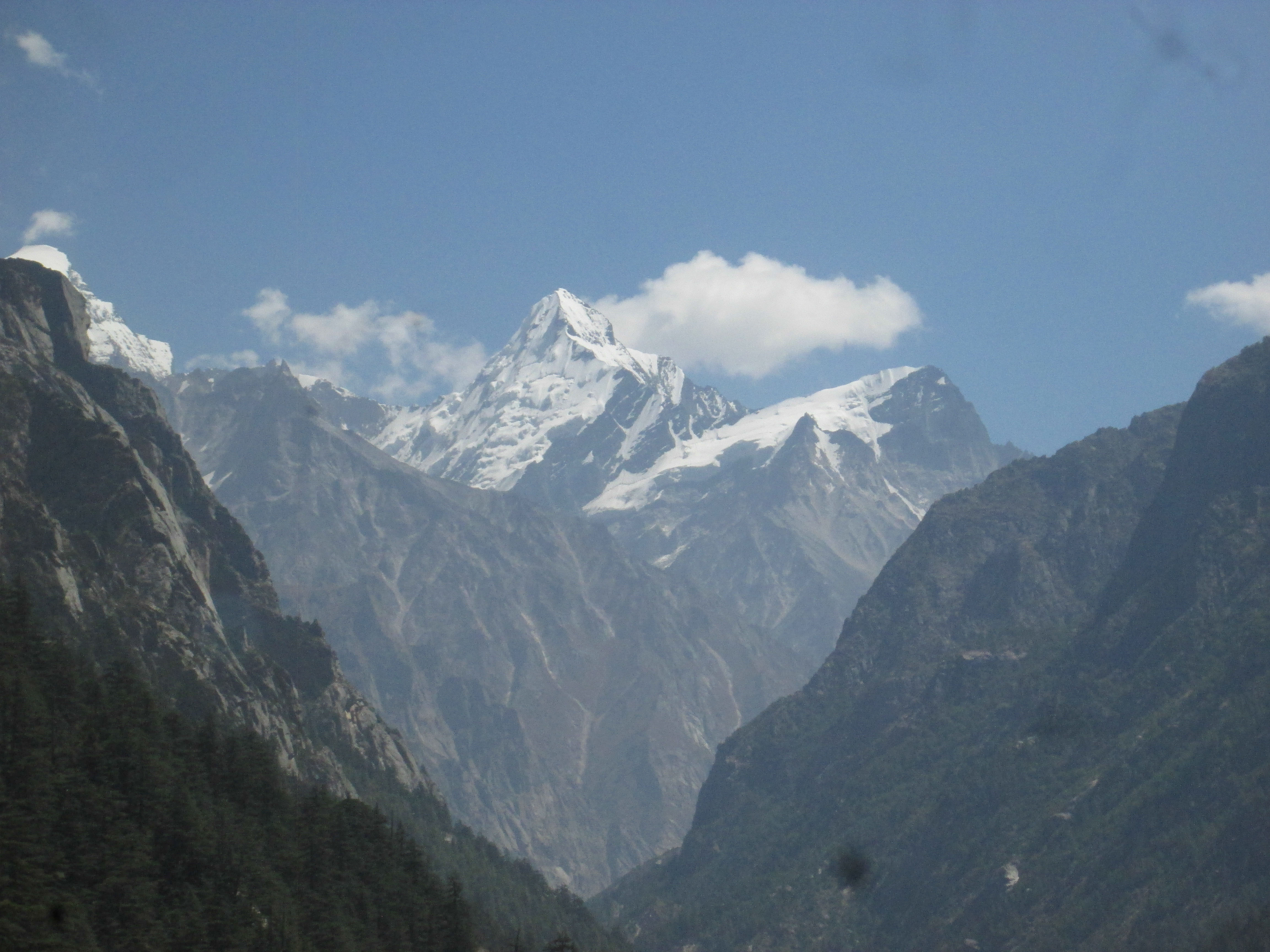
- Thelu is the peak on the right; in the centre stands Sudarshan Parbat

Highest point
- Elevation: 6,000 m (20,000 ft)
- Listing: List of mountain peaks of Uttarakhand
- Coordinates: 30°58′06″N 79°04′51″E

Geography
- Location within Uttarakhand Location within India
- Parent range: Garhwal Himalaya

Thelu or Mt. Thelu is a 6002-metre peak in the Gangotri range of the Garhwal Himalaya, Uttarakhand, India. Its immediate neighbour is the Sudarshan Parbat.
