= Sri Kailash =

Mountain in Uttarakhand, India

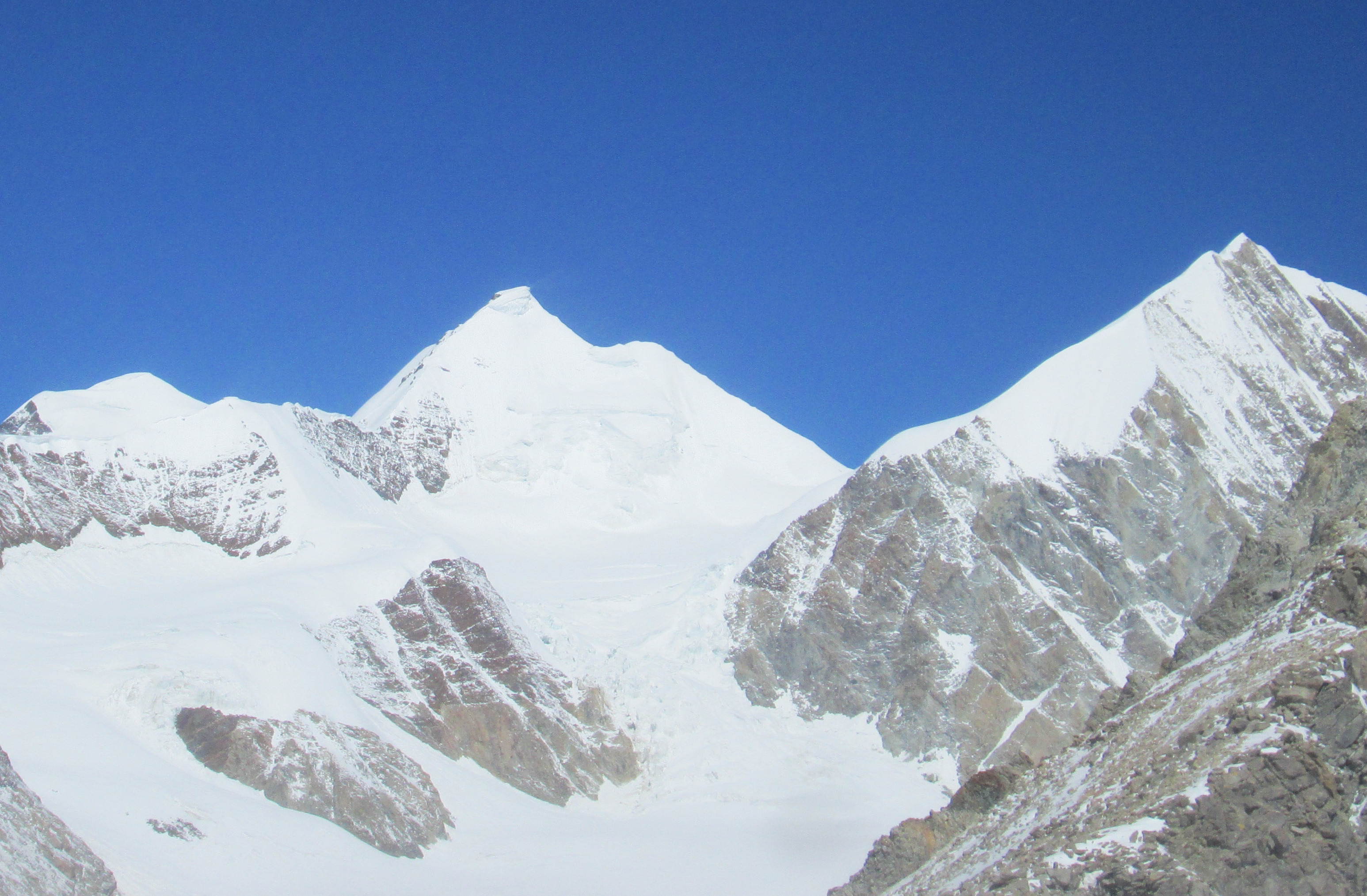
- Sri Kailash Peak

Highest point
- Elevation: 6,932 m (22,743 ft)
- Prominence: 1,112 m (3,648 ft)
- Listing: Ultra
- Coordinates: 31°01′03″N 79°10′39″E

Geography
- Location within Uttarakhand
- Location: Uttarakhand, India
- Parent range: Garhwal Himalaya

Climbing
- First ascent: It was first climbed by a German expedition led by R. Schwarzgruber on 16 October 1938

Sri Kailash (Hindi: श्री कैलाश) is a mountain in Uttarakhand, India, the 47th highest located entirely within India. Nanda Devi is the highest mountain in this category. Sri Kailash is the 204th highest peak in the world. The summit is 6932 meters or 22744 feet. It is the fourth highest mountain in the Gangotri region. The three higher peaks in this region are Chaukhamba (7134m), Satopanth (7075m), Kedarnath (6940m). It is situated at the head of The Raktvarn Glacier.

== Climbing history ==
It was first climbed by a German expedition led by Rudolf Schwarzgruber on 16 October 1938 by the west ridge. Besides Schwarzgruber, Edi Ellmauthaler, Walter Frauenberger and Rudolf Jonas reached the summit. The first successful Indian ascent of Sri Kailash was in 1963, led by D. Pandya. There were two unsuccessful attempts in 1977, Ranvir Singh led the Parvatarohi of Bombay and the other led by Vijay Mahajan of Giri-Bhraman Pune.

== Neighboring peaks ==
Sri Kailash neighboring or subsidiary peaks:

- Pilapani Parbat, 6,796 m (22,297 ft), prominence = 690 m 30°57′57″N 79°12′45″E
- Sudarshan Parbat, 6,507 m (21,348 ft), 30°38′57″N 79°05′36″E
- Mana Parbat I, 6,794 m (22178 ft) 30°56′59″N 79°14′30″E

== Glaciers and rivers ==
The Raktvarn Glacier. that met with Gangotri Glacier from there emerge the Bhagirathi river.

== See also ==
- Mount Kailash
- Panch Kailash, five sacred mountains named Kailash
- Om Parvat
- Om beach
- List of Himalayan peaks of Uttarakhand
