= Arwa Group =

Mountain group in Uttarakhand, India

The Arwa Group is a set of three Himalayan peaks, named Arwa Tower, Arwa Crest, and Arwa Spire, situated in the Chamoli district of Uttarakhand state, in northern India. They are situated on the south side of the southwest branch of the Arwa Valley, south of the dry lake Arwa Tal, and northwest of Badrinath. To their south lies the Bhagirath Kharak Glacier. Lying near the border with Tibet, these peaks have restricted access, and they have not been frequented by climbers until recently. However their steep, rocky profiles offer an extreme challenge to high-level rock climbers.

The three peaks lie close together and share a base camp. Reaching the base camp in the Arwa Valley, at an elevation of 4,350 m (14,270 ft), requires a three-day trek from Badrinath. All these peaks are on the Arwa-Bagneu divide and can also be approached from the south.

== Arwa Tower ==
Arwa Tower

Highest point
- Elevation: 6,352 m (20,840 ft)
- Coordinates: 30°50′36″N 79°23′03″E

Geography
- Location: Chamoli, Uttarakhand, India
- Parent range: Garhwal Himalaya

Climbing
- First ascent: 14 May 1999 by Mick Fowler and Steve Sustad
- Easiest route: rock/snow/ice on south face

The Arwa Tower is a peak with a huge rocky ridge along with a steep granite wall. The summit is a needle-like tower on the east ridge. The massif is flanked by many steep buttresses. The First ascent of the Tower was made by Britons Mick Fowler and Steve Sustad on 14 May 1999, via the northwest face. In May 2002, a French expedition led by Antoine de Choudens (with 11 members) climbed Arwa Tower by two different routes: a first ascent of the south face, and a new route on the northwest face. On 9 June 2007 Stephan Siegrist, Thomas Senf and Denis Burdet succeeded to climb the previously thought impossible to climb over-hanging north face route for the first time.

=== Routes ===
- North West Face.
- South Face - French Route
- North West Buttress - Pilier Guilhem Chaffiol
- North Face/East Ridge
- South Face - French route

== Arwa Spires ==
Arwa Spire (East)

Highest point
- Elevation: 6,193 m (20,318 ft)
- Coordinates: 30°49′36″N 79°21′44″E

Geography
- Location: Chamoli, Uttarakhand, India
- Parent range: Garhwal Himalaya

Climbing
- First ascent: 11 October 2000 by Andy Benson and Pete Benson (east spire, to base of summit pinnacle)
- Easiest route: rock/snow/ice on east ridge

The Arwa Spires are a series of stupendous rocky spires which offer highly challenging rock climbs. The spires have two main peaks, namely the main (or east) and west peaks. (However, there is some doubt about which peak is higher.) They are situated southwest of Arwa Tower. The first ascent of the east spire (to the base of a small summit pinnacle) was made in October 2000 by a British expedition led by Kenton Cool, via the east ridge. Andy Benson and Pete Benson made the first summit climb, followed five days later by Cool, Ian Parnell, and Al Powell.

=== Routes ===
- North East Ridge
- North Face, Right Hand Couloir
- North East Ridge
- North Face - Fior di Vite
- East Ridge - English route
- Capisco to West Summit

== Arwa Crest ==
Arwa Crest

Highest point
- Elevation: 6,250 m (20,510 ft)
- Coordinates: 30°52′12″N 79°15′36″E

Geography
- Location: Chamoli, Uttarakhand, India
- Parent range: Garhwal Himalaya

Climbing
- First ascent: 2002 Philippe Renard, Grégory Muffat Joly, Laurent Miston, and Antoine de Choudens
- Easiest route: rock/snow/ice on East ridge

Arwa Crest is the crest-like peak in the Arwa area. It is situated to the west of the Arwa Tower. The easiest route is via the north face. The first ascent was made, using this route, in 2002 by a French team including Philippe Renard, Grégory Muffat Joly, Laurent Miston, and Antoine de Choudens.

=== Routes ===
- North Face - French route
- East Ridge

== Nearby peaks ==
- Kamet
- Nilkantha
- Chaukamba

== Nearby glaciers ==
- Bhagirath Kharak Glacier
- Arwa Glacier

== See also ==
- List of mountain peaks of Uttarakhand
