= Gauri Parbat =

Mountain in Uttarakhand, India

- Ghori Parbat
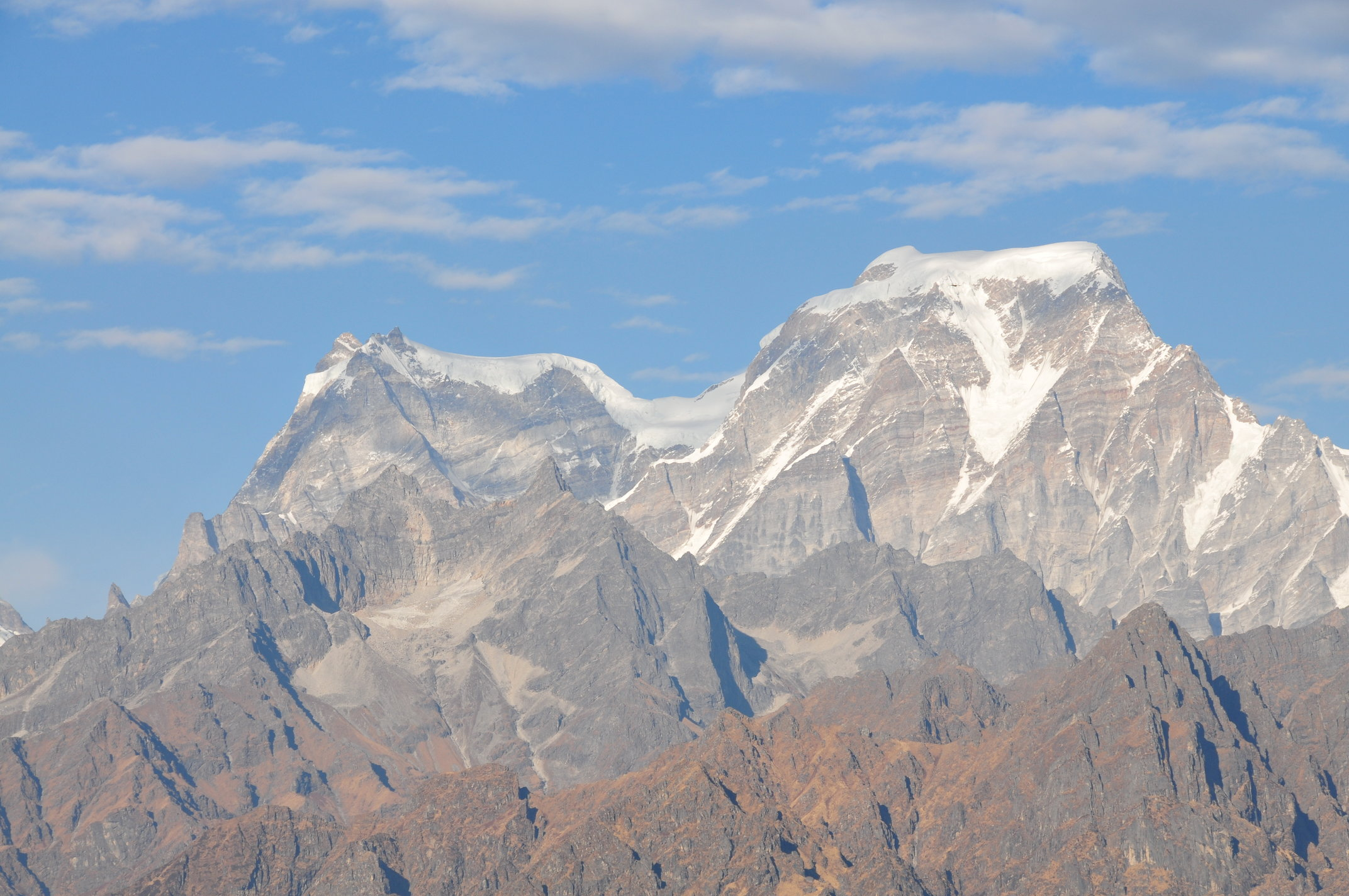
- Gauri Parbat (on the left) from Gurson Bugyal

Highest point
- Elevation: 6,708 m (22,008 ft)
- Prominence: 353 m (1,158 ft)
- Coordinates: 30°42′40″N 79°42′03″E

Geography
- Location within Uttarakhand
- Location: Uttarakhand, India
- Parent range: Garhwal Himalaya

Climbing
- First ascent: First ascent of Gauri Parbat was on 18 August 1939 by Andre Roch, Fritz Steuri and David Zogg and few sherpas

Gauri Parbat, also spelled Ghori Parbat is a mountain peak, located in Uttarakhand state, India and the height of the peak is 6,708 meters (22,008 feet). Also called "Horse" peak, it is near Joshimath and another peak nearby is Hathi parbat 6727 metres (22070 feet). As its height is 20,000 + feet, it was a popular destination for several mountaineering expeditions during 20th Century. Gauri Parbat along with Haathi Parbat, Nilgiri Parbat and other mountains of Kamet range tower over Valley of flowers.

== Ascent ==
First ascent of Gauri Parbat was on 18 August 1939 by Andre Roch, Fritz Steuri and David Zogg and few sherpas.
