= Pilapani Parbat =

Mountain in Uttarakhand, India

- Location within Uttarakhand

Highest point
- Elevation: 6,796 m (22,297 ft)
- Prominence: 599 m (1,965 ft)
- Coordinates: 30°57′57″N 79°12′45″E

Geography
- Location: Uttarakhand, India
- Parent range: Garhwal Himalaya

Climbing
- First ascent: yet to be climbed

Pilapani Parbat (Hindi:पीलापानी पर्वत) is a mountain of the Garhwal Himalaya in Uttarakhand India. The elevation of Pilapani Parbat is 6,796 metres (22,297 ft) and its prominence is 599 metres (1,965 ft). It is 33rd highest located entirely within Uttarakhand. Nanda Devi is the highest mountain in this category, and 488th highest in the world. Pilapani Parbat lies between the Sri Kailash6,932 metres (22,743 ft) and Mana Parbat III 6,730 metres (22,080 ft). Its nearest higher neighbor Sri Kailash lies 6.5 km NNW. It is located 9.5 km SE of Yogeshwar 6,678 metres (21,909 ft) and 11.7 km SW lies Bhagirathi Parbat II 6,512 metres (21,365 ft).

== Glacier and river ==
Pilapani Parbat lies at Pilapani Bamak at the head of Raktvarn glacier on the true left.

Other glaciers near by:

Nilapani Bamak, Arwa Bamak, Mana Bamak, Kalindi Bamak, Swetvarn Bamak, Gulligad Bamak, and Gangotri Glacier from there emerges the Bhagirathi river, one of the main tributaries of river Ganga. Raktvarn Bamak drains itself near Gomukh beside Gangotri Glacier and part of Bhagirathi river.

== Neighboring peaks ==
Neighboring peaks of Pilapani Parbat:

- Chirbas Parbat 6,529 metres (21,421 ft)31°02′03″N 79°03′09″E
- Matri 6,721 metres (22,051 ft)31°00′53″N 79°04′11″E
- Sudarshan Parbat 6,507 metres (21,348 ft)30°58′37″N 79°05′36″E
- Sri Kailash6,932 metres (22,743 ft)31°01′03″N 79°10′39″E
- Yogeshwar: 6,678 m (21,909 ft)30°59′56″N 79°07′03″E
- Mana Parbat II: 6,771 m (22,215 ft)30°57′05″N 79°15′15″E
- Kalindi peak: 6,102 m (20,020 ft)30°55′20″N 79°16′48″E
- Chandra Parbat I: 6,739 m (22,110 ft)30°52′19″N 79°15′25″E

== See also ==
- List of Himalayan peaks of Uttarakhand
