= Sangthang =

Peak in the Himalayas

Highest point
- Elevation: 6,480 m (21,260 ft)

Geography
- Location: Darchula District, Sudurpashchim Province, Nepal
- Parent range: Kumaon Himalaya

Sangthang (Nepali: साङ्थाङ) is the Himalayan peak in Kumaon Himalayas in Darchula District of Sudurpashchim state of Nepal. But this is in dispute by India.

== Location ==
It is situated in the easternmost part of Kumaun, lining Byans Valley. The peak is situated on Indo-Tibet border. The altitude of the peak is 21,262 feet (6,481 m). This peak is near to Om Parvat and famous Himalayan passes of Mangshya Dhura and Sin La in the Kuthi Valley.

== Ascent ==
The peak was climbed for the first time by Pradip Dasgupta and his party in 1968.

== See also ==
- Om Parvat
- Mount Kailash-Lake Manasarovar
