= Swachhand =

Mountain in Uttarakhand, India

- Location within Uttarakhand

Highest point
- Elevation: 6,721 m (22,051 ft)
- Prominence: 543 m (1,781 ft)
- Coordinates: 30°48′34″N 79°13′27″E

Geography
- Location: Uttarakhand, India
- Parent range: Garhwal Himalaya

Climbing
- First ascent: On the 23rd September 1938 Toni Meszner, and Leo Spannraft reached the summit of Swachhand peak by the south ridge.

Swachhand (Hindi: स्वछन्द) is a mountain of the Garhwal Himalayas in Uttarakhand, India. Swachhand is 6,721 metres (22,051 ft) high. Its peak is the 46th highest located entirely within the Uttrakhand. Nanda Devi is the highest mountain in this category. Swachhand lies between the Satopanth 7,075 metres (23,212 ft) NNW and Janhukut 6,805 metres (22,326 ft) SSE. It's neighbour Janhukut peaks at 3.8 km SSE. It is located 8.9 km NW of Chaukhamba I 7,138 metres (23,419 ft) and 8.9 km NW lies Bhagirathi I 6,856 metres (22,493 ft).

== Climbing history ==
In 1938, Professor Rudolf Schwarzgrubere, Edi Ellmauthaler, Dr Walter Frauenberger, Toni Meszner, and Leo Spannraft led a German expedition team consisting of five climbers and a medical officer to the Garhwal Himalaya. On September 23, Meszner and Spannraft reached the summit of Swachhand peak by the south ridge.

A UK team consisting of Malcolm Bass, Julian Clamp, and Simon Yearsley attempted to climb the west face of Swachand from Maiandi Bamak in October 1998 and reached up to 6,100 metres (20,013 ft).

In 2002, a Canadian team of John Miller, Conor Reynolds, and Guy Edwards approached the west face of Swachland through Maiandi Bamak. Miller and Edwards reached the summit on October 6. This was the second ascent of Swachhand.

== Glacier and rivers ==
Swachhand Bamak (Glacier) on the western side which later joins Gangotri Glacier. Maiandi Bamak (Glacier) on the southern side which also joins Gangotri glacier from there emerges Bhagirathi river one of the main tributaries of river Ganga. On the eastern side, the Bhagirathi Kharak Glacier merges with the Satopanth Glacier, from which the Alaknanda River emerges, one of the major tributaries of the Ganga.

== Neighboring peaks ==
Neighboring peaks of Swachhand:

- Janhukut 6,805 metres (22,326 ft)30°46′42″N 79°14′30″E
- Satopanth 7,075 metres (23,212 ft)31°50′42″N 79°12′45″E
- Chaukhamba I 7,138 metres (23,419 ft)30°44′59″N 79°17′28″E
- Bhagirathi I 6,856 metres (22,493 ft)31°51′00″N 79°08′57″E
- Kharchakund 6,612 metres (21,693 ft)30°46′50″N 79°07′44″E

== Peak data ==
Below are the details for the peak.

- Peak name: Swachhand
- Summit latitude: 30.80944
- Summit longitude: 79.22417
- Altitude in meters: 6721

== See also ==
- List of Himalayan peaks of Uttarakhand
