= Chaturbhuj (mountain) =

Mountain in Uttarakhand, India

- Location within Uttarakhand

Highest point
- Elevation: 6,654 m (21,831 ft)
- Prominence: 357 m (1,171 ft)
- Coordinates: 30°59′41″N 79°05′37″E

Geography
- Location: Uttarakhand, India
- Parent range: Garhwal Himalaya

Climbing
- First ascent: on 5 June 1981 by Hubert Odier, Alain de Blanchaud and Jacques Giraud of An Indo-French Expedition led by Harish Kapadia.

Chaturbhuj (Hindi: चतुर्भुज) is a mountain of the Garhwal Himalaya in Uttarakhand, India. The elevation of Chaturbhuj is 6,654 metres (21,831 ft) and its prominence is 357 metres (1,171 ft). It is 52nd highest located entirely within the Uttrakhand. Nanda Devi, is the highest mountain in this category. Chaturbhuj lies between the Matri 6,721 metres (22,051 ft) and Shwetvarn 6,340 metres (20,801 ft). Its nearest higher neighbor Yogeshwar lies 2.7 km east. It is located 5.9 km NW of chirbas Parbat 6,529 metres (21,421 ft) and 8.5 km east lies Sri Kailash 6,932 metres (22,743 ft).

== Climbing history ==
An Indo-French expedition led by Harish Kapadia had the privilege of First ascent on 5 June 1981. The Summiters are Hubert Odier, Alain de Blanchaud and Jacques Giraud. They Started from camp on Swetvarn Bamak to a col in the north. Then followed the north ridge to the summit. Chaturbhuj was never attempted before this.

== Glaciers and rivers ==
Gulligad Bamak lies on the Northern side of Chaturbhuj from where Gulligad nala emerges and it joins Jadhganga river between Naga and Neylong. which later joins Bhagirathi river near Bharion ghati one of the main tributaries of river Ganga. On the south east side lies Swetvarn Glacier which joins Raktvarn Glacier and Raktvarn drain itself near Gomukh beside Gangotri Glacier and part of Bhagirathi river. Bhagirathi River comes out From the snout of Gangotri Glacier. Bhagirathi joins the Alaknanda River the other main tributaries of river Ganga at Dev Prayag and called Ganga there after.

== Neighboring peaks ==
Neighboring peaks of Chaturbhuj:

- Chirbas Parbat 6,529 metres (21,421 ft)31°02′03″N 79°03′09″E
- Matri 6,721 metres (22,051 ft)31°00′53″N 79°04′11″E
- Sudarshan Parbat 6,507 metres (21,348 ft)30°58′37″N 79°05′36″E
- Kalidhang 6,373 metres (20,909 ft)31°02′40″N 79°01′20″E
- Yogeshwar: 6,678 m (21,909 ft)30°59′56″N 79°07′03″E

== See also ==
- List of Himalayan peaks of Uttarakhand
