= Chandra Parbat I =

Mountain in Uttarakhand, India

- Chandra Parbat
- Location within Uttarakhand

Highest point
- Elevation: 6,739 m (22,110 ft)
- Prominence: 528 m (1,732 ft)
- Coordinates: 30°52′19″N 79°15′25″E

Geography
- Location: Uttarakhand, India
- Parent range: Garhwal Himalaya

Climbing
- First ascent: In 1938, a six-member Austrian team led by Prof. R. Schwarzgruber, had made the first ascent of Chandra Parbat I

Chandra Parbat I is a mountain of the Garhwal Himalaya in Uttarakhand, India. Chandra Parbat I stands at 6,739 metres (22,110 ft). It is 42nd highest located entirely within the Uttrakhand. Nanda Devi, is the highest mountain in this category. Chandra Parbat I lies on the eastern bank of the Suralaya Glacier. It is located between Chandra II (North west) and Chandra III (South). It is located 4.9 km NE of Satopanth 7,075 metres (23,212 ft) and 8 km west lies Vasuki South 6,702 metres (21,988 ft). On the 7.4 km SWS lies the Swachhand Peak 6,721 metres (22,051 ft) and Bhgirathi Massif on the west side.

== Climbing History ==
An Australian team of eight members climbed the Chandra Parbat I (6739 meters, 22,110 feet) On September 25, 1994. The team members are Darren Miller, Gavin Dunmall, Glen Tempest, James Serie, Peter Williams, Andrew McNeill, Grant Else and Sarah Boyle. They established their Base Camp below Vasuki Parbat and Advance Base at the junction of the Chaturangi and Suralaya Glaciers. They climbed the 70° northwest face to the summit. Darren Miller made a route up the ridge and then up the face to the left of the Tempest-Serle route. On September 25, they climbed a steep rock until the snow line at 6200 meters. At 5:45 they were on the summit.

== Glaciers and rivers ==
It is surrounded by glaciers on both sides Suralaya Glacier on the western side, sweta Bamak on the eastern side. Both glaciers joins with Chaturangi Glacier, and Chaturangi Glacier joins with Gangotri Glacier from there emerges the river Bhagirathi the main tributaries of river Ganga.

== Neighboring peaks ==
Neighboring peaks of Chandra Parbat I:

- Mana Parbat I: 6,794 m (22,290 ft)30°56′59″N 79°14′30″E
- Mana Parbat II: 6,771 m (22,215 ft)30°57′05″N 79°15′15″E
- Kalindi peak: 6,102 m (20,020 ft)30°55′20″N 79°16′48″E
- Pilapani Parbat: 6,796 m (22,297 ft)30°57′57″N 79°12′45″E
- Satopanth: 7,075 m (23,212 ft)30°50′42″N 79°12′45″E

== See also ==
- List of Himalayan peaks of Uttarakhand
