= Mana Parbat I =

Mountain in Uttarakhand, India

- Location within Uttarakhand

Highest point
- Elevation: 6,794 m (22,290 ft)
- Prominence: 263 m (863 ft)
- Coordinates: 30°56′59″N 79°14′30″E

Geography
- Location: Uttarakhand, India
- Parent range: Garhwal Himalaya

Mana Parbat I (Hindi: माना पर्वत I) is a mountain of the Garhwal Himalaya in Uttarakhand, India. Mana Parbat I stands at 6,794 metres (22,290 ft). It is the 34th highest located entirely within the Uttrakhand. Nanda Devi, is the highest mountain in this category. It is the 490th highest peak in the world. Mana Parbat I located 6,771 metres (22,215 ft) just west of Mana Parbat II and 6,102 metres (20,020 ft) north west of Kalindi Peak. The Chandra Parbat I lies 6,739 metres (22,110 ft) on the south side and Pilapani Parbat lies 6,796 metres (22,297 ft) on the north west side.

== Climbing history ==
In 1996 a Korean expedition team of ten members, led by Min Kyu-Chung, attempted Mana Parbat I but aborted due to avalanche conditions.

== Glaciers and rivers ==
It is surrounded by glaciers on all the sides: Kalindi Glacier on the southern side, Arwa Glacier on the eastern side, Mana Glacier on the northern side and Raktavarn Glacier on the western side.

== Neighboring peaks ==
Neighboring peaks of Mana Parbat II:

- Mana Parbat II: 6,771 m (22,215 ft)30°57′05″N 79°15′15″E
- Kalindi peak: 6,102 m (20,020 ft)30°55′20″N 79°16′48″E
- Pilapani Parbat: 6,796 m (22,297 ft)30°57′57″N 79°12′45″E
- Chandra Parbat I: 6,739 m (22,110 ft)30°52′19″N 79°15′25″E

== See also ==
- List of Himalayan peaks of Uttarakhand
