= Mana Parbat II =

Mountain in Uttarakhand, India

- Location within Uttarakhand

Highest point
- Elevation: 6,771 m (22,215 ft)
- Prominence: 341 m (1,119 ft)
- Coordinates: 30°57′05″N 79°15′15″E

Geography
- Location: Uttarakhand, India
- Parent range: Garhwal Himalaya

Climbing
- First ascent: In 1995 an Indian expedition.

Mana Parbat II (Hindi: माना पर्वत II) is a mountain of the Garhwal Himalaya in Uttarakhand, India. Mana Parbat II standing majestically at 6,771 metres (22,215 ft). It is the 39th highest located entirely within the Uttrakhand. Nanda Devi, is the highest mountain in this category. It is the 528th highest peak in the world. Mana Parbat II located just east of Mana Parbat I 6794 metres and south east of Kalindi Peak 6102 metres. On the south side lies the Chandra Parbat I 6739 metres and Pilapani Parbat 6796 metres on the north west side.

== Climbing history ==
Mana Parbat is a group of four peaks, all of which are above 6,700 metres (21,980 ft). It lies on the Kalindi Glacier. In 1995 a three-member team of Vinay Hedge (leader), Rajesh Gadgil established Base Camp at Khada Pathar on May 27. C1 (5242 metres) and C2 (5515 metres) on the Kalindi Glacier, and C3 at 5700 metres. Their final summit camp C4 (6121 metres). On June 5, an initial attempt made on the southwest ridge, but later turned to north/northwest ridge. Fixing about 280 metres of rope to reach the summit (6771 metres). This was the second ascent of Mana Parbat II. In 1996 A Korean expedition team of ten-member led by Min Kyu-Chung. A summit camp was established around 6200 metres. on September 12 by the west ridge B.R. Cho and J.K. Lee reached the summit of Mana Parbat II (6771 m). Earlier the team had attempted Mana Parbat I but aborted due to avalanche conditions.

== Glaciers and rivers ==
It is surrounded by glaciers on all the sides: Kalindi Glacier on the southern side, Arwa Glacier on the eastern side, and Mana Glacier on the northern side.

== Neighboring peaks ==
Neighboring peaks of Mana Parbat II:

- Mana Parbat I: 6,794 m (22,290 ft)30°56′59″N 79°14′30″E
- Kalindi peak: 6,102 m (20,020 ft)30°55′20″N 79°16′48″E
- Pilapani Parbat: 6,796 m (22,297 ft)30°57′57″N 79°12′45″E
- Chandra Parbat I: 6,739 m (22,110 ft)30°52′19″N 79°15′25″E

== See also ==
- List of Himalayan peaks of Uttarakhand
