= Kalidhang =

Mountain in Uttarakhand, India

- Location within Uttarakhand

Highest point
- Elevation: 6,373 m (20,909 ft)
- Prominence: 567 m (1,860 ft)
- Coordinates: 31°02′40″N 79°1′20″E

Geography
- Location: Uttarakhand, India
- Parent range: Garhwal Himalaya

Kalidhang is a mountain of the Garhwal Himalaya in Uttarakhand India. It is situated in the Gangotri National Park. The elevation of Kalidhang is 6,373 metres (20,909 ft) and its prominence is 563 metres (1,847 ft). It is joint 105th highest located entirely within the Uttrakhand. Nanda Devi, is the highest mountain in this category. It lies 3 km WNW of Chirbas Parbat 6,529 metres (21,421 ft) its nearest higher neighbor. Matri 6,721 metres (22,051 ft) lies 5.7 km SE and it is 11.8 km NNE of Manda I 6,510 metres (21,358 ft). It lies 10.1 km NNW of Sudarshan Parbat 6,507 metres (21,348 ft).

== Neighboring peaks ==
Neighboring peaks of Kalidhang:

- Chirbas Parbat 6,529 metres (21,421 ft)31°02′03″N 79°03′09″E
- Chaturbhuj 6,654 metres (21,831 ft)30°59′41″N 79°05′37″E
- Matri 6,721 metres (22,051 ft)31°00′53″N 79°04′11″E
- Sudarshan Parbat 6,507 metres (21,348 ft)30°58′37″N 79°05′36″E
- Yogeshwar: 6,678 m (21,909 ft)30°59′56″N 79°07′03″E

== Glaciers and rivers ==
It stands at the head of Dehigad Bamak which flows from south to north and joins river Jadh Ganga. Chaudar Bamak on the west side also drains down to Jadh Ganga. On the south west side lies Deogad Bamak which drains into Bhagirathi river between chirbas and Gangotri. Chirbas Bamak and Gulli gad bamak on the eastern side from there emerges gulligad which also joins Jadh Ganga near Neylong. that further joins Bhagirathi River near Bharion ghati. one of the main tributaries of river Ganga. that later joins Alaknanda River the other main tributaries of river Ganga at Devprayag and became Ganga there after. The word "Bamak" is used for Glacier.

== See also ==
- List of Himalayan peaks of Uttarakhand
