= Matri (mountain) =

Mountain in Uttarakhand, India

- Location within Uttarakhand

Highest point
- Elevation: 6,721 m (22,051 ft)
- Prominence: 641 m (2,103 ft)
- Coordinates: 31°00′53″N 79°04′11″E

Geography
- Location: Uttarakhand, India
- Parent range: Garhwal Himalaya

Matri (Hindi: मातृ) is a mountain of the Garhwal Himalaya in Uttarakhand, India. Matri standing majestically at 6,721 metres (22,051 ft). It is joint 46th highest located entirely within the Uttrakhand. Nanda Devi, is the highest mountain in this category. Matri lies between the Chaturbhuj 6,654 metres (21,831 ft) and Chirbas Parbat 6,529 metres (21,421 ft). Its nearest higher neighbor Sri Kailash lies 10.3 km east. It is located 4.6 km NW of Sudarshan Parbat 6,507 metres (21,348 ft) and 5.7 km NW lies Kalidhang 6,373 metres (20,909 ft).

== climbing history ==
Three Indian girls from Paribhraman a team from Ahmedabad Gujrat climbed Matri (22,047 feet) On June 20, 1963. An Indian team led by Prajapati Bhodane reached the summit of Matri On September 11, 1991, It was climbed by Prasad and Sher Singh through the southwest ridge. They followed the Matri Glacier from Chirbas.

== Glaciers and rivers ==
Matri Bamak on the southern side from where Matri nala emerges and it joins Bhagirathi river near Chirbas. Bhagirathi the main tributaries of the river Ganga. On the Northern side Gulli gad bamak from there emerges Gulli gad which later joins Jadh Ganga near Neylong. That further joins Bhagirathi river near Bhairion ghati. Bhagirathi later joins Alaknanda River the other main tributaries of the river Ganga at Dev Prayag and became Ganga there after. The word Bamak is used for Glacier and Gad for River.

== Neighboring peaks ==
Neighboring peaks of Matri:

- Chaturbhuj 6,654 metres (21,831 ft)30°59′41″N 79°05′37″E
- Chirbas Parbat 6,529 metres (21,421 ft)31°02′03″N 79°03′09″E
- Sudarshan Parbat 6,507 metres (21,348 ft)30°58′37″N 79°05′36″E
- Kalidhang 6,373 metres (20,909 ft)31°02′40″N 79°01′20″E
- Yogeshwar: 6,678 m (21,909 ft)30°59′56″N 79°07′03″E

== See also ==
- List of Himalayan peaks of Uttarakhand
