= Satopanth =

Mountain in Uttarakhand, India

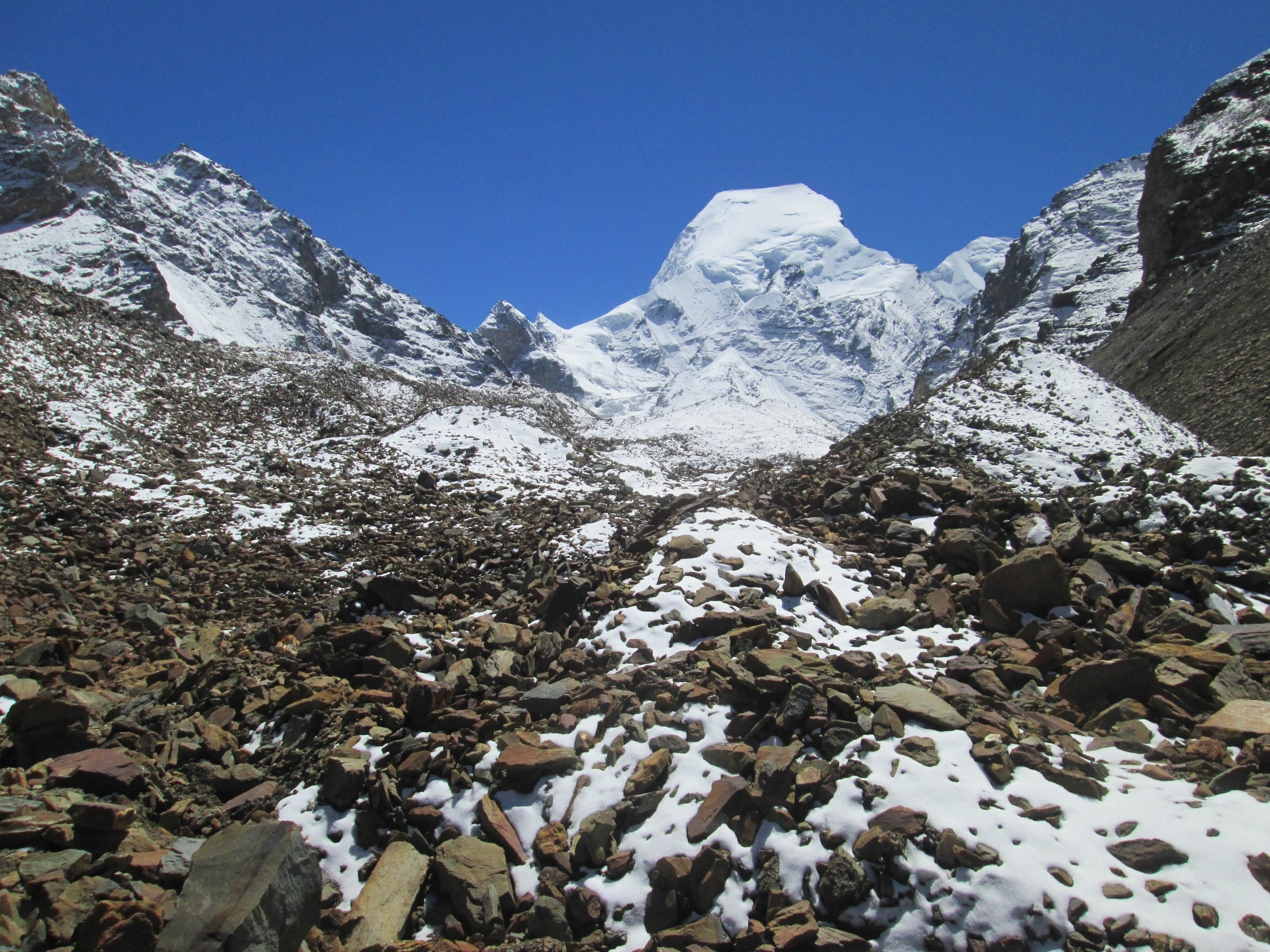
- Mt Satopanth during Wikipedia treks Kalindi Khal

Highest point
- Elevation: 7,084 m (23,241 ft)
- Prominence: 1,070 m (3,510 ft)
- Listing: Mountains of India
- Coordinates: 30°50′28″N 79°12′49″E

Geography
- Location within India
- Country: India
- State: Uttarakhand
- Region: Gangotri
- Parent range: Garhwal Himalayas

Climbing
- First ascent: 1 August 1947 by André Roch, René Dittert, Alexandre Graven and Alfred Sutter
- Easiest route: AD Grade snow/ice climb

Mount Satopanth (7084m) is one of the prominent peaks of the Garhwal range in the Himalayas, located within the Indian subcontinent. It is also the second highest peak in Gangotri National Park.

== Location ==
Satopanth is a mountain in the Gangotri region of the Garhwal Himalaya, in the Indian Himalayas. It lies in the northern Indian state of Uttarakhand. The nomenclature of the peak is derived by an amalgamation of two Sanskrit words “Sato” meaning ‘Truth’ and “Panth” meaning “A Figure of veneration or Devotion” when combined means "The True Figure of Devotion and Veneration".

== Climbing history ==
The mountain was first climbed successfully by a Swiss expedition in 1947, 15 days prior to the Indian independence, the team was led by André Roch. Lately the mountain has become quite famous for its pre-Everest expeditions, because of her majestic altitude, the daunting ‘knife ridge’ at 6,500 m (21,300 ft) and the technical ice and rock glacial negotiations at 5,900 m (19,400 ft).

In 1933 Marco Pallis led an expedition to the Gangotri area of the Himalayas and the team climbed several peaks. The expedition team reconnoitered Satopanth and during the expedition Colin Kirkus and Charles Warren made a pioneering alpine-style ascent of the central or 'second Satopanth peak', Kirkus' account of that climb is included in Pallis's book Peaks and Lamas. The peak they climbed is now known to be the 6,454 metres (21,175 ft) Bhagirathi III;
