= Sudarshan Parbat =

Mountain in Uttarakhand, India

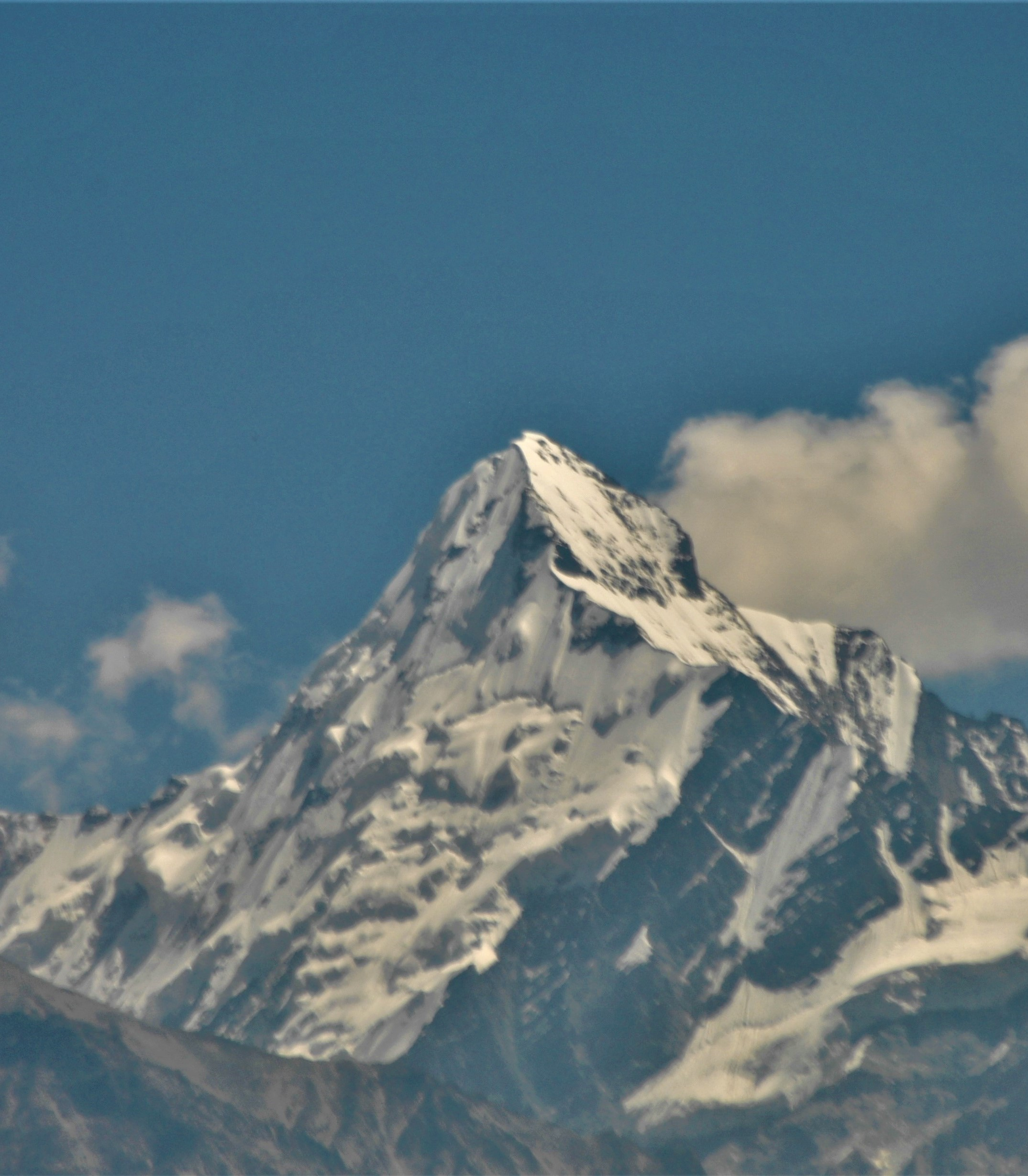
- Sudarshan Parbat

Highest point
- Elevation: 6,507 m (21,348 ft)
- Prominence: 456 m (1,496 ft)
- Coordinates: 30°58′37″N 79°05′36″E

Geography
- Location within Uttarakhand
- Location: Uttarakhand, India
- Parent range: Garhwal Himalaya

Climbing
- First ascent: An Indo French expedition, led by Harish Kapadia on 30 May 1981 by the east ridge.

Sudarshan Parbat is a mountain of the Garhwal Himalaya in Uttarakhand India.The elevation of Sudarshan Parbat is 6,529 metres (21,421 ft) and its prominence is 456 metres (1,496 ft). It is joint 87th highest located entirely within the Uttrakhand. Nanda Devi, is the highest mountain in this category. Sudarshan Parbat lies 2.1 km south of Chaturbhuj 6,654 metres (21,831 ft) and 3.3 km west of Shyamvarn 6,135 metres (20,128 ft). Its nearest higher neighbor Chaturbhuj. It is located 3.7 km SW of Yogeshwar 6,678 metres (21,909 ft) and 9.9 km SW lies Manda I 6,511 metres (21,362 ft).

== Climbing history ==
An Indo French expedition of eleven member, four French and seven Indian climbers led by Harish Kapadia attempt Sudarshan and six other peaks surrounding the Swetvarn Bamak. There are some previous claims of first summit of Sudarshan, later found false. On 30 May 1981 First ascent by the east ridge. The Summiters are Hubert Odier, Alain de Blanchaud, Zerksis Boga, Lakhpa Tsering, Bernard Odier and Jacques Giraud. They fixed some 1500 ft of rope on some difficult sections of ice. From the final camp they took six hours to reach the summit.

== Glaciers and rivers ==
Swetvarn Bamak on the Eastern side. Thelu bamak on the Southern side both these Glaciers are tributaries of Raktvarn Bamak which drain itself at Gangotri Glacier. from there emerges Bhagirathi river. one of the main tributaries of river Ganga.

== Neighboring peaks ==
Neighboring peaks of Sudarshan Parbat:

- Chaturbhuj 6,654 metres (21,831 ft)30°59′41″N 79°05′37″E
- Matri 6,721 metres (22,051 ft)31°00′53″N 79°04′11″E
- Swetvarn 6,340 metres (20,801 ft)30°59′12″N 79°05′54″E
- Kalidhang 6,373 metres (20,909 ft)31°02′40″N 79°01′20″E
- Yogeshwar 6,678 m (21,909 ft)30°59′56″N 79°07′03″E
- Thelu 6,000 metres (19,685 ft)

== See also ==
- List of Himalayan peaks of Uttarakhand
