= Yogeshwar (mountain) =

Mountain in Uttarakhand, India

- Location within Uttarakhand

Highest point
- Elevation: 6,678 m (21,909 ft)
- Prominence: 295 m (968 ft)
- Coordinates: 30°59′56″N 79°07′03″E

Geography
- Location: Uttarakhand, India
- Parent range: Garhwal Himalaya

Climbing
- First ascent: 1991 by a Bombay team led by Ramakant Mahadik

Yogeshwar (Hindi: योगेश्‍वर) is a mountain of the Garhwal Himalaya in Uttarakhand, India. The elevation of Yogeshwar is 6,678 metres (21,909 ft) and its prominence is 295 metres (968 ft). It is joint 52nd highest located entirely within the Uttarakhand. Nanda Devi, is the highest mountain in this category. Yogeshwar lies on the ridge between Chaturbhuj 6,654 metres (21,831 ft) and Sri Kailash 6,932 metres (22,743 ft). Its nearest higher neighbor unnamed peak 6,715 metres (22,031 ft) lies 2.7 km N. It is located 2.7 km east of Chaturbhuj 6,654 metres (21,831 ft) and 5 km NW lies Matri 6,450 metres (21,161 ft).

== Climbing history ==
A four-man British team comprising Simon Yearsley, Steve Adderley, Malcolm Bass and Julian Clamp used the Swetvarn Glacier for their approach to Yogeshwar. On October 2, except Steve Adderley other three made the second ascent of Yogeshwar (6678 meters, 21,910 feet) by a new dangerous south face route. They thought they are making the first ascent, without knowing that in June, 1991 an Indian team led by Ramakant Mahadik had climbed Yogeshwar by the southeast ridge. They established their Base Camp and Advance Base camp at 4800 and 5500 meters. Steve and Julian made an attempt on the west ridge on 24 September. They gained this via the north col between Yogeshwar and Chaturbhuj (6655 m), but came back from 6200 m in the face of unstable snow condition on the ridge.

== Glaciers and rivers ==
There are four glaciers around Yogeshwar two on the northern side and two on the southern side. On the southern side Swetvarn Glacier on the south west side and Shyamvarn Glacier on the south east side both these glacier joins Raktvarn Glacier which itself ultimately drains near Gangotri glacier from where emerges Bhagirathi river the main tributaries of river Ganga. On the Northern side, Gulligad Glacier on the north west side and Lambigad Glacier on the north east side both this glacier drains down to Jadh Ganga which also met Bhagirathi river near Bharionghati. Bhagirathi joins the Alaknanda River the other main tributaries of river Ganga at Dev Prayag and called Ganga there after.

== Neighboring peaks ==
Neighboring peaks of Yogeshwar :

- Chaturbhuj 6,654 metres (21,831 ft)30°59′41″N 79°05′37″E
- Matri 6,721 metres (22,051 ft)31°00′53″N 79°04′11″E
- Sudarshan Parbat 6,507 metres (21,348 ft)30°58′37″N 79°05′36″E
- Kalidhang 6,373 metres (20,909 ft)31°02′40″N 79°01′20″E
- Sri Kailash: 6,932 m (22,743 ft)31°01′03″N 79°10′39″E

== See also ==
- List of Himalayan peaks of Uttarakhand
