= Vasuki Parbat South =

Mountain in Uttarakhand, India

- P 6702
- Location within Uttarakhand

Highest point
- Elevation: 6,702 m (21,988 ft)
- Prominence: 280 m (920 ft)
- Coordinates: 30°51′33″N 79°10′29″E

Geography
- Location: Uttarakhand, India
- Parent range: Garhwal Himalaya

Climbing
- First ascent: A Japanese Takaaki Fujii made a solo ascent on September 24, 1984.

Vasuki Parbat South is a mountain of the Garhwal Himalaya in Uttarakhand, India. The elevation of Vasuki Parbat South is 6,702 metres (21,988 ft) and its prominence is 280 metres (919 ft). It is 49th highest located entirely within the Uttrakhand. Nanda Devi, is the highest mountain in this category. It lies 1.6 km south of Vasuki Parbat its nearest higher neighbor 6,792 metres (22,283 ft) and 2.7 km east of Bhagirathi Parbat I 6,856 metres (22,493 ft). It is located 4.6 km SE of Bhagirathi Parbat II 6,512 metres (21,365 ft) and 4.1 km SE lies Satopanth 7,075 metres (23,212 ft).

== Gangotri National Park ==
The entire surrounding area are protected within the 2,390 km^{2} (920 sq mi) Gangotri National Park, one of the largest conservation area in India. The Gangotri National Park is home to several world-class treks, including Gangotri Gomukh Tapoban Nandanvan, Kerdarnath Vasuki tal trek, Har ki dun valley trek, Badrinath to Satopanth tal trek, Gangotri to Kedar tal trek, Gangotri to Badrinath trek via Kalindi khal and many more.

== Climbing history ==
In 1984 A six-man Japanese expedition led by Kijoji Aizawa when failed to climb Bhagirathi I, one of the members, Takaaki Fujii made a solo ascent of P 6702 (21,988 feet) on September 24.

September 4, 1988 three Italians Massimo Marchegianni, Tiziano Cantalamessa and Marcello Ceci claimed the first ascent of Vasuki Parbat South (21,988 feet). They reached the summit in alpine-style in four days climbing the east face. They approached the peak via Nandanban and the Chaturangi Glacier and Sundar Glacier.

== Neighboring and subsidiary peaks ==
neighboring peaks of Vasuki Parbat South:

- Vasuki Parbat, 6,792m (22,283 ft), 30°52′30″N 79°10′30″E
- Satopanth, 7,075m (23,212 ft), 30°50′42″N 79°12′45″E
- Bhagirathi Parbat I, 6,856m (22493 ft)30°51′00″N 79°08′57″E
- Bhagirathi Parbat II, 6,512m (21365 ft)30°52′55″N 79°08′01″E
- Bhagirathi Parbat III, 6,454m (21175 ft)30°52′09″N 79°08′01″E
- Shivling, 6,543m (21467 ft)30°52′49.48″N 79°03′48.49″E

== Glaciers and rivers ==
Vasuki Parbat is surrounded by the Vasuki Glacier on the west side and Sundar Bamak (Glacier) on the east side northern side is surrounded by Chaturangi Glacier. Vasuki Glacier and Sundar Glacier merge with Chaturangi Glacier. Chaturangi Glacier merge with Gangotri Glacier from the snout of Gangotri Glacier emerges Bhagirathi river also called Ganga or Ganges after it meets Alaknanda at Dev Pryag.

== See also ==
- List of Himalayan peaks of Uttarakhand
