= Bhagirathi Parbat IV =

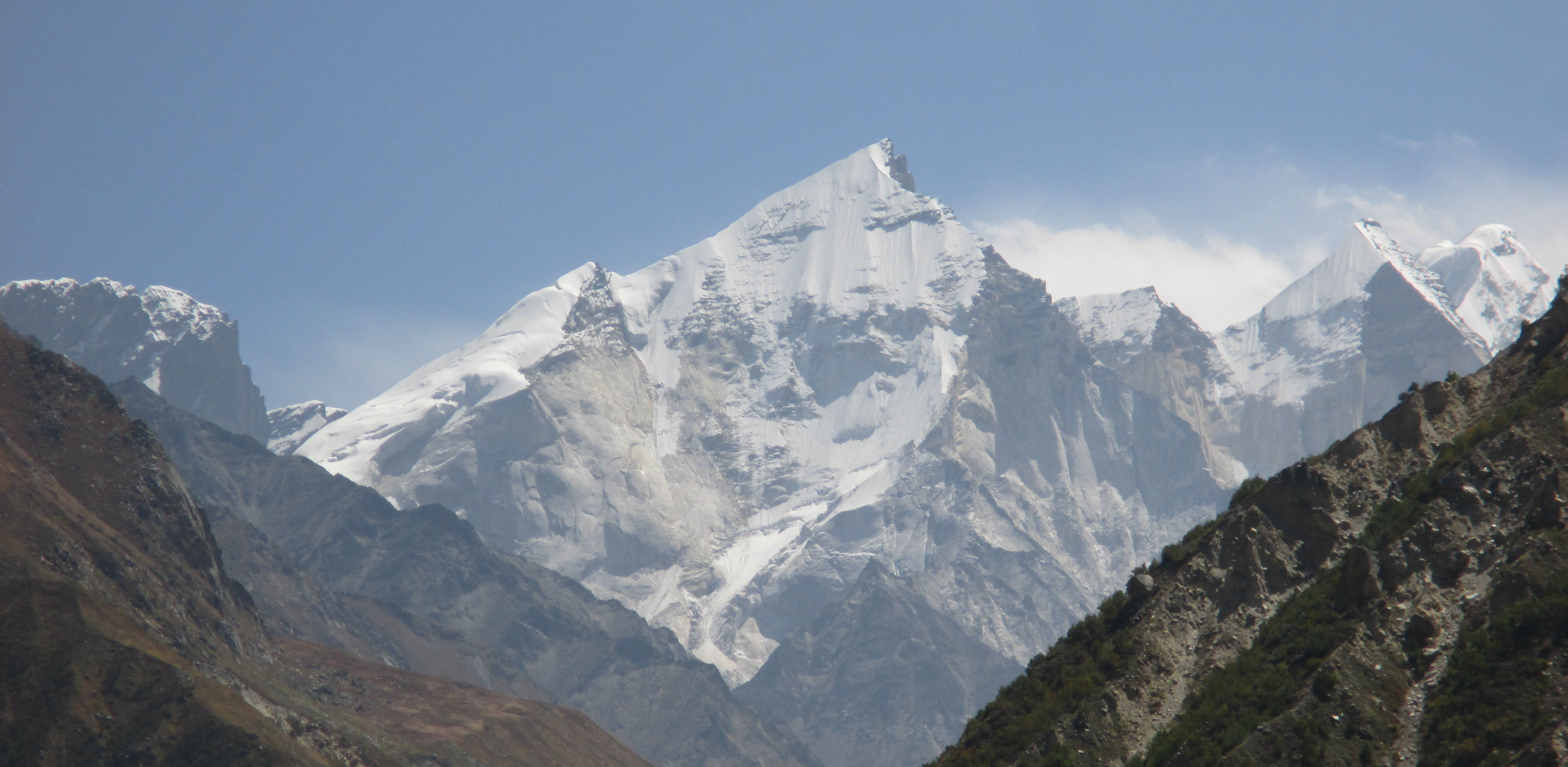
- from left to right Vasuki Parbat, Bhagirathi Parbat II, IV, III, I

Highest point
- Elevation: 6,193 m (20,318 ft)
- Coordinates: 30°52′35″N 79°07′59″E

Geography
- Location within Uttarakhand
- Location: Uttarakhand, India
- Parent range: Garhwal Himalaya

Climbing
- First ascent: Slovenians Rok Blagus, Luka Lindic, and Marko Prezelj climbed and descended west face for the first time in 2009.

Bhagirathi Parbat IV (Hindi: भागीरथी पर्वत IV) is a mountain in Uttarakhand, India. The summit is 6,193 metres (20,318 ft). It is the fourth highest peak in the Bhagirathi Massif. It is located between Gangotri Glacier and Vasuki Glacier.

== Climbing history ==
In 2009 three Slovenians, Rok Blagus, Luka Lindic, and Marko Prezelj, climbed and descended the west face of Bhagirathi IV in a single day, the first reported ascent of this peak. In 1994, Matjaz Jamnik and Silvo Karo also Slovenian, tried and reached up to 5,500 m (18,045 ft), but due to bad weather could not make it to the summit.

== Neighboring and subsidiary peaks ==
- Bhagirathi Parbat I, 6,856 m (22493 ft), 30°51′00″N 79°08′57″E
- Bhagirathi Parbat II, 6,512 m (21365 ft), 30°52′55″N 79°08′01″E
- Bhagirathi Parbat III, 6,454 m (21175 ft), 30°52′09″N 79°08′01″E
- Satopanth, 7,075 m (23,212 ft), 30°50′42″N 79°12′45″E
- Vasuki Parbat, 6,792 m (22,283 ft), 30°52′30″N 79°10′30″E

== Glaciers and rivers ==
The Gangotri Glacier is on the west side, Vasuki Glacier is on the east side, and Chaturangi Glacier is on the north side. From the snout of Gangotri Glacier emerges Bhagirathi river, also called Ganga or Ganges.

== See also ==
- List of Himalayan peaks of Uttarakhand
