= Bhagirathi Massif =

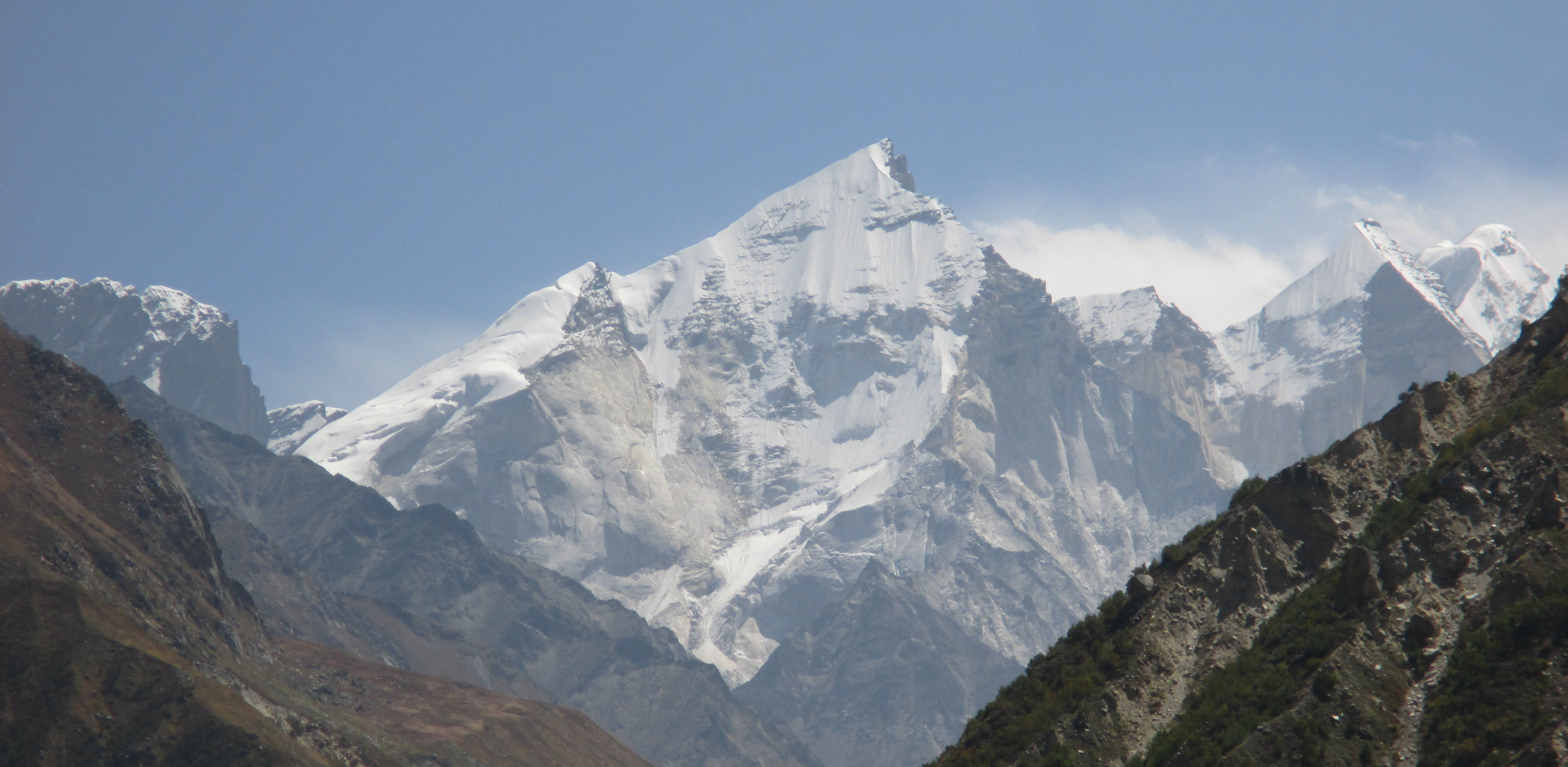
- from left to right Vasuki Parbat, Bhagirathi Parbat II, IV, III, I

Highest point
- Elevation: 6,856 m (22,493 ft)
- Prominence: 672 m (2,205 ft)
- Coordinates: 30°51′00″N 79°08′57″E

Geography
- Location within Uttarakhand
- Location: Uttarakhand, India
- Parent range: Garhwal Himalaya

Climbing
- First ascent: The first ascent by Japanese Expedition 1980.

Bhagirathi Massif or Bhagirathi Group (Hindi: भागीरथी ) is a mountain range of Garhwal Himalaya in Gangotri Glacier Uttarakhand India, It has four peaks between 6856 meter and 6193 meter. The Bhagirathi I summits is 6856 meter or 22493 feet. It was first climbed by A Japanese team in 1980. It is surrounded by Glaciers on four side on the eastern side of the Massif is Vasuki Glacier, on the western side its Gangotri Glacier the main glacier in this area, northern side is surrounded by Chaturangi Glacier and southern side guarded by Swachhhand Glacier.

The entire massif and surrounding area are protected within the 2,390 km^{2} (920 sq mi) Gangotri National Park, the third largest national park in India. The Gangotri National Park is home to several world-class treks, including Gangotri Gomukh Tapoban, Kerdarnath Vasuki tal trek. Har ki dun valley trek.

== Climbing history ==
Bhagirathi I was first climbed by a Japanese expedition team via its south-east ridge in 1980. They used around 2000 m rope for fixing and technical climbing. The second climb happened in 1983 by a British team led by Martin Moran and his three friends John Mothersele, Charlie Heard and Kevin Flint via the west ridge. On 21 August, Martin Moran and Charlie Heard reached the summit around 4.30 pm; the next day on 22 August, Charlie Heard died from a fall while abseiling.

Bhagirathi II was the first ascent by Austrians Edi Ellmauthaler and Toni Messner in 1933. The first Indian success on this peak came on 20 October 1966. Govinda Raj, Amar Ray, and two Sherpas, Karma and Gyalboo climbed to the summit after a ten-hour of a difficult climb. while coming back from a summit in a freak accident Amar Ray, and two Sherpas Karma and Gyalboo died while Govinda Raj got frostbite.

Bhagirathi III was the first ascent by Britishers Colin Kirkus and Charles Warren reached the summit for the first time in 1933. The first Indian success on this peak came on 20 October 1966. Janez Jeglic and Silvo Karo climbed the overhanging west face on 7 September 1990.

First ascent of Bhagirathi IV In 2009 three Slovenians friend Rok Blagus, Luka Lindic, and Marko Prezelj climbed and descended west face of Bhagirathi IV in a single day first reported ascent of this peak. in 1994 Matjaz Jamnik and Silvo Karo another Slovenians tried and reached up to 5500 meters in eleven attempts, but due to bad weather could not make it to the summit.

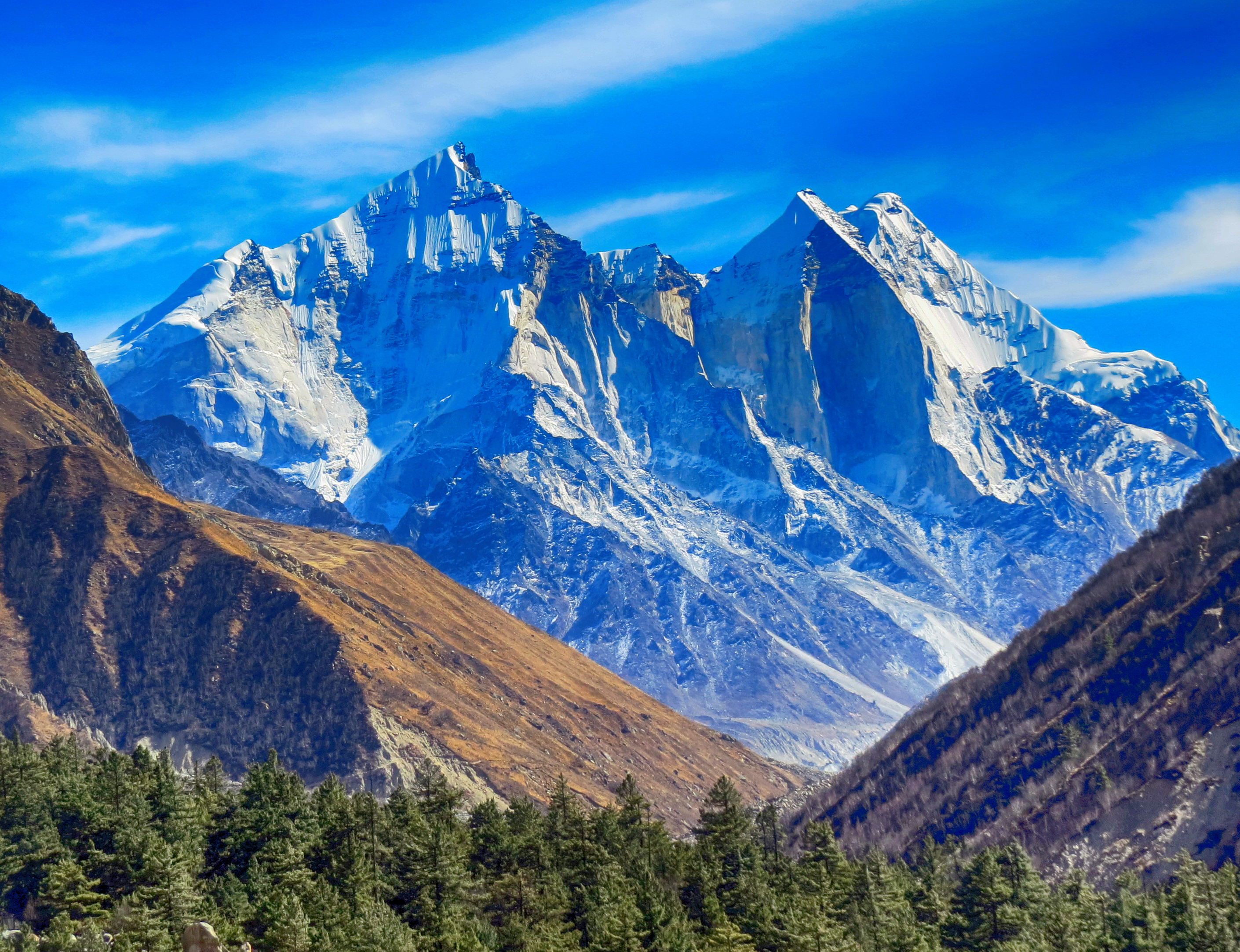
Bhagirathi Massif from Chirvasa. Left to right: Bhagirathi II; Bhagirathi IV; Bhagirathi III and Bhagirathi I.

== Etymology ==
The mountain is named after Bhagiratha, the legendary king of the Ikshvaku dynasty who brought the River Ganges, to Earth from the heavens. To commemorate his efforts, the mainstream that comes out of Gangotri Glacier snout "Gomukh" is called Bhagirathi, till it meets Alaknanda River at Devprayag where the name changes to Ganga.

== Geography ==
The Bhagirathi massif contains four prominent peaks over 6,193 m (20,320 ft) elevation:

Mountain	Elevation	Rank	Prominence	Coordinate
Bhagirathi I	6,856 m (22,493 ft)	393rd	672 m	30°51′00″N 79°08′57″E
Bhagirathi II	6,512 m (21,365 ft)		517 m	30°52′55″N 79°08′01″E
Bhagirathi III	6,454 m (21,175 ft)		351 m	30°52′09″N 79°08′01″E
Bhagirathi IV	6,193 m (20,317 ft)			30°52′35″N 79°07′59″E

== Neighboring peaks ==
Bhagirathi Massif neighboring peaks:

- Satopanth, 7,075m (23,212 ft), 30°50′42″N 79°12′45″E
- Vasuki Parbat, 6,792m (22,283 ft), 30°52′30″N 79°10′30″E
- Shivling, 6,543 m (21467 ft), 30°52′49.48″N 79°03′48.49″E

== Glaciers and rivers ==
The Gangotri Glacier on the west side and Vasuki Glacier on the east side northern side are surrounded by Chaturangi Glacier and southern side guarded by Swachhhand Glacier. From the snout of Gangotri Glacier emerges Bhagirathi river also called Ganga or Ganges after it meets Alaknanda at Devpryag.

== Gallery ==
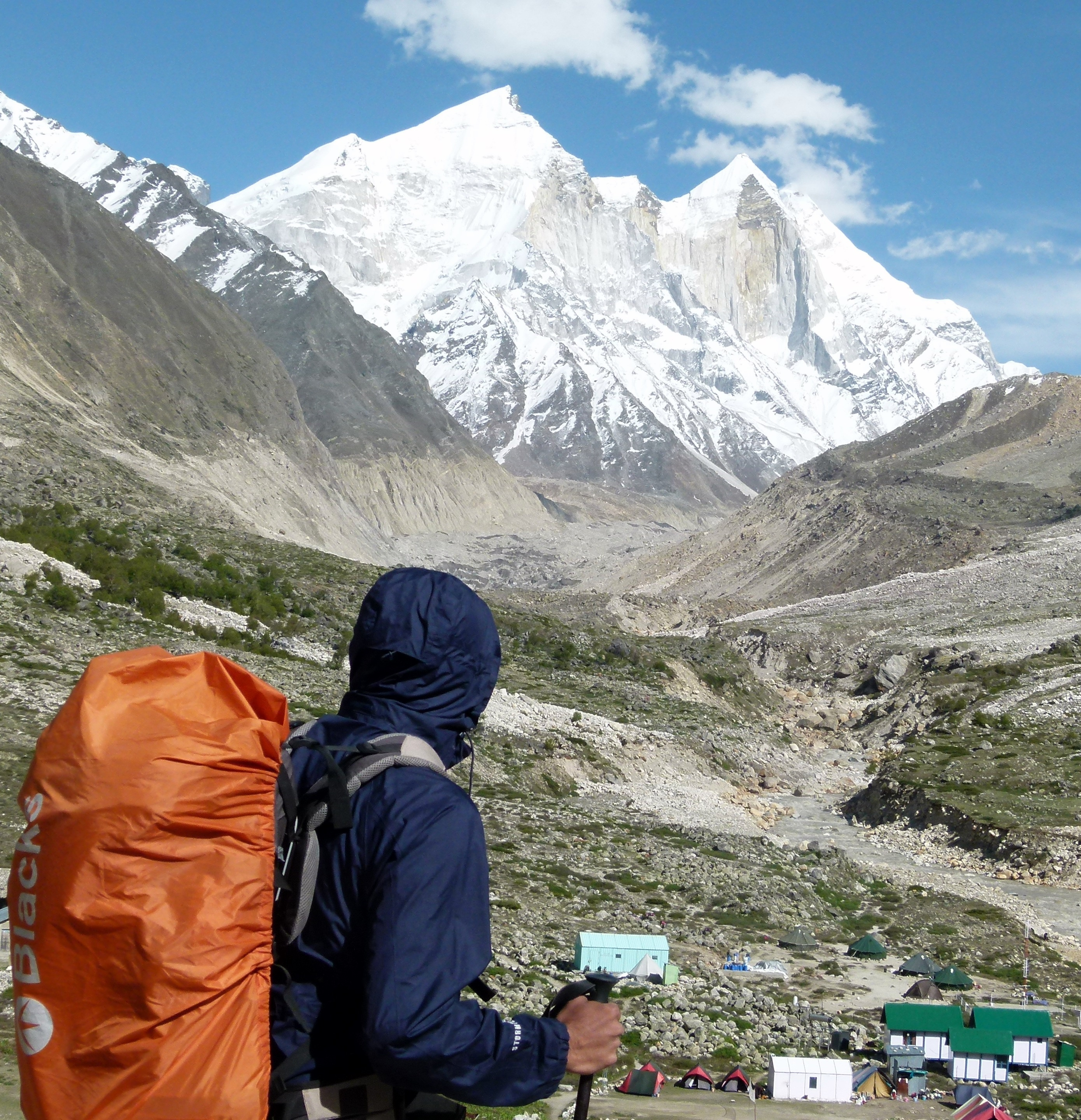
Bhagirathi Massif from Bhojwasa

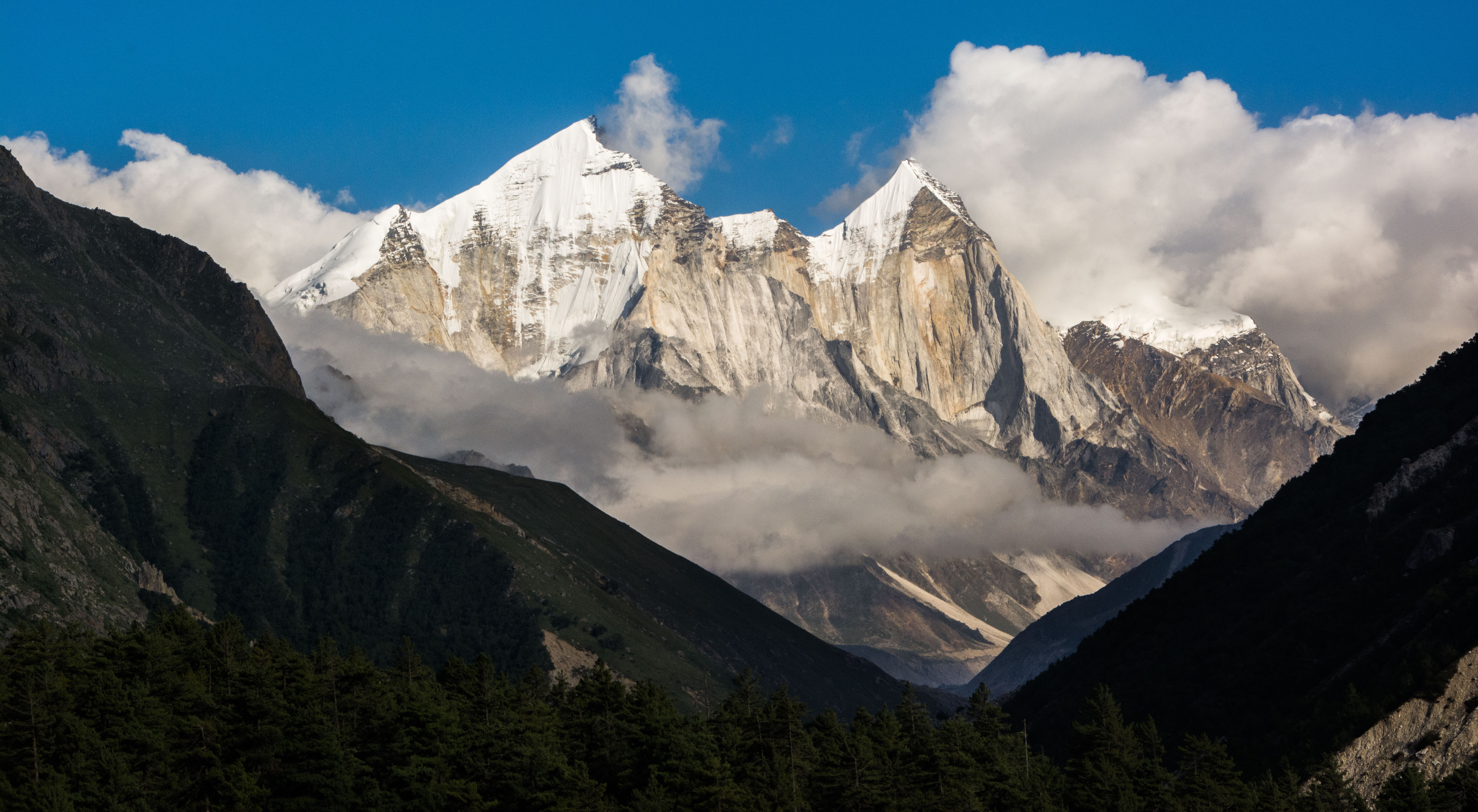
Bhagirathi Massif

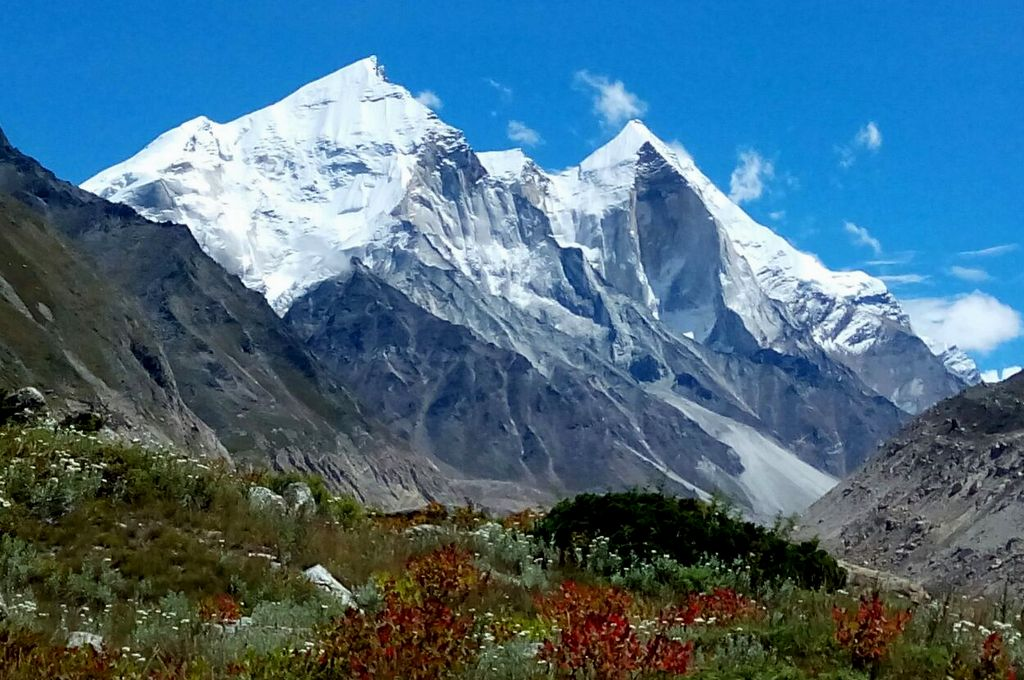
Bhagirathi Massif

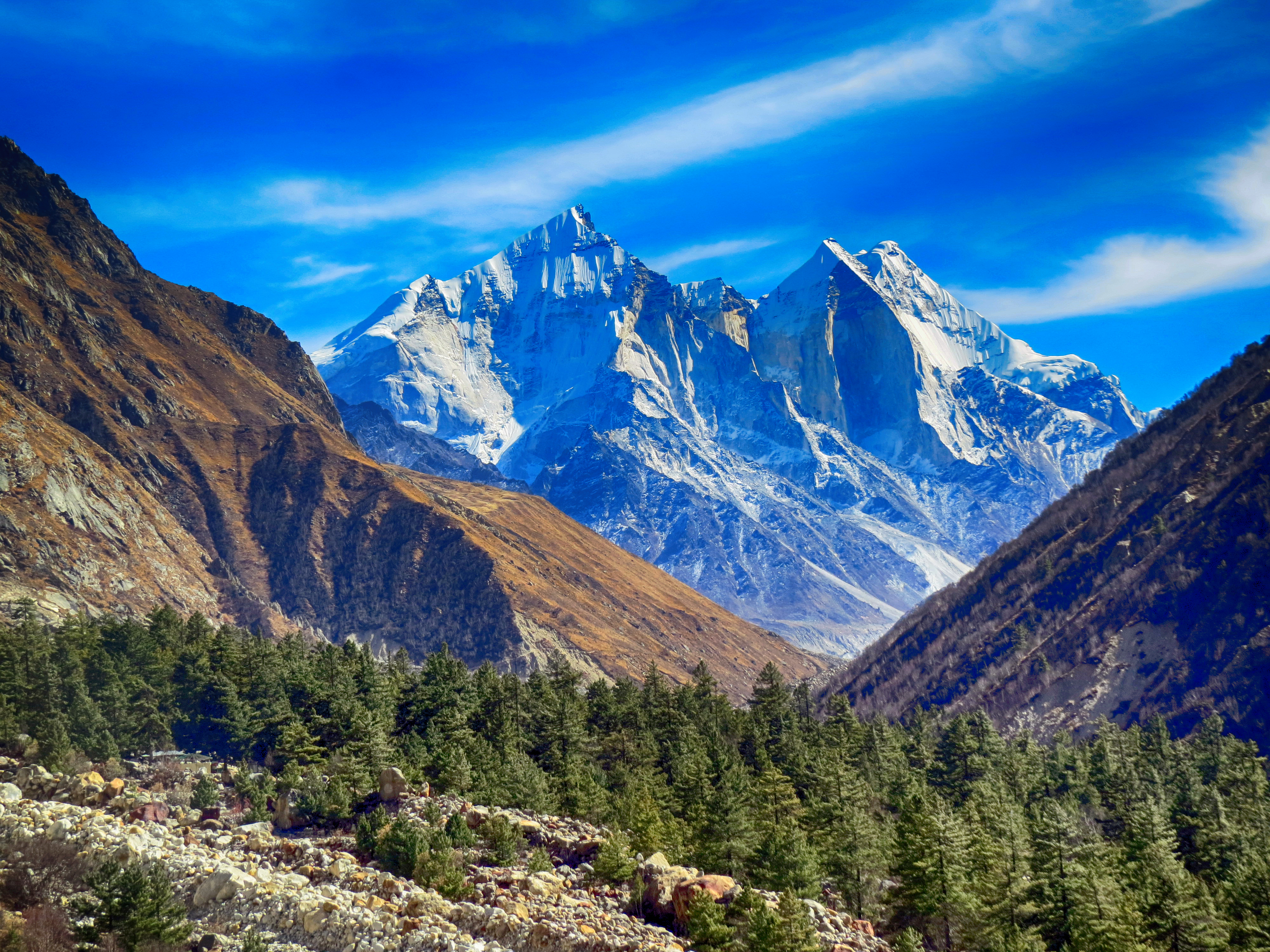
Bhagirathi Massif from Chirvasa

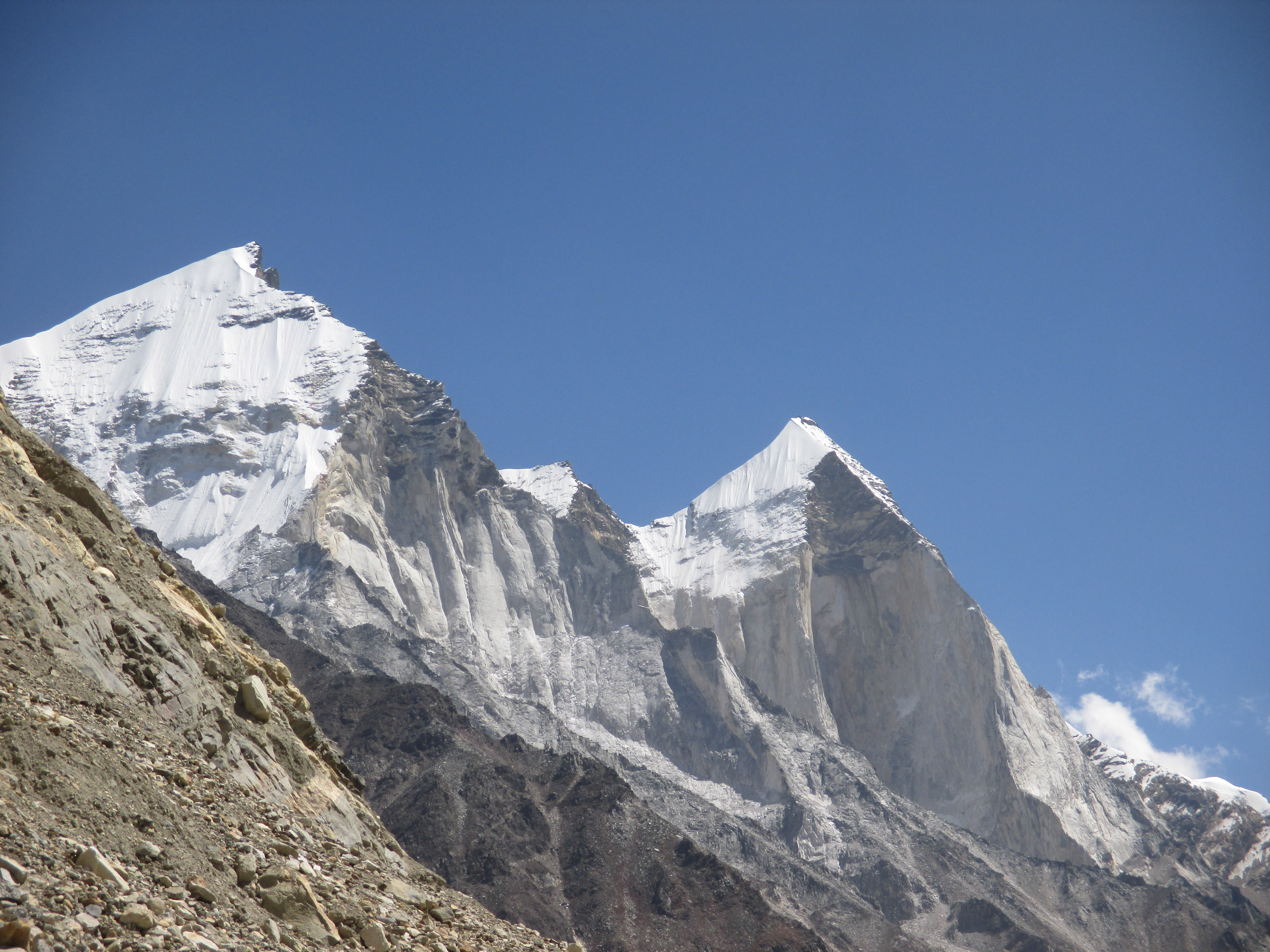
Bhagirathi II and III (L-R)

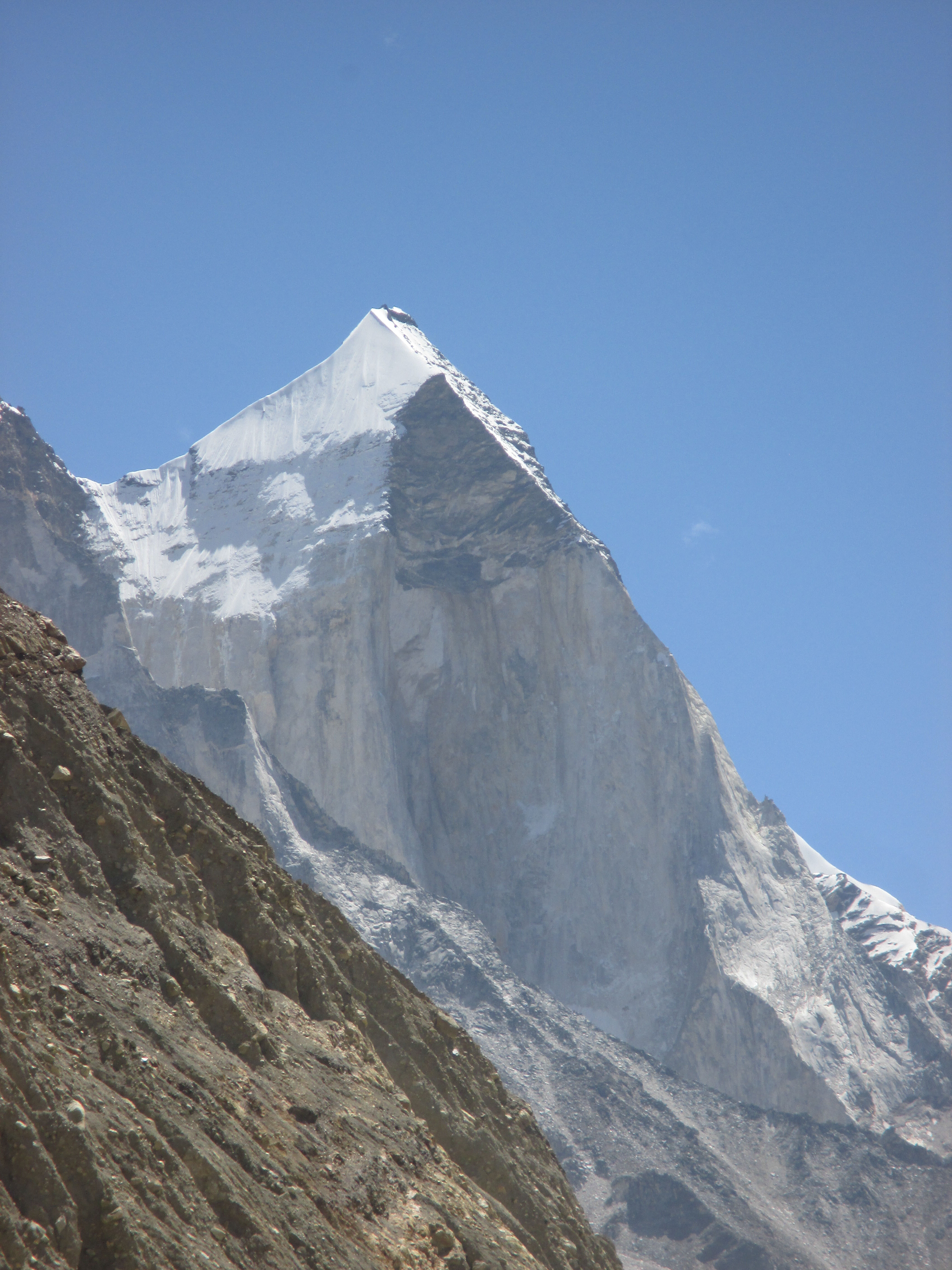
Bhagirathi III

== See also ==
- List of Himalayan peaks of Uttarakhand
- Bhagiratha
- Gangotri National Park
