= Debabrata Mukherjee =

Debabrata Mukherjee may refer to:

- Debabrata Mukherjee (cricketer) (born 1945), Indian cricketer
- Debabrata Mukherjee (mountaineer), Indian mountain climber

== See also ==
- Deb Mukherjee, Indian actor
