= Tapovana =

Spiritual retreat practice in India

Coordinates: 30°54′37″N 79°04′50″E

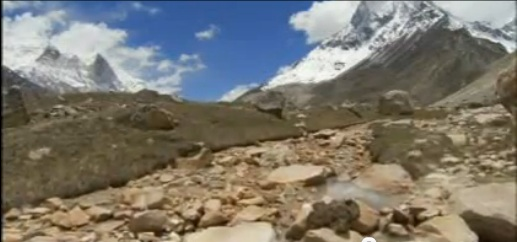
Origin of the holy river Ganga

Tapovana (Sanskrit) comes from the two root words tapas, meaning 'penance' and by extension 'religious mortification' and 'austerity', and more generally 'spiritual practice', and vana, meaning 'forest' or 'thicket'. Tapovana then translates as 'forest of austerities or spiritual practice'. Though pronounced the same in Hindi, tapovana should not be confused with tapovan (from tapovat), which means a person engaged in austerity.

Traditionally in India, any place where someone has engaged in serious spiritual retreat may become known as a tapovana, even if there is no forest. As well as particular caves and other hermitages where sages and sadhus have dwelt, there are some places, such as the western bank of the northern Ganges river around Rishikesh, that have been so used by hermits that the whole area has become known as a tapovana.

== Tapovan (places) ==
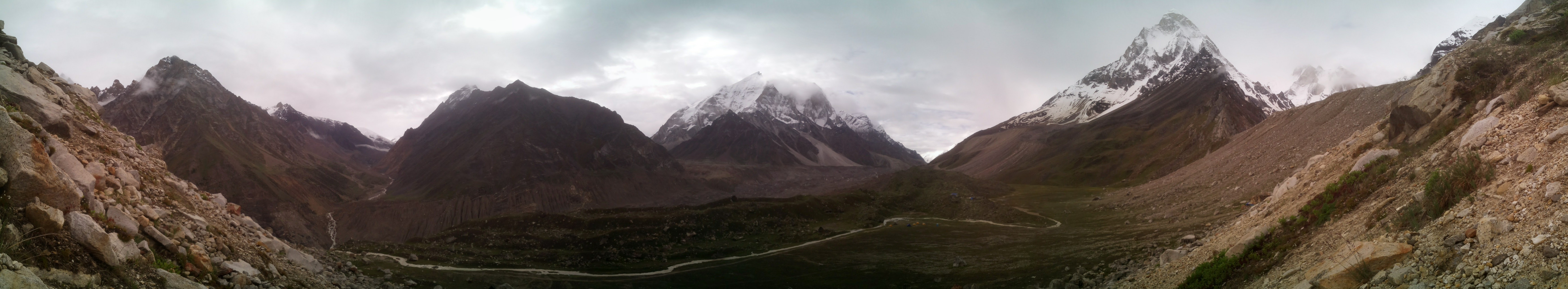
Tapovan from 100 metres above. Alt. 4478 metre ASL.

The most well known tapovan in India is the area above the Gangotri Glacier at one of the primary sources of the Ganges, in Uttarakhand, India. At the foot of Shivling peak, a barren area at about 4,463m (14640 feet) elevation, is a seasonal home to several sadhus living in caves, huts, etc. and it has become a trekking destination also. The trekking usually starts from Gomukh and the trek was considered moderate to difficult prior to the destruction of much of the trail from Gangotri to Gaumukh by the 2013 North Indian Floods. The Tapovan area is base camp for several mountaineering expeditions including Shivling peak, Bhagirathi peak etc. The Tapovan area is full of meadows, streams and flowering plants and the meadows are considered one of the best high altitude meadows in India. In Tapovan, a stream named Amrit Ganga – the nectar of the Ganges – flows into the glacier. There is also a place named Nandanvan near Tapovan, and Nandanvan is also trekked by trekkers and pilgrims. Nandanvan is also a spacious meadow located at the base of Bhagirathi massif.

There is a place bearing a similar name at Joshimath in Chamoli District, which has a sulphur spring known as the Tapovan Hot Springs. It is a part of the Sapta Badri Tapovan PDF.

== See also ==
- Tapovan Vishnugad Hydropower Plant
- Tapovan Express
- Tapovan Maharaj
- Lata Tapovan
