= Debabrata Mukherjee (mountaineer) =

Indian mountain climber

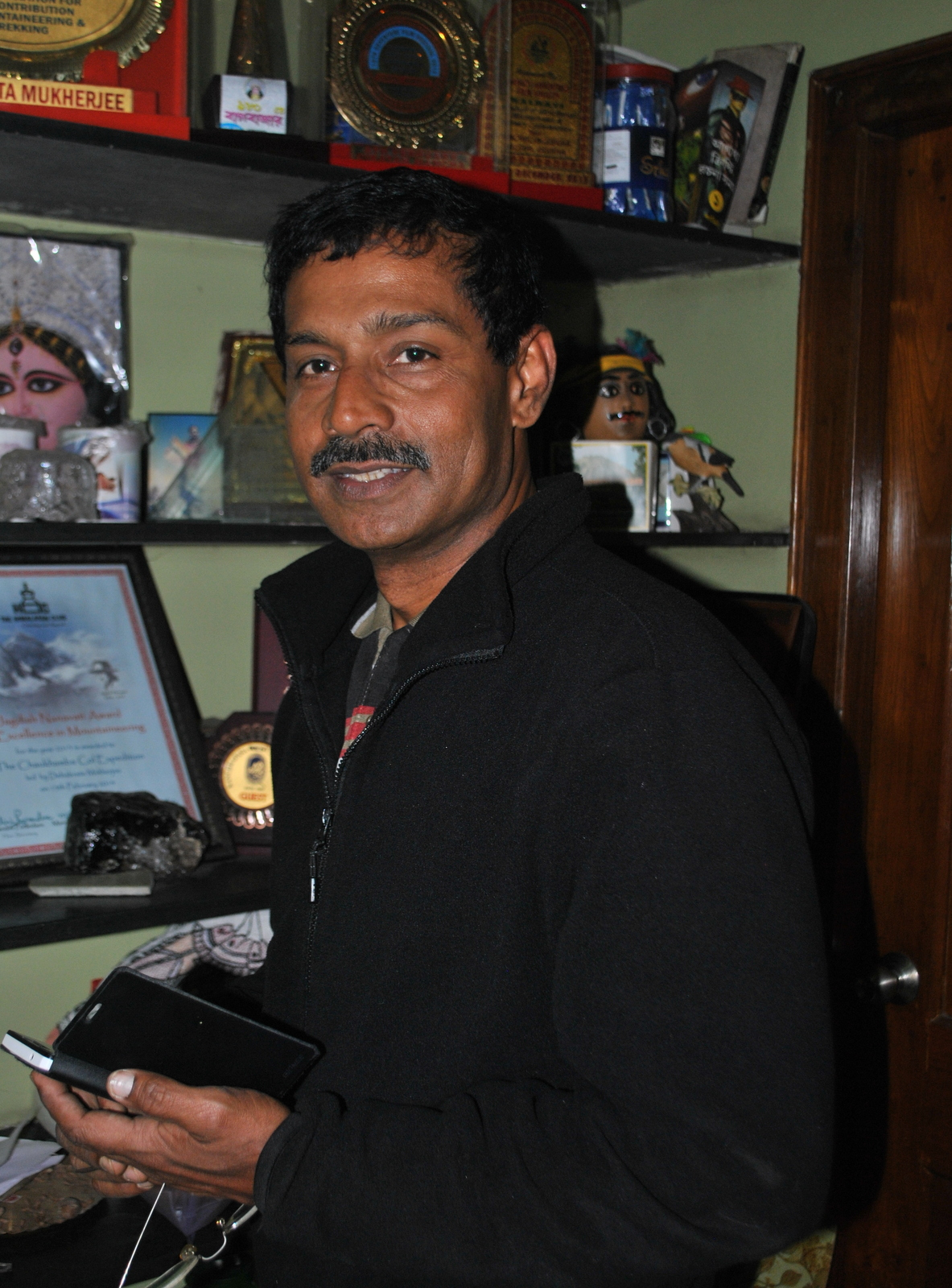
- Debabrata Mukherjee
- Born: 20 January 1962 (age 64); Halisahar, 24 Pargana(north), West Bengal.
- Citizenship: Indian
- Occupation: Tourist Guide
- Known for: First civilian Indian Bengali to climb Mount Everest from the North Col
- Spouse: Dr.Bipasha Mukherjee(Majumdar)

Debabrata Mukherjee (born 20 January 1962) is an Indian mountaineer and explorer from West Bengal. He was the oldest, first civilian Indian to climb Mount Everest from the North Col. He is also the first person to cross Chaukhamba Col from Badrinath to reach Gangotri.

== Climbing career ==
=== Mount Everest ===
Debabrata Mukherjee climbed the North-Col and NE Ridge with Biplob Vaidya on 25 May 2014 and set foot on the summit of Mount Everest at 8:46 am. He was the team leader of this expedition. The same day Malavath Purna the youngest Indian and the youngest female in the world to have reached the summit of Mount Everest.

=== Mountaineering expeditions ===
Mukherjee climbed Mt.Saife in 1986

Kamet 1988

Mount Yunam in 2005 as a Team leader and successful climber

Uja Tirche in 2005 as a Team leader and successful climber (new route)

Mount Karcha as a Team leader and successful climber 2008

Mount K. R. V East Face as a Team leader 2013

Mount Everest Oldest person to climb successfully from North-Col in 2014

Mount Jalung Ri and Mount Chomo Ri (First ascent) as a Liaison Officer with a Japanese team and a successful climber 2015

Bhagirathi Parbat III as a Team leader and successful climber first Indian ascent from North ridge Indian Mountaineering Foundation - Pathayatra 2015

Mount Blanc oldest Indian to climbed the peak Successfully in 2016.

=== Wider explorations ===
The first person to cross the Panpatia Glacier in 2006. In 2009 he found a new trekking route from Kedarnath to Badrinath. To find this path, he crossed the Gandharpangi forest, Panpatia, and Satopanth glaciers. In 2013 On the way from Badrinath to Gangotri, he crossed the Chaukhamba col with a new route.

== Bibliography and travel stories ==
- Natur i Sydasien (In Swedish)

== Awards ==
- Jagadish Nanavati Award from Himalayan Club (2013)

== Gallery ==
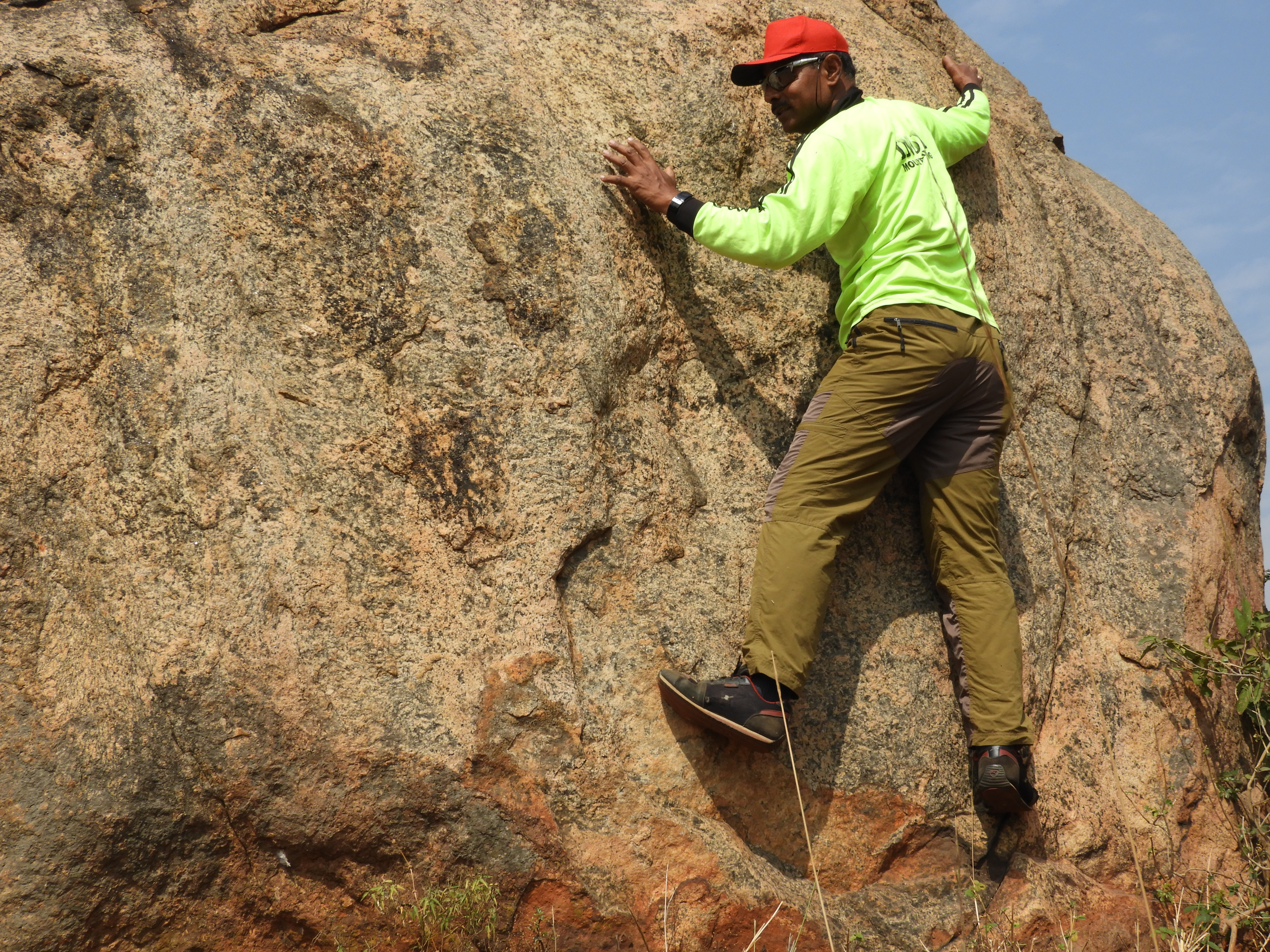
Giving demonstration at Tilabuni West Bengal

== See also ==
- Indian summiters of Mount Everest - Year wise
- List of Mount Everest summiters by number of times to the summit
- List of Mount Everest records of India
- List of Mount Everest records
