= Christoph Hainz =

Italian mountaineer (born 1962)

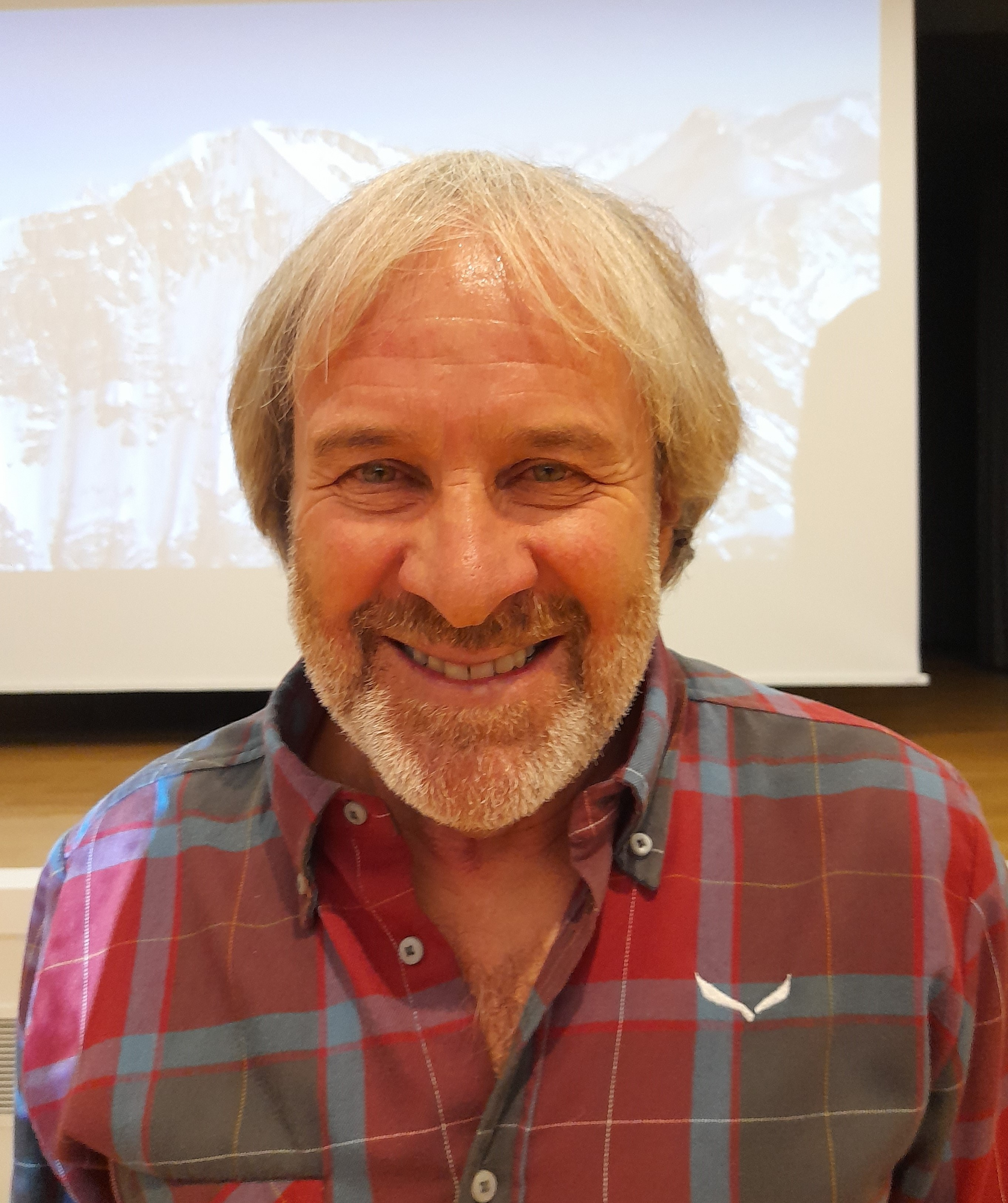
- Hainz in 2024

Personal information
- Born: 23 July 1962 (age 64) Mühlbach, South Tyrol, Italy
- Website: christoph-hainz.com/en

Climbing career
- First ascents: Shivling North pillar with Hans Kammerlander (VII/WI4); "Mutschlechner – Grossrubatscher–Gedächtnisweg" Kreuzkofel (IX-); "Geierwally" Geierwand/Höhlensteintal (VIII); "Hexenbeisser" Hoher Zwölfer, Sextener (VIII A2); "Ride with the camel" Jebel Rum/Jordania (VIII); "Das Phantom der Zinne" Große Zinne-North face (IX+); "Alpenliebe" Westliche Zinne-North face (IX); "Ötzi trifft Yeti" Kleine Zinne (VIII+); Mixedroute "Pustertaler Halbgefrorenes" Rein in Taufers (VIII-/WI6/M4); "Beer drinking" Prags, South Tyrol (WI5/M9); "Rondo Veneziano" Torre Venezia Civetta South face (IX-); "Ei des Kolumbus" Marmolada South face (VII/A3); "Moulin Rouge" Rotwand/Rosengarten with Partner Oswald Celva (IX-); "Donnafugata" Torre Trieste (7a, A2 bzw. 8a); "Kein Rest von Sehnsucht" Civetta NW face(VIII-); "Zombi" Cima del Lago Fanis (VII+); "Misch ich fix", Höhlensteintal (M10+)
- Known for: Free solo ascent of Eiger North face via Heckmair-Route in 4.5 hours

Christoph Hainz (born 23 July 1962) is an Italian climber, mountaineering allrounder, professional mountain guide and author from the German-speaking province of South Tyrol. Hainz has made over 2000 mountain tours, climbing routes up to grade X/X+, ice climbing and mixed routes up to grade M13 and numerous alpine routes up until grade 10. In the Dolomites alone he opened about 40 first ascents up to difficulty level X. His special achievements include the fastest solo ascent of Fitz Roy in Patagonia in 9 hours and the first ascent of Shivling North Pillar together with Hans Kammerlander in India in 1993. In 1997, he climbed the Superdirettissima in the north face of the Grosse Zinne alone in 8 hours.

== Early life and education ==
Hainz was born in Mühlbach, South Tyrol. He grew up with his uncle and aunt on a farm at 1500m above sea level. After finishing school he became a car mechanic. He started climbing at age 20, because he did not have any free time before.

== Career ==
It was not until 1990, that he became a certified mountain guide and skiing instructor and ski mountaineering guide. Since 1998 he has been a member of the instructing team of the South Tyrolean mountain and ski guides. In 1999 he became a sports climbing and canyoning teacher.

His special achievements include the fastest solo ascent of Fitz Roy in Patagonia in 9 hours and in 1993 the first ascent of Shivling North Pillar in Indiatogether with Hans Kammerlander. In 1997, he climbed the Superdirettissimain the north face of the Grosse Zinne alone in 8 hours. As a sport climber he has been in numerous countries such as Australia, the US, South America, Canada, Switzerland, France, Spain, Italy, Jordan, Morocco, South Africa, Austria and Slovenia.

In 2007, he opened a new route in the Eiger Northface together with Roger Schäli which they named Magic Mushroom, with 21 rope lengths, 600 climbing meters at rating 7c.

In the Dolomites alone, Hainz opened about 40 first ascents up to difficulty level X. He won seven consecutive national and international mountain guide championships. In 2008, Reinhold Messner described him as an alpinist of a never-before-seen kind.

In the summer of 2014 he climbed the Comici route of the Grosse Zinne Northface in only 48 minutes.

Because of his special relationship to the Drei Zinnen he has been nicknamed "the Zinnenmann", also the name of a documentary.

In 2016, servusTV filmed him and Axel Naglich ski climb the Ortler and ski down the Minnigerode channel, a 50 degree piste, while Speedriding pilots Armin and Guido Senoner flew along.

In 2018 and 2019, he led German president Frank-Walter Steinmeier and Lukas Meindl onto various peaks like Schwarzenstein (3365 meter) and Floitenspitz.

== Personal life ==
Hainz was married from 1995 to 2011 and lived in Reischach (Riscone), near Brixen South Tyrol. He has a daughter. Since 2011, he has been living in Nasen, South Tyrol. He lost his son Jonas in a climbing accident on 29 October 2022.

== See also ==
- List of climbers
