= Martin Moran (climber) =

British mountain climber (1955–2019)

Personal information
- Nationality: British
- Born: 19 February 1955
- Died: 26 May 2019 (aged 64) Sunanda Devi, India
- Spouse: Joy Moran
- Children: Hazel; Alex

Climbing career
- Major ascents: The Munros in winter; Alps 4000; Nanda Kot, S-face; Nilkanth, W-ridge

Martin Moran (19 February 1955 – 26 May 2019) was a British climber, mountain guide and author. In 1985, he became the first person to climb all the Munros (mountains in Scotland over 3000 ft (914.4m) in height) during a single winter excursion. In 1993, he and his climbing partner became the first people to make a continuous traverse of all the Alpine 4,000-metre mountains in a single continuous trip, and without using any form of motorised transport. He created over a hundred new winter climbing routes in Scotland, and made a number of first ascents in the Himalayas. Moran died whilst leading a mountaineering expedition in India.

== Early life ==
Born on 19 February 1955, Moran spent his childhood on Tyneside. There he met his future wife, Joy, when both were 18 years old. Moran studied geography at Cambridge University and subsequently qualified as a chartered accountant, basing himself in Sheffield.

In 1985, Moran and his partner moved to Scotland and established a mountaineering instruction and guiding business, 'Moran Mountain' based in Lochcarron. For the next twenty years they ran summer alpine mountaineering courses, based out of Argentière in France, and Evolène in Switzerland. Their children, Hazel and Alex, subsequently assisted in running the guiding business.

== Achievements ==
During the winter season of 1984/85, Moran became the first person to climb all the Scottish mountains listed as 'Munros' in one single trip during winter. The 277 peaks that were listed at the time are all over 3,000 feet in height, and were climbed over 83 days. He was supported along the route by his wife Joy. He subsequently published a book which described the undertaking.

In 1985, Moran qualified as a professional mountain guide.

In summer 1993, Moran and his climbing partner Simon Jenkins climbed all 75 summits of the Alps that were then listed as being over 4,000 metres (13,000 ft) in height. They did this in one continuous journey, travelling on foot or by bicycle to get between mountain ranges, but without using any motorised transport. Again, Moran published a book recounting this challenging journey. (Note: There was no officially approved listing of summits at that time. The UIAA published an official list of 82 summits later that year.)

As a climber and runner, Moran made numerous traverses of the 7.5 miles (12.1 km)-long Cuillin Ridge on the Isle of Skye. This mountaineering undertaking normally takes a full day of climbing and scrambling but, in 1993, Moran set a new record of completing the traverse in 3 hours and 33 minutes. He is reported to have attempted this challenge around twenty times, failing it as many times as he succeeded.

In 2010, Moran made the first British ascent of Vettisfossen, Norway’s highest waterfall.

In March 2016, Moran made a full winter solo-traverse of the Cuillin ridge in under 24 hours.

By 2016, Moran had made the first ascents of 14 summits within the Indian Himalayas, including the 1995 ascent of the south face of Nanda Kot (6,861 metres (22,510 ft)) and the first ascent in 2000 of the west ridge of Nilkanth (6,596 metres (21,640 ft)). Moran also led mountaineering trips to Kamet and Trisul, and to summits in the Uttarakhand region.

=== Selected first ascents ===
==== Scotland ====
As a winter climber, Moran set up over a hundred new routes in Scotland.

His 2002 route, The Godfather (Grade VIII, 8) on Beinn Bhàn, is regarded as a "sought-after test-piece" and a "winter prize".

- Sgùrr Bàn, North-East Face: Scarred for Life 85m VIII,9 ***. Martin Moran, Robin Thomas. 5 Feb 2019
- Beinn Eighe: Blood, Sweat and Frozen Tears (VII,8) 1993
- Am Basteir First winter ascent of Hung, Drawn and Quartered (VIII,8) on north face. 1989

==== Himalayas ====
- Nilkanth (6,596 metres (21,640 ft)) May–June 2000 First ascent of West ridge.
- NandaGhunti (6,390 metres (20,960 ft)) 2001 New route on S-face.
- Unnamed peak, Garhwal (5,850 metres (19,190 ft)) May 2002
- Little Kailash (6,321 metres (20,738 ft)) September 2002
- Chiring We (6,599 metres (21,650 ft)) September 2004. first British ascent led by Martin Moran.
- Adi Kailash, Kumaun (6,150 metres (20,180 ft)) September 2006 British ascent of the NE ridge, led by Martin Moran
- Gangstang, Lahul/Spiti (6,162 metres (20,217 ft)) September 2007. New route on the West Face.
- Changuch, Kumaon Himalaya (6,322 metres (20,741 ft)) June 2009 First ascent. Party led by Martin Moran
- Cheepaydang (Peacock Peak), Kumaun (6,220 metres (20,410 ft)) 2014 First ascent . Party led by Martin Moran

== Publications ==
- The Munros in Winter (1986).
- Scotland's Winter Mountains: The Challenge and the Skills (1988). David & Charles. ISBN 9780715390962
- Alps 4000 (1994).
- The 4000m peaks of the Alps: Selected Climbs (2007).
- Higher Ground (2014).ISBN 9781908737557
- (with I. R. White) The High Alps: An Interactive Guide to the 4000m Peaks (2004). ISYS Outdoors (CDROM)

== Death ==
In May 2019, Moran was guiding an expedition in India to climb Nanda Devi East (7,681 metres (25,200 ft)). Having trekked in to Nanda Devi East base camp on 18 May, they established a higher base camp at 4,870 metres (15,980 ft) three days later. The party of twelve climbers then split; one group to fix ropes to the main route on Nanda Devi East, whilst Moran's party of eight attempted an acclimatisation climb and first ascent of an unnamed, subsidiary peak at 6,477 metres (21,250 ft). On 25 May, Moran confirmed that a camp had been established around 5,400 metres (17,700 ft) and his party would set off for the summit the next morning. All contact was subsequently lost with Moran's group, and a search by the other party failed to find them, but noted evidence of a large avalanche on their route. The alarm was raised on 31 May.

Seven bodies from the group of eight were subsequently recovered in June, but a further search was called off because of monsoon conditions. On 8 July, a GoPro camera, found close to where one of the bodies was retrieved, revealed some of the last movements of the party on 26 May as they traversed a delicate snow ridge, which is believed to have collapsed beneath them, triggering an avalanche which killed them. On the same day, British Mountain Guides Association announced that Martin Moran's body is still missing.
