= Colin Kirkus =

British rock climber (1910–1942)

Personal information
- Nationality: British
- Born: 18 September 1910 Liverpool
- Died: 14 September 1942 (aged 31)
- Relative: Wilfrid Noyce (cousin)

Climbing career
- Type of climber: Outdoors, post-golden age
- Named routes: Clogwyn Du'r Arddu, Snowdonia, Wales (Great Slab 1930, Chimney Route 1931)
- Known for: Book: 'Let's Go Climbing'

Colin Fletcher Kirkus (18 September 1910 – 14 September 1942 was a British rock climber. He climbed extensively in Wales and elsewhere, such as the Alps and the Himalaya. He wrote the instruction book Let's Go Climbing! which inspired Joe Brown to take up the sport.

== Early life ==
Kirkus was born in Liverpool, England on 18 September 1910.

Kirkus was a cousin of Wilfrid Noyce, seven years older than Noyce, Colin developed an active interest in climbing during his early teens and the families of Kirkus and Noyce shared holidays in the Welsh hills. It was Kirkus who first introduced Noyce to rock climbing.

== Climbing ==
Kirkus made pioneering climbs in Wales and elsewhere and wrote the instruction book Let's Go Climbing!.

Jack Longland described the greatest rock face in Wales, Clogwyn Du'r Arddu, as "Colin’s Cliff".

Kirkus' series of new routes on "Cloggy" was unparalleled until the emergence of Joe Brown, 20 years later.

In 1933 Kirkus was a member of Marco Pallis's 5 man expedition (Marco Pallis, Ted Hicks, Dr Charles Warren, Colin Kirkus, Richard Nicholson) to the Gangotri area of the Himalaya and the team climbed several peaks. During the expedition Kirkus and Charles Warren made a pioneering alpine-style ascent of the central or 'second Satopanth peak' which is now known as the 6,454 metres (21,175 ft) Bhagirathi III. Kirkus' account of the climb is included in Pallis's book Peaks and Lamas. That ascent has been described as "amongst the most important ascents by British climbers in that decade".

== Death ==
Kirkus was killed in the Second World War, on a sortie to Bremen on the night of 13/14 September 1942. He was a navigator on Vickers Wellington BJ879 of 156 Squadron an RAF Pathfinder squadron. He was one of four brothers, all of whom saw flying service in the RAF, and three of whom were killed in action in the Second World War.

His name is listed on the Runnymede Memorial for airmen with no known grave.

== Bibliography ==
- Dean, Steve (September 1993). Hands of a Climber. ISBN 0-948153-21-0.
- Thomson, I.D.S. (1993). The Black Cloud. ISBN 0-948153-20-2.
