= Bhagirathi Parbat III =

Mountain in Uttarakhand, India

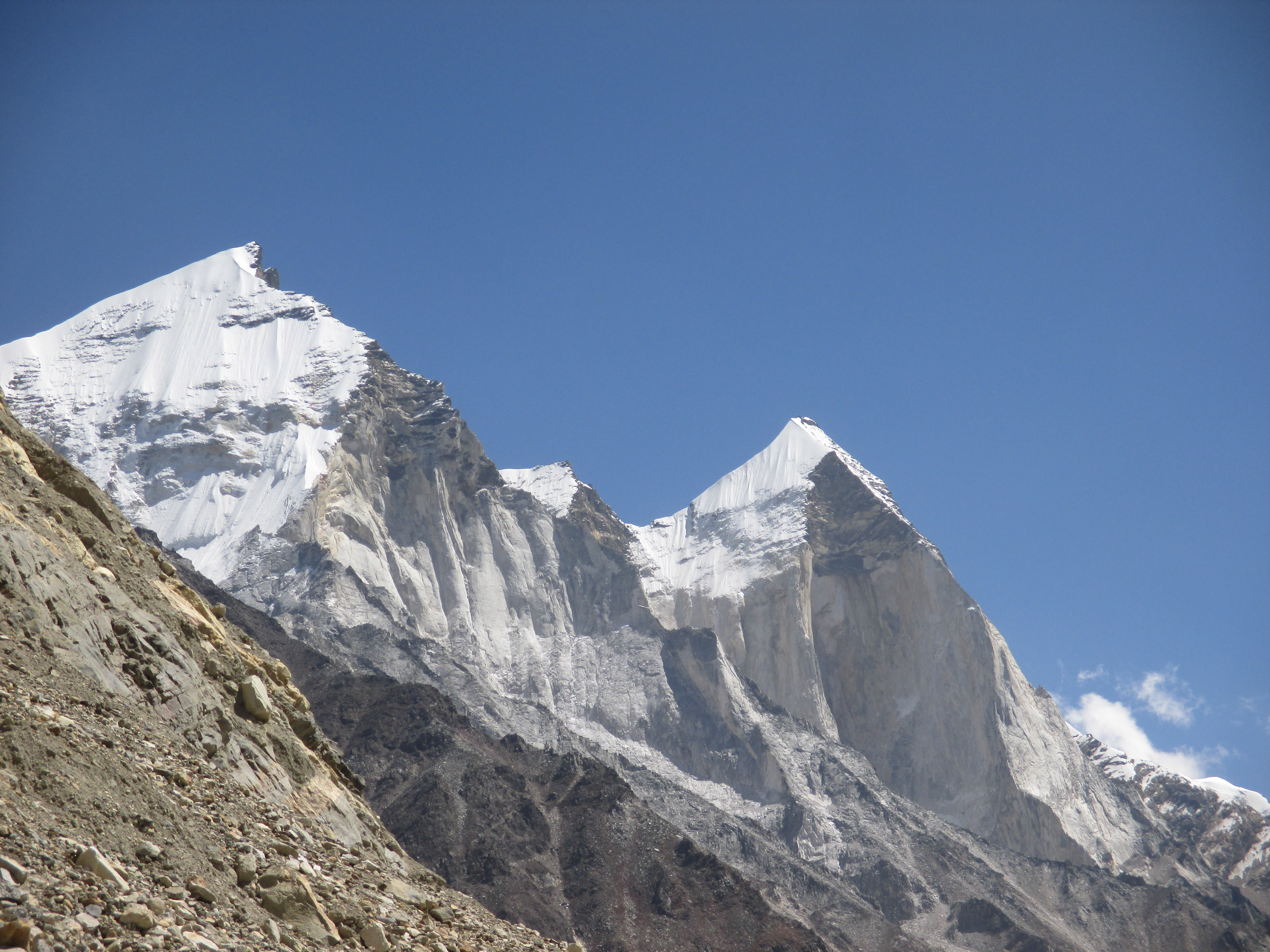
- Bhagirathi II and III from left to right

Highest point
- Elevation: 6,454 m (21,175 ft)
- Prominence: 517 m (1,696 ft)
- Listing: Mountains of Uttarakhand
- Coordinates: 30°52′55″N 79°08′01″E

Geography
- Location within Uttarakhand Location within India
- Country: India
- State: Uttarakhand
- Parent range: Garhwal Himalaya

Climbing
- First ascent: 1933 by Colin Kirkus and Charles Warren

Bhagirathi Parbat III (Hindi: भागीरथी पर्वत III) is a mountain in Uttarakhand, India. It is the 95th highest peak located entirely within Uttarakhand, India. (The highest in this category is Nanda Devi.) The summit is 6,454 metres (21,175 ft). It is the third highest peak of the Bhagirathi Massif. It was first climbed by Britishers Colin Kirkus and Dr. Charles Warren in 1933, by way of the southeast ridge.

== Climbing history ==
In 1933 the English climbers Colin Kirkus and Charles Warren made the first ascent of 'the central or second Satopanth peak' which is now known as Bhagirathi III. Kirkus' account of the climb is included in the book Peaks and Lamas. Their ascent was made in a pioneering alpine-style and has been described as "amongst the most important ascents by British climbers in that decade".

The first successful ascent by an Indian was on 20 October 1966. Janez Jeglic and Silvo Karo climbed the overhanging west face On 7 September 1990.

On 15 September 2015 Debabrata Mukherjee and his team successfully summited Bhagirathi III via the north ridge.

== Neighboring and subsidiary peaks ==
The following are neighboring or subsidiary peaks:

- Bhagirathi Parbat I, 6,856 metres (22,493 ft) 30°51′00″N 79°08′57″E
- Bhagirathi Parbat II, 6,512 metres (21,365 ft) 30°52′55″N 79°08′01″E
- Satopanth, 7,075 metres (23,212 ft), 30°50′42″N 79°12′45″E
- Vasuki Parbat, 6,792 metres (22,283 ft), 30°52′30″N 79°10′30″E

== Glaciers and rivers ==
Glaciers associated with the mountain include Gangotri Glacier (east flank), Vasuki Glacier (west flank), and Chaturangi Glacier (north flank). The Bhagirathi river (also called Ganga or Ganges) emerges from the terminus of Gangotri Glacier.
