= Bhagirathi Parbat II =

Second highest peak in Bhagirathi Massif

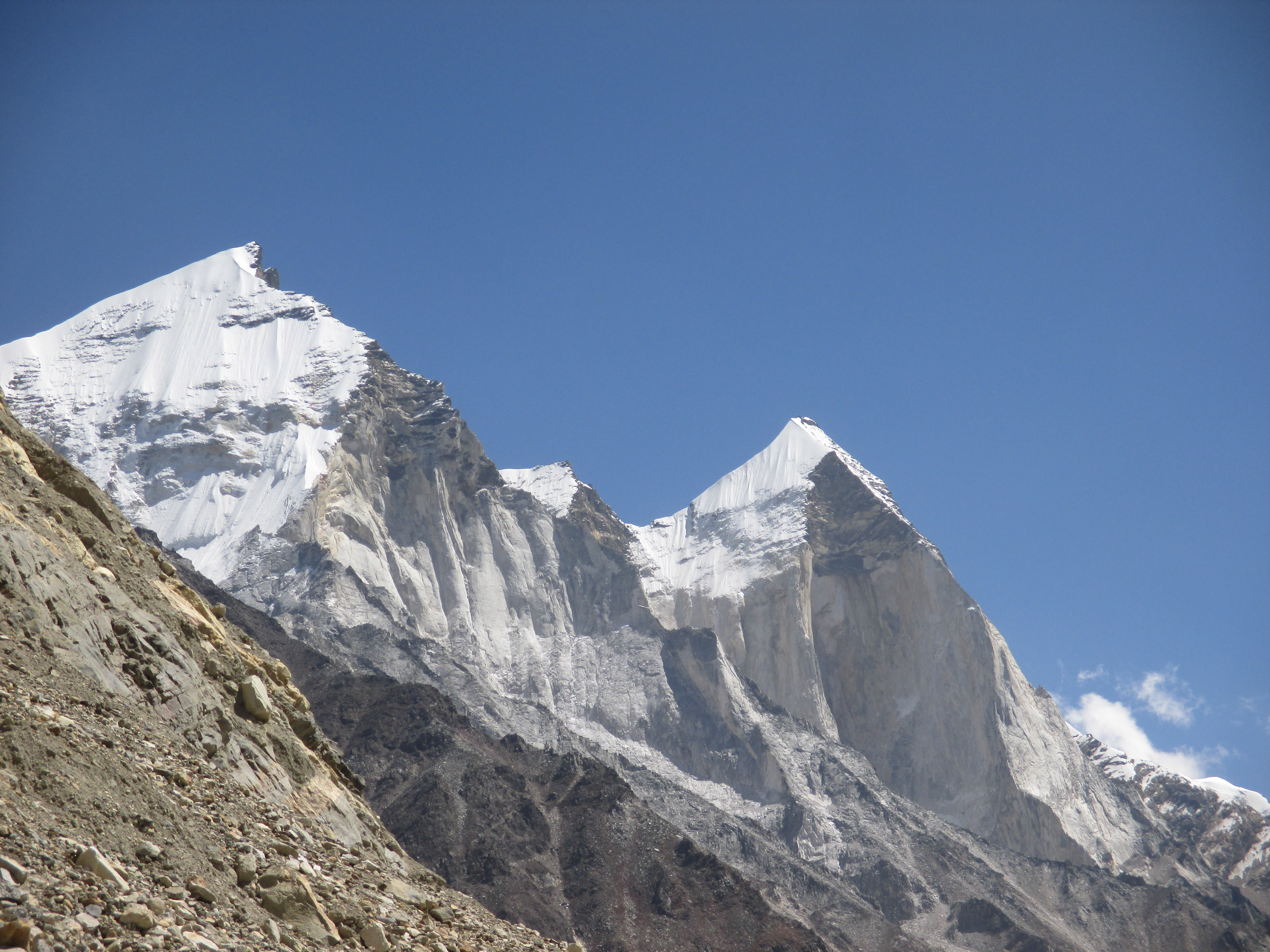
- Bhagirathi II and III from left to right

Highest point
- Elevation: 6,512 m (21,365 ft)
- Prominence: 517 m (1,696 ft)
- Listing: Mountains of Uttarakhand
- Coordinates: 30°53′02″N 79°08′08″E

Geography
- Location within Uttarakhand
- Country: India
- State: Uttarakhand
- Parent range: Garhwal Himalayas

Climbing
- First ascent: Austrians Edi Ellmauthaler and Toni Messner in 1933.

Bhagirathi Parbat II (Hindi: भागीरथी पर्वत II) is a mountain in Uttarakhand India. It's the 85th highest located entirely within the Uttarakhand India. Nanda Devi, is the highest mountain in this category. It is the second highest peak in the Bhagirathi Massif at 6,512 m (21,365 ft). It was first climbed by Austrians Edi Ellmauthaler and Toni Messner in 1933.

== Climbing history ==
The first ascent was in 1933 by Austrians Edi Ellmauthaler and Toni Messner. The first Indian success on this peak came on 20 October 1966. Govinda Raj, Amar Ray, and two Sherpas, Karma and Gyalboo climbed to the summit after a ten hour of difficult climb. while coming back from summit in a freak accident Amar Ray, and two Sherpas Karma and Gyalboo died while Govinda Raj got frostbite.

== Neighboring and subsidiary peaks ==
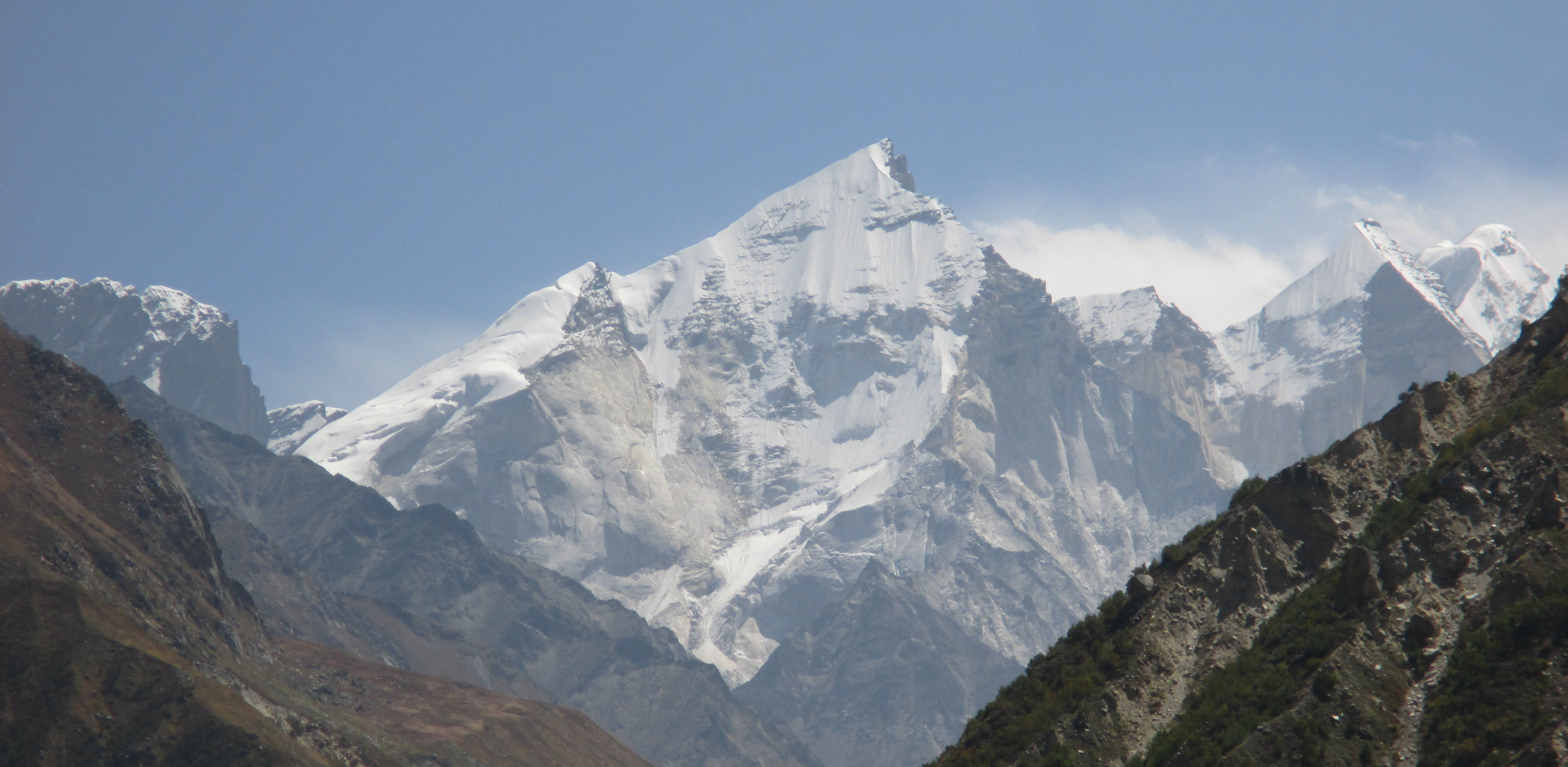

From left to right Vasuki Parbat, Bhagirathi Parbat II, IV, III, I neighboring peaks

Bhagirathi Parbat II neighboring or subsidiary peaks:

- Bhagirathi Parbat I, 6,856 m (22493 ft)30°51′00″N 79°08′57″E
- Satopanth, 7,075m (23,212 ft), 30°50′42″N 79°12′45″E
- Vasuki Parbat, 6,792m (22,283 ft), 30°52′30″N 79°10′30″E
- Bhagirathi Parbat III, 6,454 m (21175 ft)30°52′09″N 79°08′01″E

== Glaciers and rivers ==
The Gangotri Glacier on the east side and Vasuki Glacier on the west side and Chaturangi Glacier on the north. From the snout of Gangotri Glacier emerges Bhagirathi river also called Ganga or Ganges.
