= Bhagirathi Parbat I =

Mountain in Uttarakhand, India

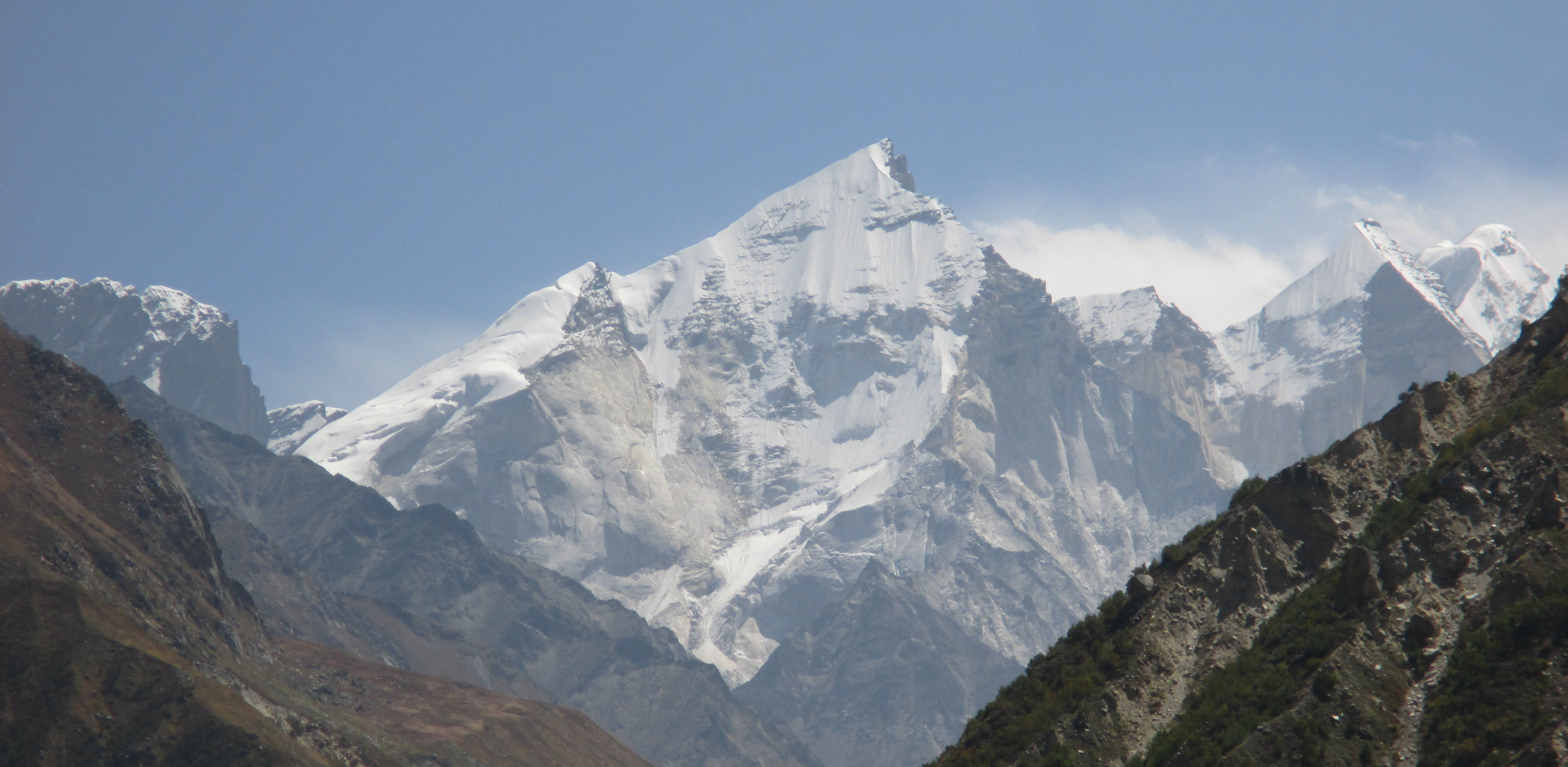
- From left to right Vasuki Parbat, Bhagirathi Parbat II, IV, III, I

Highest point
- Elevation: 6,856 m (22,493 ft)
- Prominence: 672 m (2,205 ft)
- Listing: Mountains of Uttarakhand
- Coordinates: 30°50′59″N 79°08′48″E

Geography
- Location within Uttarakhand
- Country: India
- State: Uttarakhand
- Parent range: Garhwal Himalayas

Climbing
- First ascent: Japanese Expedition in 1980.

Bhagirathi Parbat I (Hindi: भागीरथी पर्वत I) is the highest peak of the Bhagirathi Massif of the Garhwal Himalayas in Uttarakhand, India. It is the 62nd highest peak in India and 393rd highest in the world. The summit is 6,856 metres (22,493 ft) high. It was first climbed by a Japanese team in 1980.

== Climbing history ==
It was first climbed by a Japanese expedition team via its south east ridge in 1980. They used around 2,000 metres (6,600 feet) of rope for fixing and technical climbing. The second climb happened in 1983 by a British team led by Martin Moran and his three friends John Mothersele, Charlie Heard and Kevin Flint via the west ridge. On 21 August, Martin Moran and Charlie Heard reached the summit around 4:30 pm; the next day, on 22 August, Charlie Heard died from a fall while abseiling.

== Neighboring and subsidiary peaks ==
Bhagirathi Parbat I neighboring or subsidiary peaks:

- Satopanth, 7,075 m (23,212 ft), 30°50′42″N 79°12′45″E
- Vasuki Parbat, 6,792 m (22,283 ft), 30°52′30″N 79°10′30″E
- Bhagirathi Parbat III, 6,454 metres (21,175 ft), 30°52′09″N 79°08′01″E
- Swachhand, 6,721 m (22,051 ft), 30°48′34″N 79°13′27″E
- Chaukhamba I, 7,138 m (23,419 ft), 30°52′55″N 79°08′01″E
- Mandani Parbat, 6,193 m (20,318 ft),30°44′01″N 79°11′57″E

== Glaciers and rivers ==
The peak is flanked by the Gangotri Glacier in the west and Vasuki Glacier in the east. From the snout of Gangotri Glacier emerges Bhagirathi river, more commonly known as the Ganga or Ganges.
