= Sunanda Devi =

India's second highest mountain

Nanda Devi East
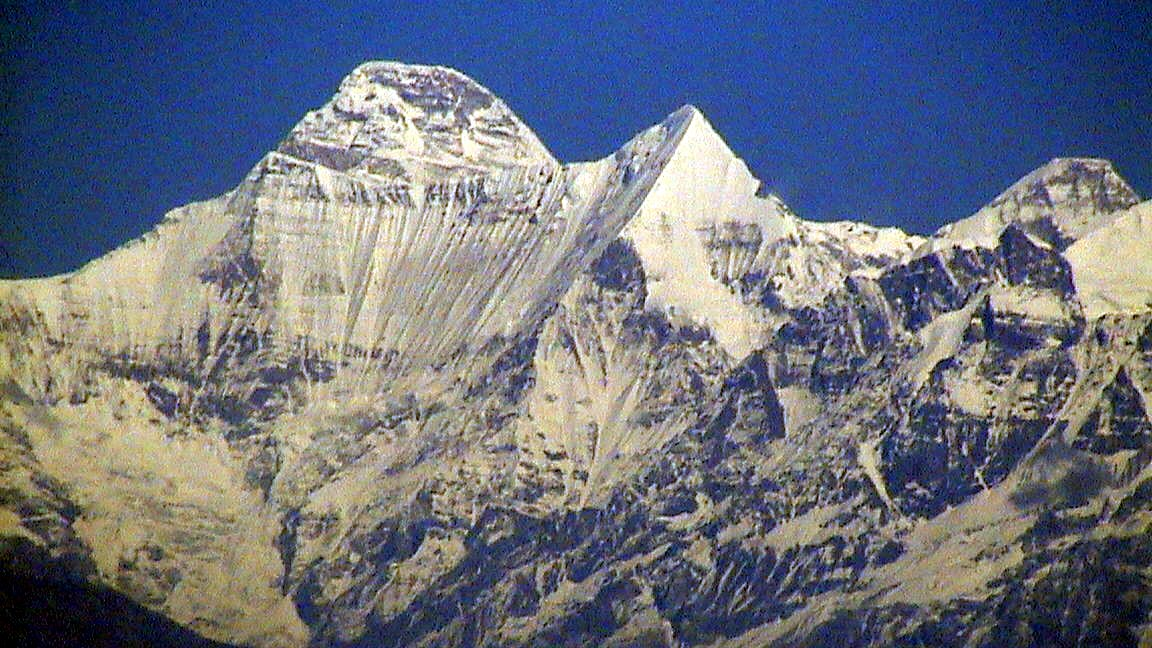
- Nanda Devi East (rightmost peak)

Highest point
- Elevation: 7,434 m (24,390 ft) list of highest mountains
- Prominence: 260 m (850 ft)
- Coordinates: 30°22′00″N 79°59′40″E

Geography
- Location within India
- Location: Chamoli District, Uttarakhand, India
- Parent range: Garhwal Himalayas

Climbing
- First ascent: 1939 by Jakub Bujak and Janusz Klarner.
- Easiest route: South ridge, from Lawan Gad via Longstaff Col: technical rock/snow/ice climb

Nanda Devi East, locally known as Sunanda Devi, is the lower of the two adjacent peaks of the highest mountain in Uttarakhand and second highest mountain in India; Nanda Devi is its higher twin peak. Nanda Devi and Nanda Devi East are part of the Garhwal Himalaya, and are located in the state of Uttarakhand. The two peaks are visible from almost everywhere in Kumaon. The first ascent of Nanda Devi East peak was probably in 1939 by Jakub Bujak and Janusz Klarner. The elevation of Nanda Devi East is 7,434 m (24,390 ft) and its prominence is 260 m (850 ft).

== Religious significance ==
Nanda Devi East is the lower eastern summit of the twin peaks of Nanda Devi, the two-peaked massif forming a 2-kilometre-long ridge, oriented east to west. The western summit is higher, and the eastern summit called Nanda Devi East is also locally referred to as Sunanda Devi. Together the peaks are sometimes referred to as the peaks of the goddesses Nanda and Sunanda, who already together in ancient Sanskrit literature

== Climbing history ==
A four-member Polish expedition led by Adam Karpiński climbed the Nanda Devi East peak in 1939 from Longstaff Col which is the standard route on the peak. The summit party was Jakub Bujak and Janusz Klarner.

In 1951 a French expedition attempted to traverse the ridge between Nanda Devi and Nanda Devi East for the first time, resulting in the death of two members. Tenzing Norgay was a part of the support team; he and Louis Dubost climbed Nanda Devi East to look for the missing pair. Tenzing later stated that it was the most difficult climb of his life, even more difficult than Everest.

Since then the peak has been reached by an Indo-French group in 1975 and perhaps also an Indian Army expedition in 1981 but the mountaineers in this last case did not survive to tell the story. The standard approach to the south ridge route is from the Milam Valley to the east, that passes through Lawan Glacier and onwards to Longstaff Col. The trek goes through the picturesque villages of Munsyari and Bhadeligwar.

In 1978, David Hopkins led the British Gharwal Himalayan Expedition which attempted to summit Nanda Devi East from the southwest face, transverse to the main summit of Nanda Devi and descend the south face of the main peak. This expedition was plagued by problems, notably the death of Ben Beattie, who was the expedition leader of the tragic Cairngorm Plateau disaster in 1971.

Marco Dalla Longa led a large Italian expedition of twelve members to Nanda Devi East Summit in 2005. They approached the peak from Munsyari and the Milam valley. Camps were set up to 5400m. The Italian team made good progress on Nanda Devi East, through the central pillar on the east face. They were proceeding towards the summit when a long spell of bad weather from 9 to 18 September made them sit up at the higher camps. Then tragedy struck the Italian team on Nanda Devi. Expedition leader Marco Dalla Longa died suddenly. He died by a coma stroke on 24 September. The team's doctor suspected cerebral oedema. Longa was young and fit, with no health problems reported during the expedition up to that time. The entire expedition was evacuated by air from 27 September to Munsyari and to Delhi by air the next day.

On 27 June 2019 (on the 80th anniversary of the first Polish expedition to Nanda Devi East) members of the Polish expedition - Jarosław Gawrysiak and Wojciech Flaczyński climbed the Nanda Devi East.

== Nanda Devi National Park and Valley of Flowers National Parks ==
Nanda Devi National Park along with the Valley of Flowers National Park are some of the most spectacular wilderness areas in the Himalayas. It is dominated by the peaks of Nanda Devi and Nanda Devi East of India's second highest mountain which is approached through the Rishiganga gorge, one of the deepest in the world. No humans live in the Park which has remained more or less intact because of its rugged inaccessibility. It has a very diverse flora and is the habitat of several endangered mammals, among them the snow leopard, serow, himalayan musk deer and bharal. Nanda Devi National Park lies in eastern Uttarakhand, near the Tibetan border in the Garhwal Himalaya, 300 km northeast of Delhi.

== Books ==
- Aitken, Bill. (reprinted 1994). The Nanda Devi Affair, Penguin Books India. ISBN 0-14-024045-4.
- Malhotra, Ashok (2011) Nude Besides the Lake, Createspace ISBN 978-1463529390
