= Vasuki Parbat =

Mountain in India

- Vasuki Parvat
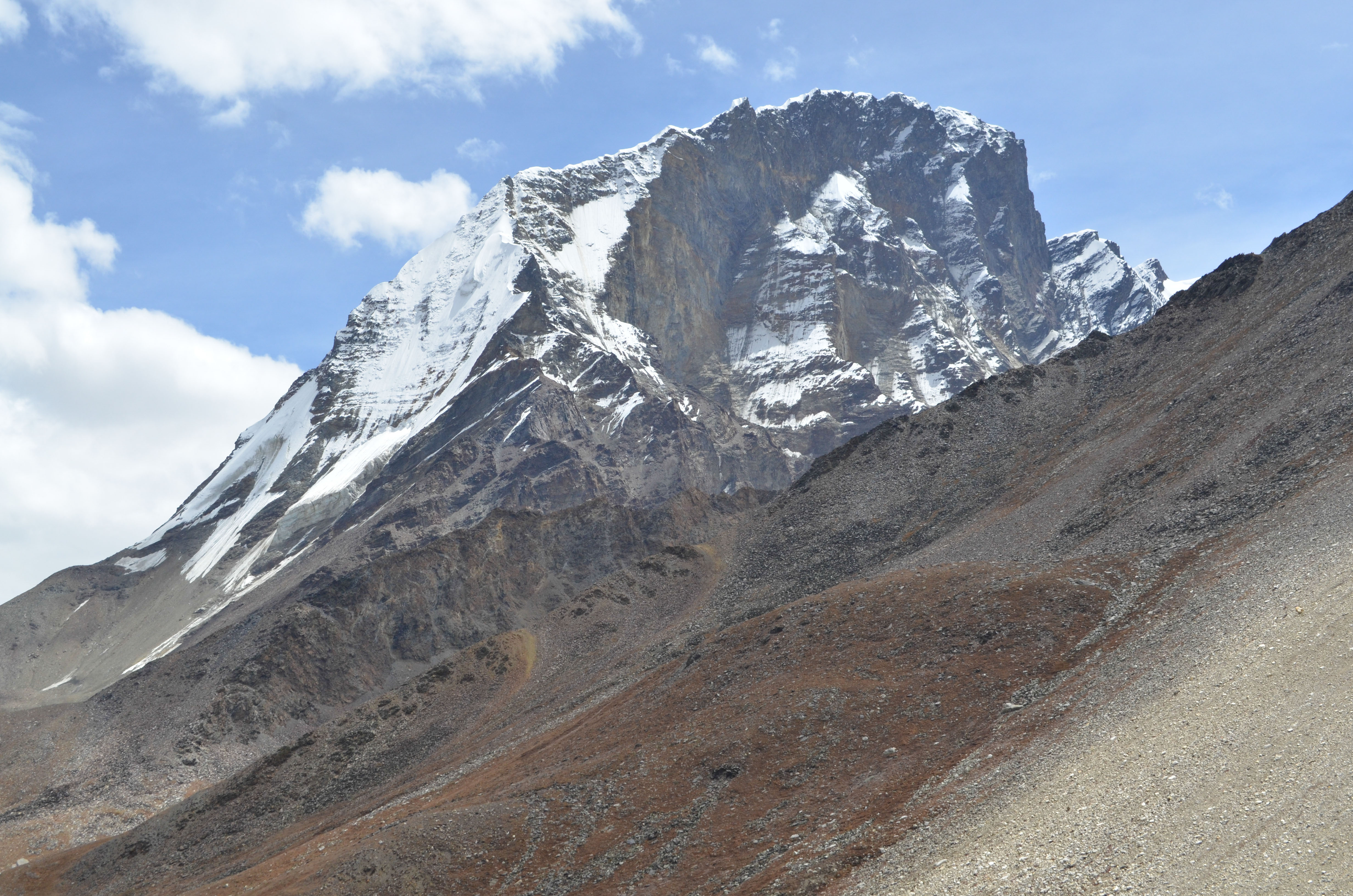

Highest point
- Elevation: 6,792 m (22,283 ft)
- Prominence: 547 m (1,795 ft)
- Coordinates: 30°52′30″N 79°10′30″E

Geography
- Location within Uttarakhand
- Location: Uttarakhand, India
- Parent range: Garhwal Himalaya

Climbing
- First ascent: ITBP claimed the first ascent in 1980 Expedition.

Vasuki Parbat or Vasuki Parvat (Hindi:वासुकी पर्वत) is a mountain range of Garhwal Himalaya in Vasuki Glacier Uttarakhand, India. It has a subsidiary peak, Vasuki south. Vasuki Parbat stands majestically at 6792 meter and the south peak 6702 at meter. Its the 35th highest located entirely within the uttrakhand India. Nanda Devi, is the highest mountain in this category.

== Climbing history ==
Indo-Tibet Border Police claimed The first recorded ascent that took place in 1973. However, the Indian Mountaineering Federation (IMF) does not recognize the ascent and the details of that climb have been kept secret. Vasuki Parbat was climbed by a Japanese team in 1980 summited for the second time via the east face, leading to the northeast ridge.

An attempt by a two-man team of Mick Fowler and Paul Ramsden in 2008.

An attempt by a three-man team of Nigel Cleaver, Mark Evans and Ian Johnson in 1980.

In October 2010, the four member British-New Zealand team made an alpine style ascent from the unclimbed west face, traverse of the main summit and descent from the northwest ridge. After establishing their base camp near the junction of Chaturangi and Vasuki Bamak at 4820 m, the attempt started on 3 October. During a continuous push, successive bivouacs were placed at 5400 m, 5700 m, 5900 m, 6000 m, 6200 m, 6500 m and 6700 m on the west face. Malcolm Bass with Paul Figg reached the summit on 12 October. After traversing the summit ridge, they descended the northwest ridge after a bivouac at 6250 m and reached base camp on 13 October 2010.

== Geography ==
It is surrounded by Glaciers on both side on the eastern side of the Vasuki Parbat is Sundar Bamak (Glacier), on the western side its Vasuki Glacier both the glacier in this area fed Chaturangi Glacier on the northern side.

The entire Vasuki Parbat and surrounding area are protected within the 2,390 km^{2} (920 sq mi) Gangotri National Park, the largest conservation area in India. The Gangotri National Park is home to several world-class treks, including Gangotri Gomukh Tapoban, Kerdarnath Vasuki tal trek. Har ki dun valley trek

== Neighboring peaks ==
neighboring peaks of Vasuki Parbat:

- Satopanth, 7,075 m (23,212 ft), 30°50′42″N 79°12′45″E
- Bhagirathi Parbat I, 6,856 m (22493 ft)30°51′00″N 79°08′57″E
- Bhagirathi Parbat II, 6,512 m (21365 ft)30°52′55″N 79°08′01″E
- Bhagirathi Parbat III, 6,454 m (21175 ft)30°52′09″N 79°08′01″E
- Shivling, 6,543 m (21467 ft)30°52′49.48″N 79°03′48.49″E

== Glaciers and rivers ==
Vasuki Parbat is surrounded by the Vasuki Glacier on the west side and Sundar Bamak (Glacier) on the east side northern side is surrounded by Chaturangi Glacier both east and west merge with Chaturangi Glacier. Chaturangi Glacier merge with Gangotri Glacier from the snout of Gangotri Glacier emerges Bhagirathi river also called Ganga or Ganges after it meets Alaknanda at Devprayag.

== See also ==
- List of Himalayan peaks of Uttarakhand
- Gangotri National Park
