= Gangotri Glacier =

Glacier in India

Gangotri
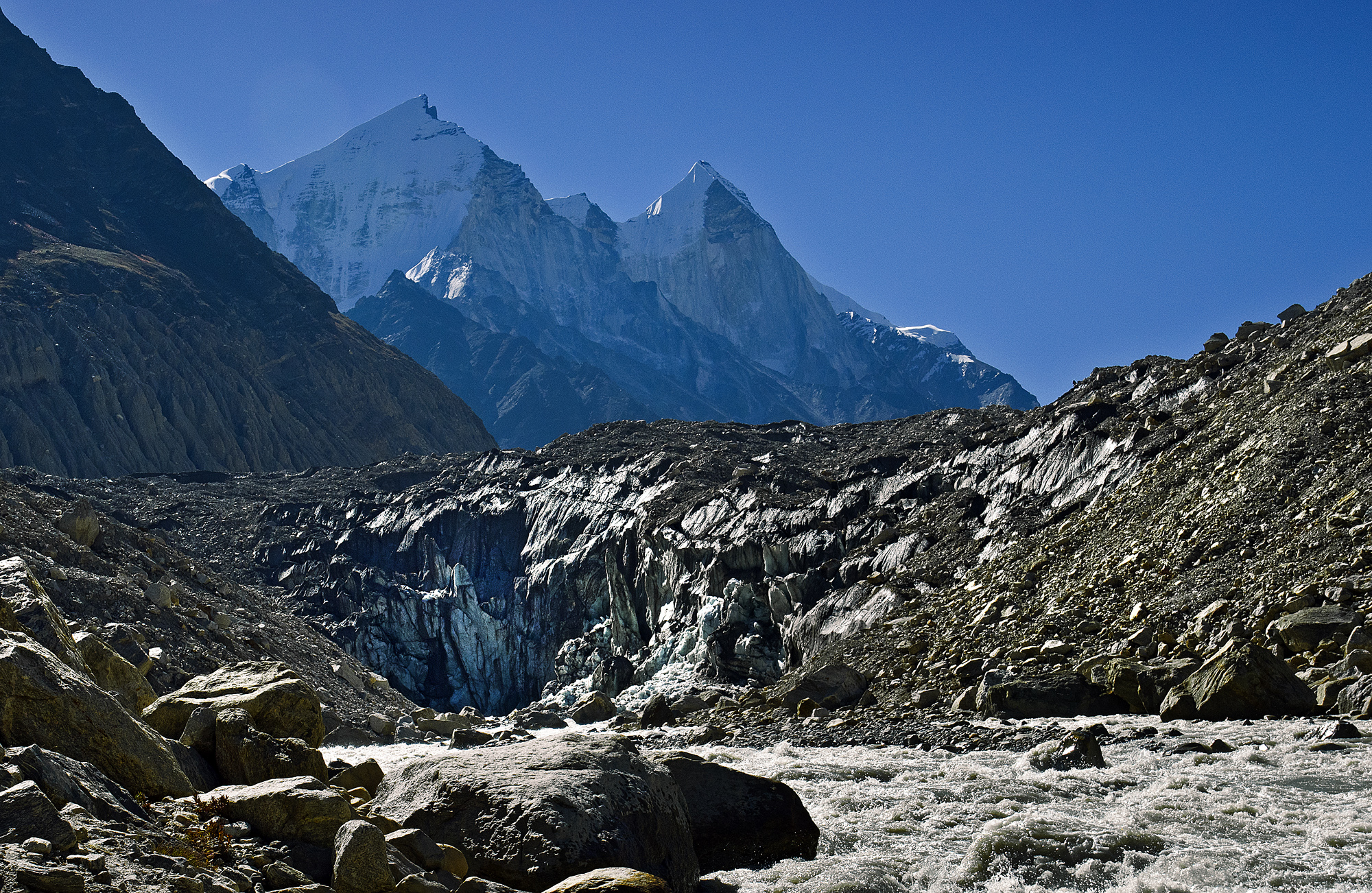
- Gomukh, terminus of the Gangotri glacier. The Bhagirathi peaks rise in the background.

- Location within Uttarakhand Location within India
- Interactive map of Gangotri
- Type: Valley glacier
- Location: India
- Coordinates: 30°50′N 79°10′E

Gangotri glacier (Sanskrit and Hindi: गंगोत्री) is located in Uttarkashi District, Uttarakhand, India in a region bordering Tibet. This glacier, one of the primary sources of the Ganges, has a volume of over 27 cubic kilometers. The glacier is about 30 kilometres (19 miles) long and 2 to 4 km (1.2 to 2.5 mi) wide. Around the glacier are the peaks of the Gangotri Group, including several peaks notable for extremely challenging climbing routes, such as Shivling, Thalay Sagar, Meru, and Bhagirathi III. It flows roughly northwest, originating in a cirque below Chaukhamba, the highest peak of the group.

The terminus of the Gangotri Glacier is said to resemble a cow's mouth, and the place is called Gomukh or Gaumukh (gou, cow + mukh, face). Gomukh, which is about 18 km (11.2 mi) from the town of Gangotri, is the precise source of the Bhagirathi river, an important tributary of the Ganges. Gomukh is situated near the base of Shivling; in between lies the Tapovan meadow.

The Gangotri glacier is a traditional Hindu pilgrimage site. Devout Hindus consider bathing in the icy waters near Gangotri town to be a holy ritual, and many made the trek to Gomukh, with a few continuing on to Tapovan. One needs to trek from Gangotri till Gaumukh, passing Devgadh, Chirbhasa, Bhojwasa en route. Currently accommodation is available only at Bhojwasa, although forest check posts are present at both Chirbhasa and Bhowasa. The 2013 North Indian Floods destroyed much of this trail, and access is now a little difficult beyond Chirbhasa due to trail deterioration and a 2 km wide rockfall site.

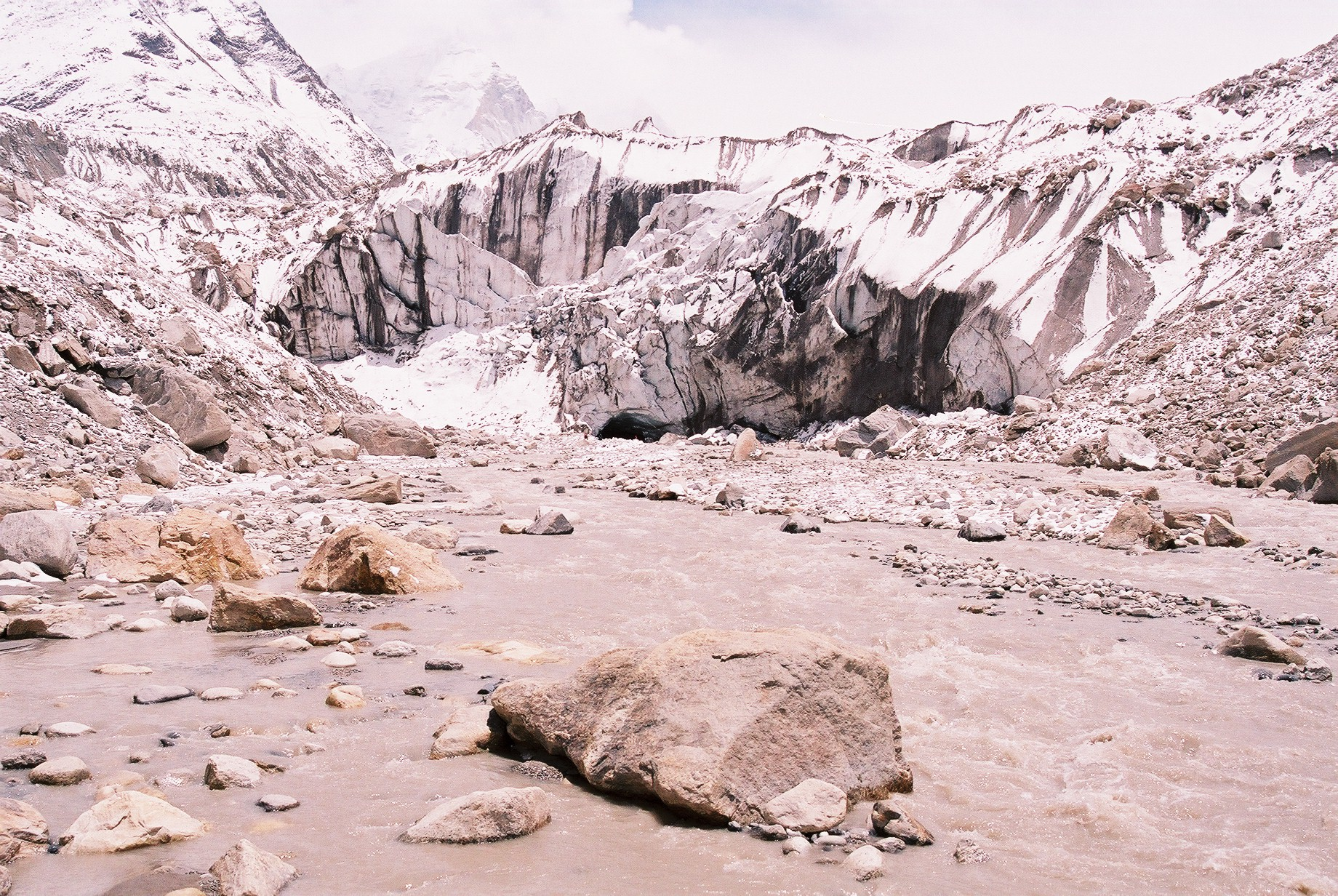
Gomukh

== Geology ==
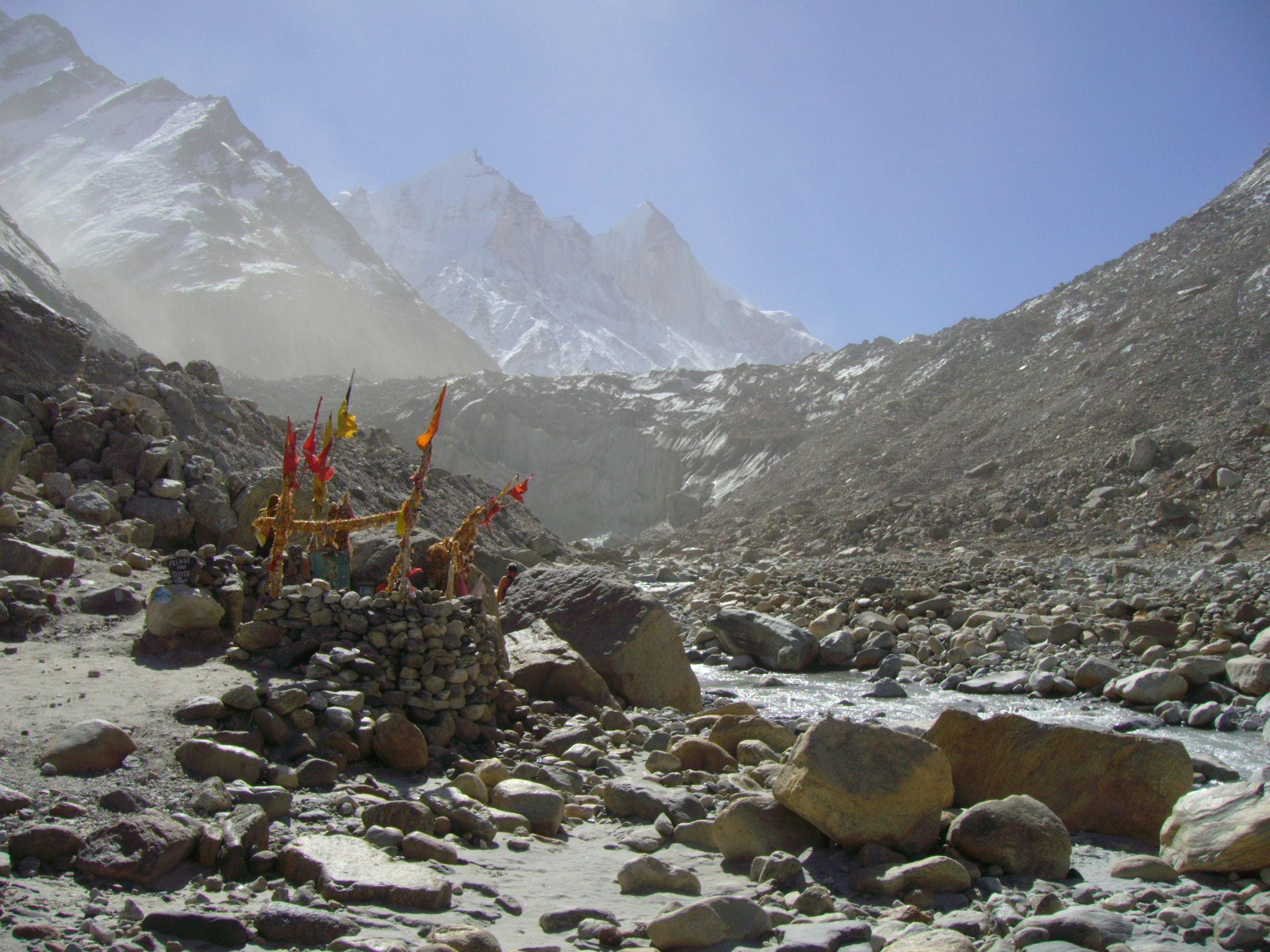
A small shrine at Gaumukh, Gangotri glacier.

It is a valley-type glacier, situated in the Uttarkashi district of Garhwal Himalaya, Uttarakhand and it flows to the NW direction. This glacier is bound between 30°43'22"–30°55'49" (lat.) and 79°4'41"–79°16'34" (long.), extending in height from 4120 to 7000 m.a.s.l. This area is situated north of the Main Central Thrust (MCT) and is made up of bedrocks of granites, garnet mica schist, quartz biotite schist, kyanite schist, augen gneiss and banded augen gneiss. The glacier is composed of a variety of depositional features such as talus cones, snow-avalanche fans, snow-bridges, and dead ice mounds, and erosional features like pyramidal and conical peaks, serrated ridge crests, glacial troughs, smooth rock walls and tails, waterfalls, rock basins, gullies and glacial lakes. All along the Gangotri glacier, several longitudinal and transverse crevasses are formed along which ice blocks have broken down. The ablation zone of the Gangotri glacier is covered by a thick pile of supraglacial moraines and is characterized by several ice sections, melting into pools of supraglacial lakes. Because of subsidence and the fast degenerating nature of the glacier, its centre is full of supraglacial lakes. In this part of higher Himalaya, glacial melt-water dominates the fluvial system.

The total ice cover is approximately 200 km^{2} and has about 20 km^{3} of ice in volume.

== Tributaries ==
This glacier has three main tributaries, namely Raktvarn (15.90 km), Chaturangi (including Kalindi bamak) (22.45 km) and Kirti (11.05 km) and more than 18 smaller tributary glaciers. The Raktvarn system contains 7 tributary glaciers; among them Thelu, Swetvarn, Nilambar and Pilapani are important. Similarly the Seeta, Suralaya and Vasuki are the major tributaries which make up the Chaturangi system, while the Kirti system is made up of only three tributary glaciers. Besides these three major tributary systems, some other tributary glaciers of this area drain directly into the Gangotri glacier; among them Swachand, Miandi, Sumeru and Ghanohim are important. Four other glaciers, Maitri, Meru, Bhrigupanth and Manda drain into the river Bhagirathi. The total glacierized area of the catchment is 258.56 km^{2}, out of which the Gangotri system comprises 109.03 km^{2}, followed by Chaturangi (72.91 km^{2}), Raktvarn (45.34 km^{2}) and Kirti (31.28 km^{2}). The remaining four glaciers contain 29.41 km^{2} of glacierized area; among them maximum contribution is Bhirgupanth glacier (14.95 km^{2}).

== Retreat ==
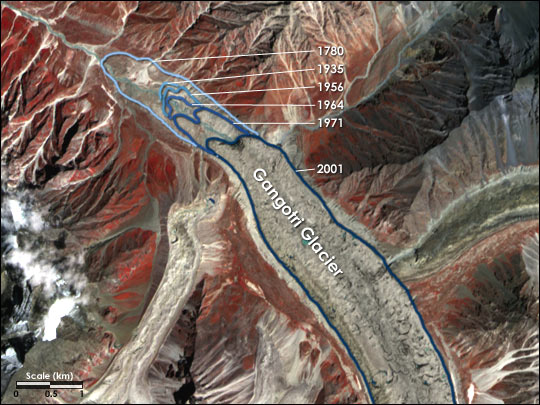
Retreat of Gangotri Glacier

NASA, in conjunction with scientists from United States Geological Survey (USGS) and the National Snow and Ice Data Center (NSIDC), is developing a global inventory of all the world's glaciers to help researchers track each glacier's history. According to them, the Gangotri glacier, currently 30.2 km long and between 0.5 and 2.5 km wide, is one of the largest in the Himalayas. This glacier has been constantly receding since measurements began in 1780. Data for 61 years (1936–96) showed the total recession of Gangotri glacier as 1147 m, with an average rate of 19 m per year. However over the last 25 years into the 21st century it has retreated more than 850 meters (34 meters per year), and 76 meters between 1996 and 1999 (25 meters per year).

== See also ==
- List of glaciers
- Gomukh
- Bara Shigri
