= Mount Shivling =

Mountain in Uttarakhand, India

Shivling
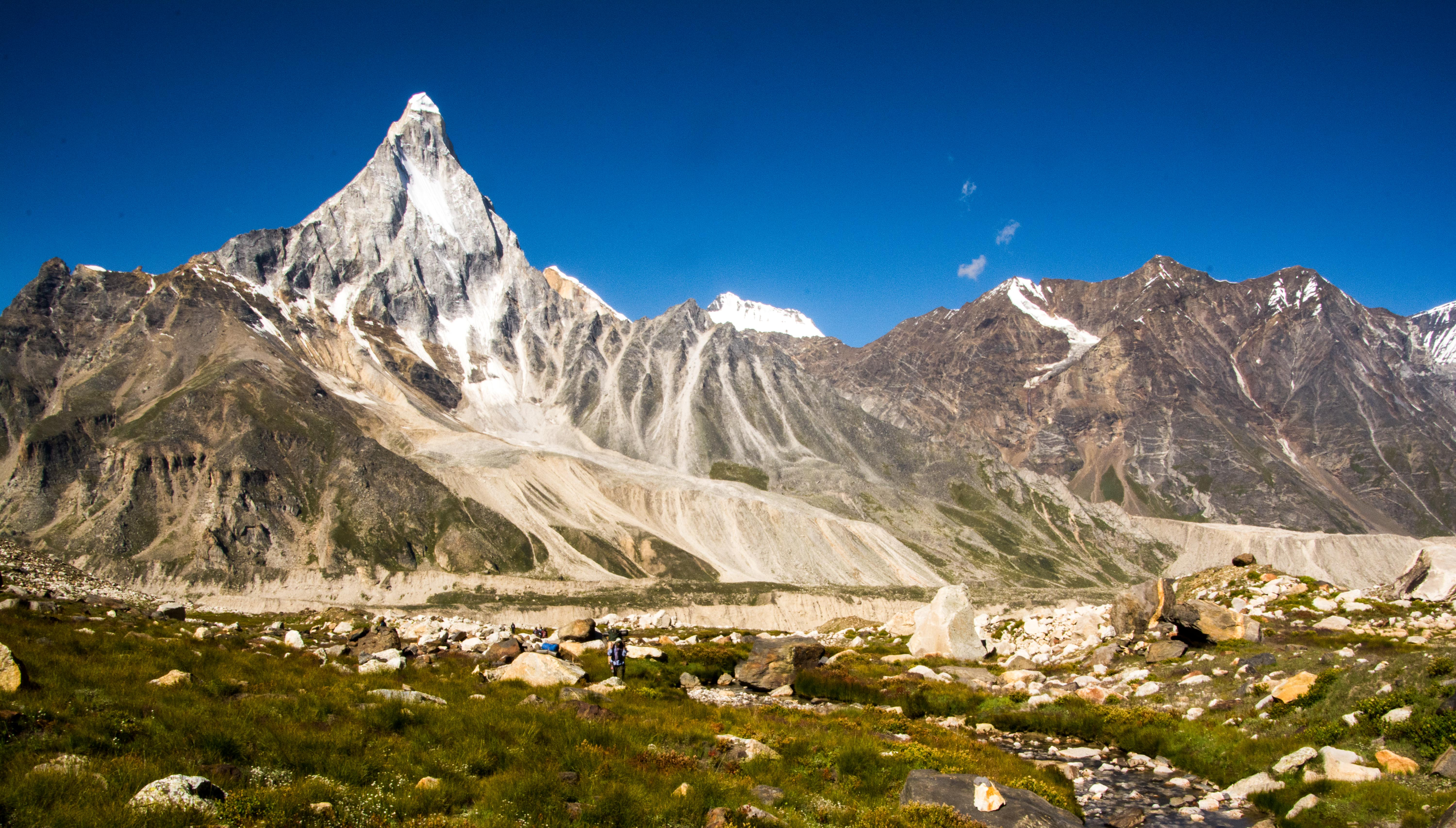
- Shivling (left) as seen from Nandanvan campsite

Highest point
- Elevation: 6,543 m (21,467 ft)
- Prominence: 850 m (2,790 ft)
- Coordinates: 30°52′49.48″N 79°03′48.49″E

Geography
- Location within India
- Location: Uttarakhand, India
- Parent range: Gangotri Group, Garhwal Himalayas

Climbing
- First ascent: 3 June 1974 by Hukam Singh, Laxman Singh, Ang Tharkey, Pemba Tharkey, Pasang Sherpa

Shivling is a mountain in the Gangotri Group of peaks in the western Garhwal Himalaya, near the snout of the Gangotri Glacier, one of the biggest glaciers in the Himalayas, and Tapovan, a meadow, both being also popular pilgrimage sites in Hinduism. It lies in the northern Indian state of Uttarakhand, 6 kilometres (4 mi) south of the Hindu holy site of Gaumukh (the source of the Bhagirathi River). Its name refers to its status as a sacred symbol – Shiva Linga. It was called "Matterhorn Peak" by early European visitors because of its similarity in appearance to that Alpine peak. While not of locally great elevation, it is a dramatic rock peak, and the most visually striking peak as seen from Gaumukh; that and the difficulty of the climb make it a famed prize for mountaineers.

== The mountain and its setting ==
Shivling forms the western gateway for the lower Gangotri Glacier, opposite the triple-peaked Bhagirathi massif. It lies on a spur projecting out from the main ridge that forms the southwest side of the Gangotri Glacier basin; this ridge contains other well-known peaks such as Bhagirathi, Thalay Sagar and Meru.

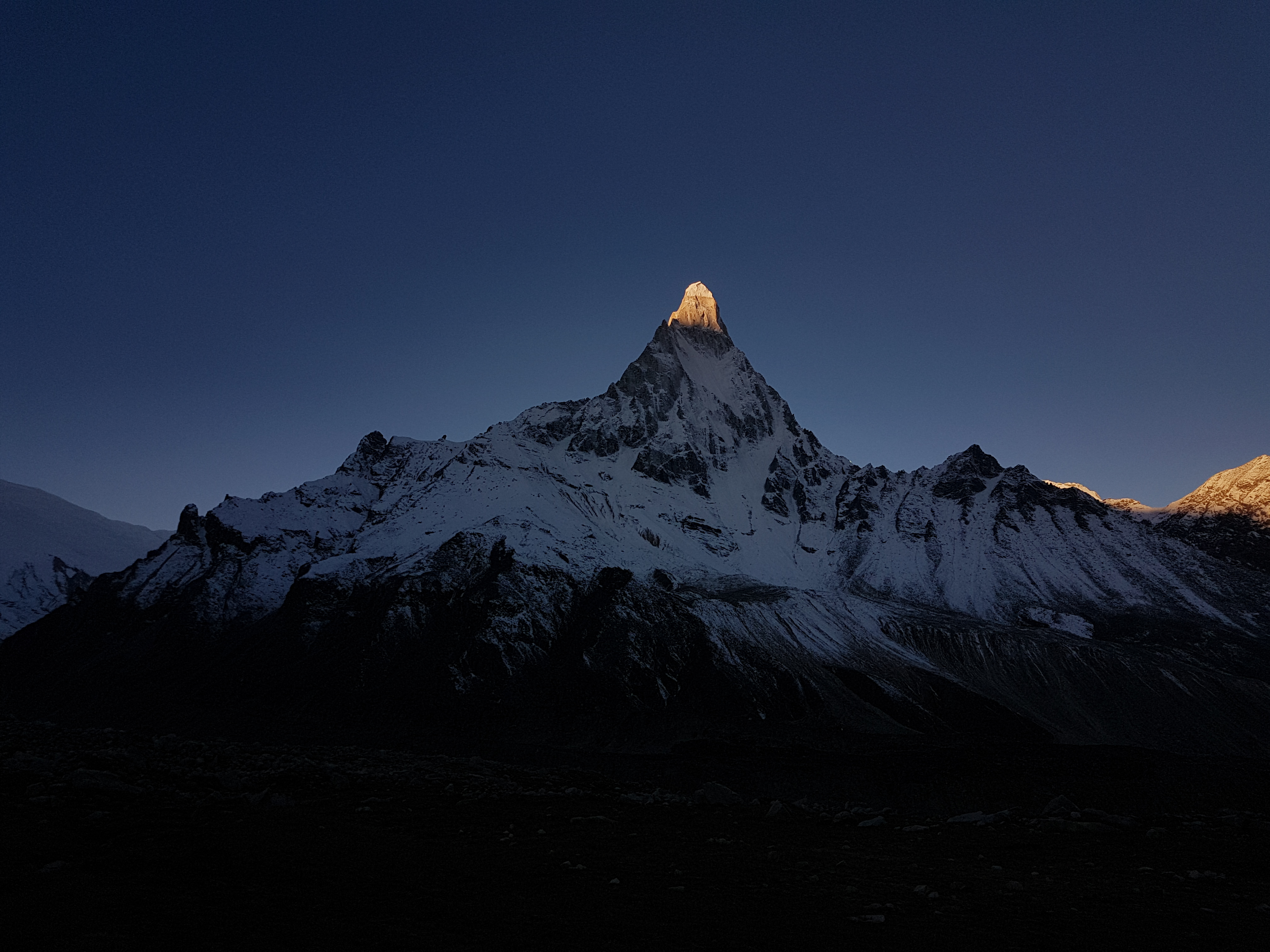
Mount Shivling, as seen from Nandanvan camp site during sunrise.

It was also called Mahadeo Ka Linga or (Mahadev Ka Linga) Appearing as a single pyramid when seen from Gaumukh, Shivling is actually a twin-summited mountain, with the northeast summit being slightly higher than the southwest summit, 6,501 m (21,329 ft). Between Gaumukh and Shivling lies the Tapovan meadow, a popular pilgrimage site due to its inspiring view of the mountain.

Shivling is well-defended on all sides by steep rock faces; only the west flank has a moderate enough slope for snow accumulation.

== Climbing history ==
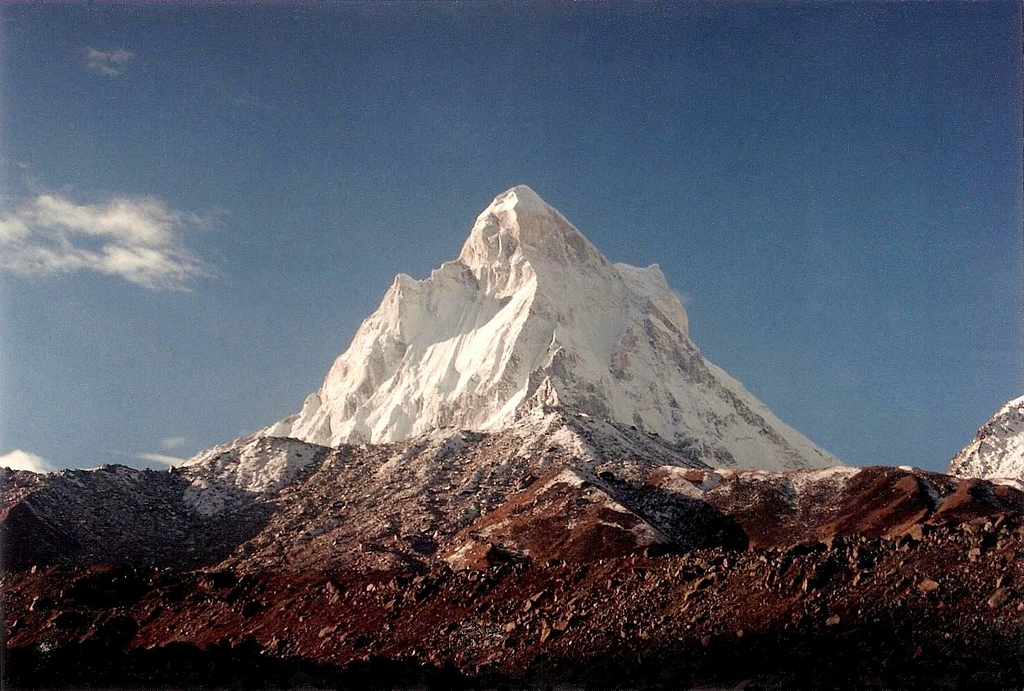
Shivling

After British exploration of the Gangotri Glacier in 1933, a German expedition led by R. Schwarzgruber climbed nearby peaks and did a reconnaissance of Shivling in 1938. They reported "no feasible route" on the mountain due to its steepness and the threat of falling seracs.

Shivling was first climbed on 3 June 1974 via the west ridge, by a team from the Indo-Tibetan Border Police, led by Hukam Singh. The ridge is the lowest-angle feature on the mountain, but still involves serious mixed climbing, and is threatened by the serac barrier noted by the Germans. The ridge leads to the col between the two summits; a steep snow/ice ridge then leads to the main summit.

Since the first ascent, at least ten other routes have been climbed on the peak, ascending all major ridges and most major faces of the mountain. All routes are extremely serious undertakings.

The North Pillar route was climbed in 1993 by Hans Kammerlander and Christoph Hainz.

In 2004 Shirshendu Mukherjee became the youngest person in the world to have climbed the mountain at the age of 19 as a part of an Indian expedition.

In 2005, Basanta Singha Roy and Debashis Biswas, both climbers from Mountaineers Association of Krishnanagar (MAK), West Bengal, India, were the first successful summiters from India, as a part of a civilian effort i.e. climbed by the help of a Sherpa guide with an expedition style.

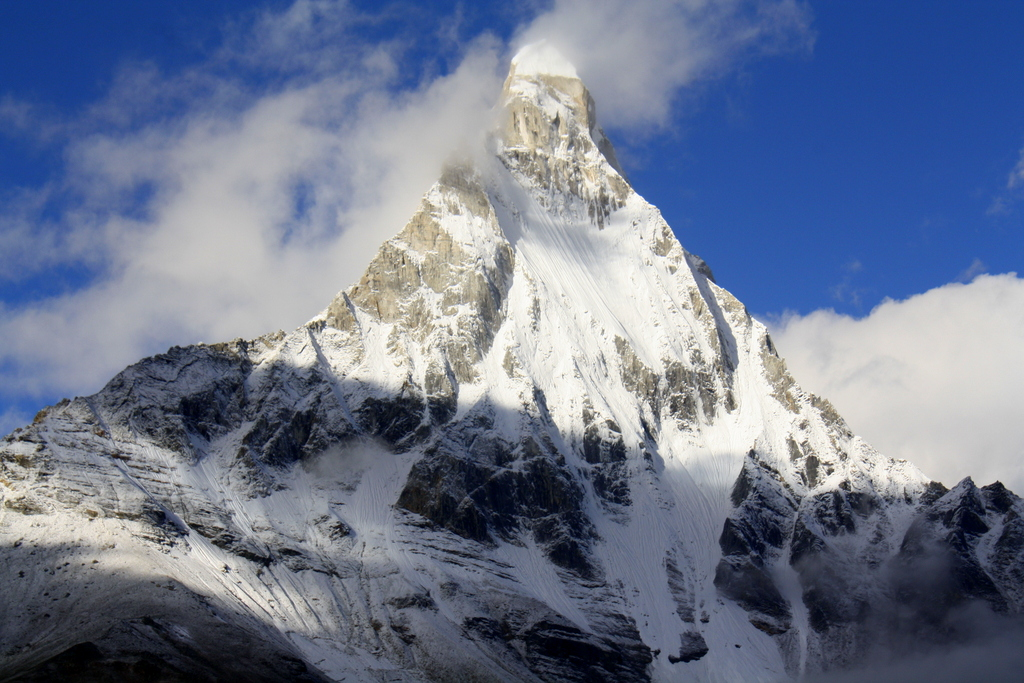
Mt. Shivling

On 25 May 2012, Valery Rozov made the first BASE jump from the summit of Shivling at an altitude of 6,420 metres (21,060 ft) wearing a wingsuit.

In September 2024, an Indian-led expedition consisting of Indian mountaineers Kanak Puri, Rialch Rajat and Vivek Anand, along with German-Swiss alpinist and physician Christian Crott, attempted another ascent via the West Face under the leadership of Sunny Sharma (White Magic) and Sherpas Pasang, Ang Kami, and Lenthup Bhutia in expedition style. Due to increased icefall and avalanches (the biggest one very close to CII), the summit team withdrew from Camp II at 5,800 m after five days. The plan for a second summit attempt had to be abandoned due to unusual low pressure over northern India, which brought heavy rain and snowfall, particularly over Uttar Pradesh and Uttarakhand.
