= Silvo Karo =

Slovenian mountaineer, born 1960

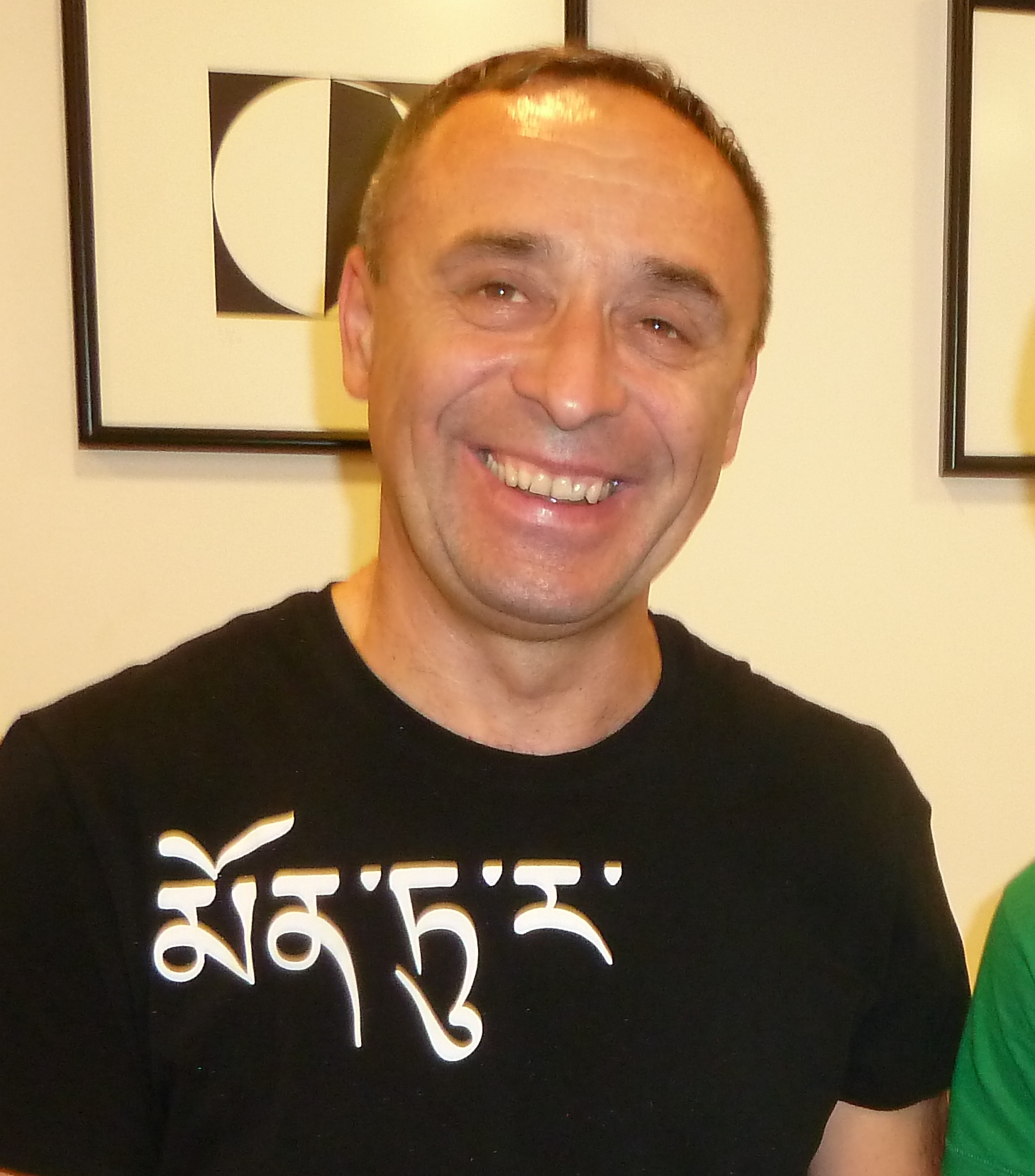
- Born: December 22, 1960 (age 65); Ljublijana, Slovenia
- Occupation: Mountaineer
- Years active: 1977-current
- Employer(s): Founder and director of the Mountaineering Film Festival
- Known for: Alpine-style climber and mountaineer
- Spouse: Alma Karo (1992–present)
- Honours: Piolets d'Or Lifetime Achievement award (2022), Republic of Slovenia Order of Merit (2010)
- Website: www.silvokaro.com

Silvo Karo (born December 22, 1960) is a Slovenian mountaineer. He has climbed over 2,000 routes and has made more than 300 first ascents on mountains around the world, from Patagonia, to the Alps to the Himalayas in a mountaineering career that has spanned over 40 years. Alongside Janez Jeglič - Johan and Franček Knez he was noted for ushering in a new golden age of Slovenian mountaineering. In 2022, he was awarded the Piolet d'Or for lifetime achievement.

== Climbing career ==
Karo began climbing in 1976, with a climb on Triglav in the Julian Alps with a local priest. He would go on to an extensive mountaineering career, that would take him from 8a graded sport climbs to eight-thousanders. He became recognized for his alpine-style ascents on the great walls of Fitz Roy, Cerro Torre and Torre Egger in Patagonia and Bhagirathi in the Himalayas.

In 1988, Karo initiated the building of the first climbing wall in Slovenia, and managed the project to completion.

Karo is also a photographer, writer, videographer, and winner of numerous awards: the Bloudk Prize (1987), the Silver Gentian for best mountaineering film (Cerro Torre South Face), the UIAA Award (Trento, Italy, 1989), the Silver Gentian for achievements in alpinism (Trento, Italy, 1998), gold medals for alpinist achievements (Milan, Italy, 2000), Bloudko plaques (Ljubljana, 1991). His essay on the granite giants of Patagonia was featured in the book Voices from the Summit, published by National Geographic.

In the 1980s, he was a guest at the Mountain Film Festival in Trento, Italy. He enjoyed the experience and in 2002, he held the first Slovenian mountain film festival in Bled. In 2007, he made the Mountain Film Festival an annual event.

=== Later years ===
In 2010, he received the Order of Merit from the President of Slovenia in honor of his contribution to Slovenian mountaineering and image abroad. He is an honorary member of the Alpine Club. In 2018, his autobiography entitled Rock'n' Roll on the Wall ISBN 9788885475878 was published. In 2022, he became the second Slovenian alpinist to receive the Piolets d'Or for lifetime achievement.

== Notable climbs ==
- 1983: Fitz Roy, east face, new route, Devil’s Dihedral (6a A2 90°).
- 1985: Yalung Kang, north face, new route, reached 8,100m. Grandes Jorasses, north face, third ascent of Rolling Stones (6b A3 80°)
- 1986: Cerro Torre, east face, new route, Hell’s Direct (7a A4 M6 95°) Broad Peak, normal route. Torre Egger, southeast face, new route, Psycho Vertical (6c A3 90°).
- 1987: Lhotse Shar, southeast ridge, reached 7,300m 1987–88. Cerro Torre, south face, new route (6b A4 75°)
- 1990: Bhagirathi III, west face, new route (6b A4 85°). Everest, west ridge to 7,500m
- 1993: El Capitan, Wyoming Sheep Ranch (5.10 A5)
- 1996: Nalumasortoq, new route, Mussel Power (7a A3). El Capitan, Salathé Wall in 10h 25min. Half Dome, Direct Northwest Face, 11h 20mins (speed record at that time)
- 1997: El Capitan, West Face (5.11c) in eight hours car to car
- 1999: Fitz Roy, west face, Ensueno, second overall and first free ascent (6b+ obl 45°). Fitz Roy, Slovak Route, alpine style with new variation from Glaciar Torre (6c 40°)
- 2000: La Esfinge, Cordillera Blanca new route, Cruz del Sur (7b)
- 2002: Grand Pilier d’Angle, Divine Providence to Mont Blanc summit
- 2003: Cerro Murallón, first ascent of main summit
- 2005: Cerro Torre, southeast ridge, new route, Slovenian Sit Start (in a single push of 28 hours; 7a A2 70°).
- 2006: Trango Towers, Eternal Flame, first one-day ascent (7a A2 M5)
- 2009: Tofana di Rozes, south face, Goodbye 1999 (7b on sight, repeat).
