= Lhatu Dhura =

Mountain in Uttarakhand, India

- Location within Uttarakhand

Highest point
- Elevation: 6,392 m (20,971 ft)
- Prominence: 229 m (751 ft)
- Coordinates: 30°23′29″N 80°01′49″E

Geography
- Location: Uttarakhand, India
- Parent range: Garhwal Himalaya

Lhatu Dhura is a mountain of the Garhwal Himalaya in Uttarakhand, India. It is situated in the eastern rim of the Nanda Devi Sanctuary, on the watershed of the Milam Glacier and the Nanda Devi basin. The elevation of Lhatu Dhura is 6,392 metres (20,971 ft) and its prominence is 229 metres (751 ft). It is joint 103rd highest mountain located entirely within Uttrakhand (Nanda Devi is the highest mountain). It lies 4.6 km south of Sakram 6,254 metres (20,518 ft). Its nearest higher neighbor Nanda Devi East (7,401 metres (24,281 ft)) lies 4.5 km to the south west, and Deo Damla (6,620 metres (21,719 ft)) lies 7.7 km to the north; it is 6.1 km east-north-east of Nanda Devi (7,816 metres (25,643 ft)), and 9.5 km south of Mangraon (6,387 metres (20,955 ft)).

== Neighboring and subsidiary peaks ==
Neighboring or subsidiary peaks of Lhatu Dhura:

- Nanda Devi: 7,816 m (25,643 ft)30°55′12″N 79°35′30″E
- Rishi Pahar: 6,992 m (22,940 ft)30°31′48″N 79°59′24″E
- Lohar Deo: 6,245 m (20,489 ft)30°26′35″N 80°07′22″E
- Sakram 6,254 m (20,518 ft)30°25′58″N 80°02′03″E
- Rishi Kot: 6,236 m (20,459 ft)30°27′25″N 79°53′33″E
- Changabang: 6,864 m (22,520 ft)30°30′00″N 79°55′37″E
- Kalanka: 6,931 m (22,740 ft)30°30′12″N 79°56′30″E
- Saf Minal: 6,911 m (22,674 ft)30°31′43″N 79°58′01″E

== Glaciers and rivers ==
Lhatu Dhura stands at the head of the western side of Timphu Glacier and between Timphu glacier and Pachhu Glacier. Both the glacier flows down from west to east and the streams emerges from these glacier Timphu Gad and Pachhu Gad joins Goriganga River. Goriganga River emerges from the snout of Milam glacier that later joins the Kali River at Jauljibi. On the western side Uttari Nanda Devi Glacier flows down north and joins Uttari Rishi Glacier from the snout of Uttari Rishi Glacier emerges Rish Ganga. Rishi Ganga met with Dhauliganga River near Rini. Later Dhauli ganga met with Alaknanda at Vishnuprayag. Alaknanda River is one of the main tributaries of river Ganga that later joins Bhagirathi River the other main tributaries of river Ganga at Devprayag and became Ganga there after.

== See also ==
- List of Himalayan peaks of Uttarakhand
