= Mangraon =

Mountain in Uttarakhand, India

- Location within Uttarakhand

Highest point
- Elevation: 6,568 m (21,549 ft)
- Prominence: 563 m (1,847 ft)
- Coordinates: 30°28′31″N 80°00′40″E

Geography
- Location: Uttarakhand, India
- Parent range: Garhwal Himalaya

Mangraon is a mountain of the Garhwal Himalaya in Uttarakhand India. It is situated in the eastern rim of Nanda Devi Sanctuary on the watershed of Milam Glacier and Nanda Devi basin. The elevation of Mangraon is 6,568 metres (21,549 ft) and its prominence is 563 metres (1,847 ft). It is joint 71st highest located entirely within the Uttrakhand. Nanda Devi, is the highest mountain in this category. It lies 1.8 km SSE of Deo Damla 6,568 metres (21,549 ft) its nearest higher neighbor. Rishi Pahar 6,992 metres (22,940 ft) lies 6.5 km North and it is 11.8 km NNE of Nanda Devi 7,816 metres (25,643 ft). It lies 9.5 km north of Lhatu Dhura 6,387 metres (20,955 ft).

== Neighboring and subsidiary peaks ==
Neighboring or subsidiary peaks of Mangraon:

- Nanda Devi: 7,816 m (25,643 ft)30°55′12″N 79°35′30″E
- Rishi Pahar: 6,992 m (22,940 ft)30°31′48″N 79°59′24″E
- Lohar Deo: 6,245 m (20,489 ft)30°26′35″N 80°07′22″E
- Lhatu Dhura: 6,392 m (20,971 ft)30°23′29″N 80°01′49″E
- Rishi Kot: 6,236 m (20,459 ft)30°27′25″N 79°53′33″E
- Changabang: 6,864 m (22,520 ft)30°30′00″N 79°55′37″E
- Kalanka: 6,931 m (22,740 ft)30°30′12″N 79°56′30″E
- Saf Minal: 6,911 m (22,674 ft)30°31′43″N 79°58′01″E
- Bamchu: 6,303 m (20,679 ft)30°26′56″N 80°01′18″E

== Glaciers and rivers ==
It stands at the head of the western side of Mangraon Glacier. The glacier flows from west to east and joins Milam Glacier. Further down south east from the snout of Milam glacier emerges Goriganga River that later joins the Kali River at Jauljibi. On the western side Uttari Rishi Glacier joins Uttari Nanda Devi Glacier and drains into Rish Ganga. Rishi Ganga met with Dhauliganga River near Rini. Later Dhauli ganga met with Alaknanda at Vishnuprayag. Alaknanda River is one of the main tributaries of river Ganga that later joins Bhagirathi River the other main tributaries of river Ganga at Devprayag and became Ganga there after.

== See also ==
- List of Himalayan peaks of Uttarakhand
