= Sakram =

Mountain in Uttarakhand, India

- Location within Uttarakhand

Highest point
- Elevation: 6,254 m (20,518 ft)
- Prominence: 134 m (440 ft)
- Coordinates: 30°25′58″N 80°02′03″E

Geography
- Location: Uttarakhand, India
- Parent range: Garhwal Himalaya

Climbing
- First ascent: In 1934 climbed by Eric Shipton's party.

Sakram is a mountain of the Garhwal Himalaya in Uttarakhand India. It's situated on the eastern rim of Nanda Devi Sanctuary on the watershed of Milam Glacier and Nanda Devi basin. The elevation of Sakram is 6,254 metres (20,518 ft) and its prominence is 134 metres (440 ft). It is 129th highest located entirely within the Uttrakhand. Nanda Devi, is the highest mountain in this category. It lies 1.2 km SSW of Lohar Deo 6,267 metres (20,561 ft) its nearest higher neighbor and 3.3 km SSE of Deo Damla 6,620 metres (21,719 ft). Kalanka 6,931 metres (22,740 ft) lies 11.9 km NNW and 8.7 km SW lies Nanda Devi 7,816 metres (25,643 ft).

== Climbing history ==
Sakram 6,254 metres (20,518 ft) was first climbed by Eric Shipton's team in 1934 expedition into the Nanda Devi sanctuary.

A British team led by Colin Read climbed Sakram via south east face in 1976.

== Glaciers and rivers ==
Sakram Glacier on the eastern side joins Milam Glacier from there emerges Goriganga River that later joins the Kali River at Jauljibi. Uttari Nanda Devi Glacier on the western side joins Uttari Rishi Glacier and drains into Rish Ganga. Rishi Ganga met with Dhauliganga River near Rini. Later Dhauli ganga met with Alaknanda at Vishnuprayag. Alaknanda River is one of the main tributaries of river Ganga that later joins Bhagirathi River the other main tributaries of river Ganga at Devprayag and became Ganga there after.

== Neighboring peaks ==
Neighboring peaks of Sakram:

- Nanda Devi: 7,816 m (25,643 ft)30°55′12″N 79°35′30″E
- Deo Damla: 6,620 m (21,719 ft)30°27′36″N 80°01′09″E
- Lohar Deo: 6,245 m (20,489 ft)30°26′35″N 80°07′22″E
- Lhatu Dhura: 6,392 m (20,971 ft)30°23′29″N 80°01′49″E
- Rishi Kot: 6,236 m (20,459 ft)30°27′25″N 79°53′33″E
- Changabang: 6,864 m (22,520 ft)30°30′00″N 79°55′37″E

== See also ==
- List of Himalayan peaks of Uttarakhand
