= Bamchu =

Mountain in Uttarakhand, India

- Location within Uttarakhand

Highest point
- Elevation: 6,303 m (20,679 ft)
- Prominence: 241 m (791 ft)
- Listing: Mountains of Uttarakhand
- Coordinates: 30°26′56″N 80°01′18″E

Geography
- Location: Uttarakhand, India
- Parent range: Garhwal Himalaya

Climbing
- First ascent: 1975 by a Japanese team led by K Shimizu.

Bamchu is a mountain of the Garhwal Himalaya in Uttarakhand India. It's situated on the eastern rim of Nanda Devi Sanctuary on the watershed of Milam Glacier and Nanda Devi basin. The elevation of Bamchu is 6,303 metres (20,679 ft) and its prominence is 241 metres (791 ft). It is 124th highest located entirely within the Uttrakhand. Nanda Devi, is the highest mountain in this category. It lies 3.4 km South of Deo Damla 6,620 metres (21,719 ft) its nearest higher neighbor and 3.1 km SSE of Mangraon 6,568 metres (21,549 ft). Kalanka 6,931 metres (22,740 ft) lies 9.8 km NNW and 9.3 km SW lies Nanda Devi 7,816 metres (25,643 ft).

== Climbing history ==
In 1975 Bamchu was first climbed by a Japanese team led by K Shimizu. The main team was focusing on Rishi pahar at the same time K. Konno who had to leave early choose to climb Bamchu. They set up an advance base camp at the foot of the south ridge of Bamchu. On 19 September K. Konno and liaison officer Capt. B. P. S Hundal made an attempt for the summit. They climbed the south ridge of the peak. After climbing for about ten hours, they reached the summit of Bamchu at 3.05 p.m.

== Glaciers and rivers ==
Bamchu Glacier on the eastern side joins Milam Glacier from there emerges Goriganga River that later joins the Kali River at Jauljibi. Uttari Nanda Devi Glacier on the western side joins Uttari Rishi Glacier and drains into Rish Ganga. Rishi Ganga met with Dhauliganga River near Rini. Later Dhauli ganga met with Alaknanda at Vishnuprayag. Alaknanda River is one of the main tributaries of river Ganga that later joins Bhagirathi River the other main tributaries of river Ganga at Devprayag and became Ganga there after.

== Neighboring peaks ==
Neighboring peaks of Sakram:

- Nanda Devi: 7,816 m (25,643 ft)30°55′12″N 79°35′30″E
- Deo Damla: 6,620 m (21,719 ft)30°27′36″N 80°01′09″E
- Mangraon: 6,568 m (21,549 ft)30°28′31″N 80°00′40″E
- Lohar Deo: 6,245 m (20,489 ft)30°26′35″N 80°07′22″E
- Lhatu Dhura: 6,392 m (20,971 ft)30°23′29″N 80°01′49″E
- Rishi Kot: 6,236 m (20,459 ft)30°27′25″N 79°53′33″E
- Changabang: 6,864 m (22,520 ft)30°30′00″N 79°55′37″E
