= Deo Damla =

Mountain in Uttarakhand, India

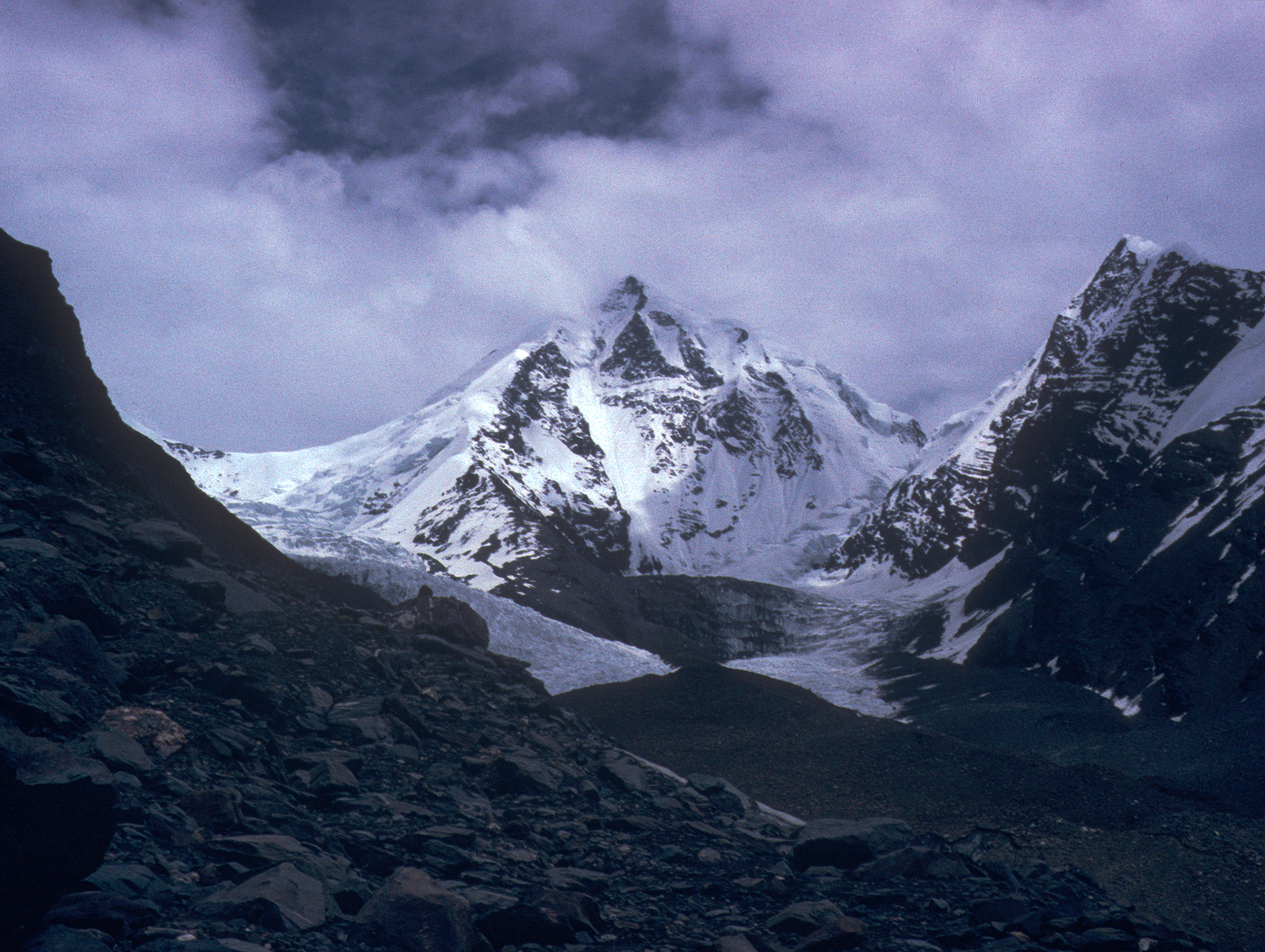
- Deo Damla peak from approach valley, 1980

Highest point
- Elevation: 6,620 m (21,720 ft)
- Prominence: 693 m (2,274 ft)
- Listing: Mountains of Uttarakhand
- Coordinates: 30°27′36″N 80°01′09″E

Geography
- Location within Uttarakhand
- Location: Uttarakhand, India
- Parent range: Garhwal Himalayas

Climbing
- First ascent: 23 September 1936 by Eric Shipton, Ang Tharkay and Ang Dawa.

Deo Damla is a mountain of the Garhwal Himalayas in Uttarakhand, India. It is situated in the eastern rim of Nanda Devi Sanctuary on the watershed of Milam Glacier and Nanda Devi basin. The elevation of Deo Damla is 6,620 metres (21,719 ft) and its prominence is 693 metres (2,274 ft). It is 63rd highest located entirely within the Uttrakhand. Nanda Devi, is the highest mountain in this category. It lies 1.8 km SSE of Mangraon 6,568 metres (21,549 ft). Its nearest higher neighbor Rishi Pahar 6,992 metres (22,940 ft) lies 8.3 km NNW and it is 10.6 km SSW of Nanda Devi 7,816 metres (25,643 ft). It lies 1.4 km north of Bamchu 6,303 metres (20,679 ft).

== Climbing history ==
It was first climbed by Eric Shipton and sherpa's Ang Tharkay and Ang Dawa in 1936 during Osmaston–Shipton 1936 expedition, as members of Major Osmaston's party which went into the Nanda Devi region under the orders of the Surveyor-General in 1936. They climbed a 6,640-metre (21,770 ft) peak on the watershed overlooking the Milam glacier and camped at about 5,300 metres (17,500 ft) in a subsidiary valley. On 23 September they started before dawn to climb up a steep and difficult ice ridge which involved of step-cutting. Ang Dawa became exhausted early in the climb, and by the time Ang Tharkay and Eric Shipton reached the top the Milam glacier was filled with cloud, and they did not get the view they had hoped for. It was an unnamed peak at that time but highest on that side.

== Neighboring and subsidiary peaks ==
Neighboring or subsidiary peaks of Deo Damla:

- Nanda Devi: 7,816 m (25,643 ft)30°55′12″N 79°35′30″E
- Mangraon: 6,568 m (21,549 ft)30°28′31″N 80°00′40″E
- Lohar Deo: 6,245 m (20,489 ft)30°26′35″N 80°07′22″E
- Lhatu Dhura: 6,392 m (20,971 ft)30°23′29″N 80°01′49″E
- Rishi Kot: 6,236 m (20,459 ft)30°27′25″N 79°53′33″E
- Changabang: 6,864 m (22,520 ft)30°30′00″N 79°55′37″E

== Glaciers and rivers ==
On the eastern side it stands between Bamchu Glacier and Mangraon Glacier. Both these glacier's joins Milam Glacier further east, from the snout of Milam glacier emerges Goriganga River that later joins the Kali River at Jauljibi. On the western side Uttari Nanda Devi Glacier joins Uttari Rishi Glacier and drains into Rish Ganga. Rishi Ganga met with Dhauliganga River near Rini. Later Dhauli ganga met with Alaknanda at Vishnuprayag. Alaknanda River is one of the main tributaries of river Ganga that later joins Bhagirathi River the other main tributaries of river Ganga at Devprayag and became Ganga there after.

== Gallery ==
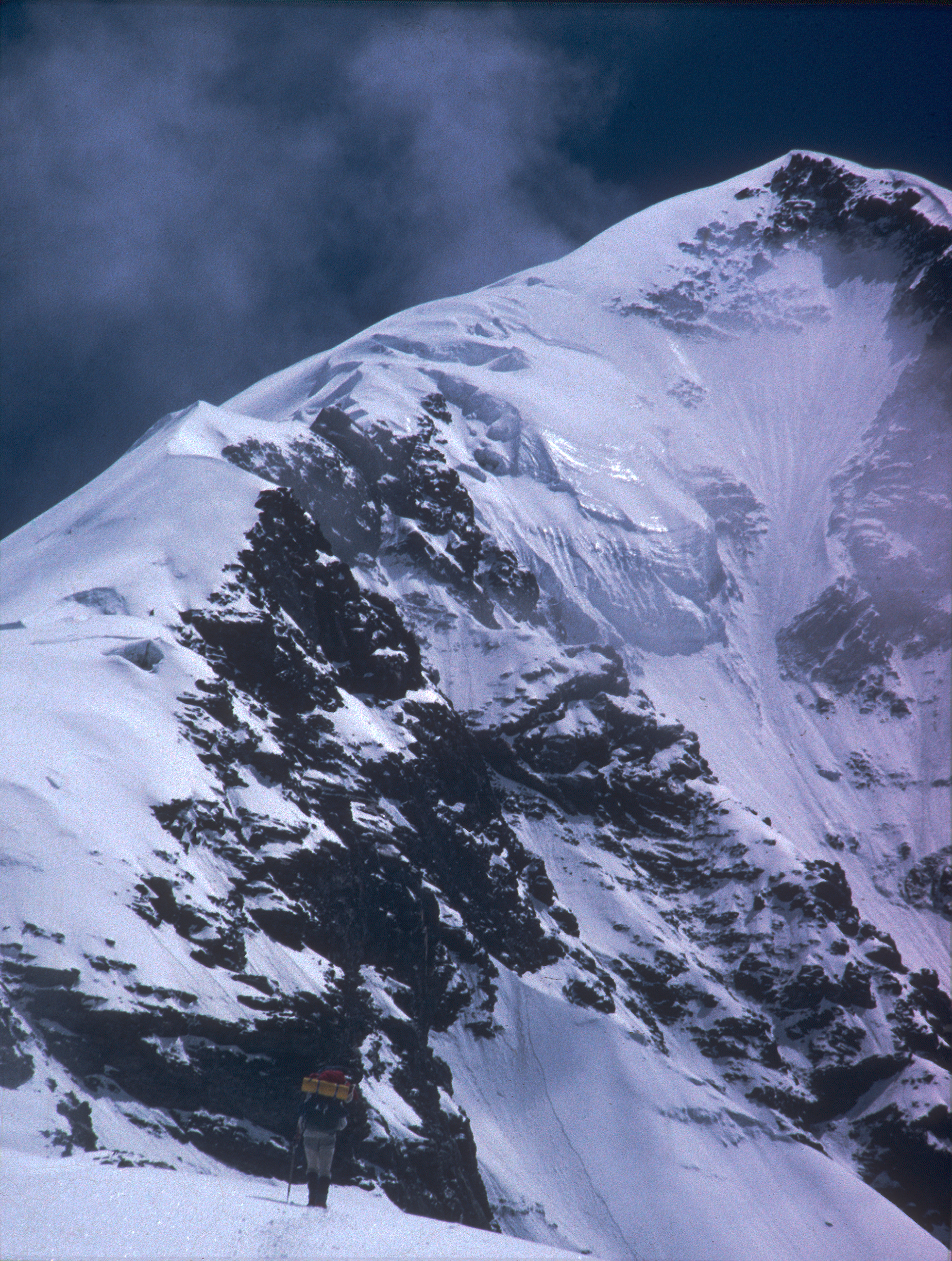
Deo Damla peak from above camp2 SW ridge

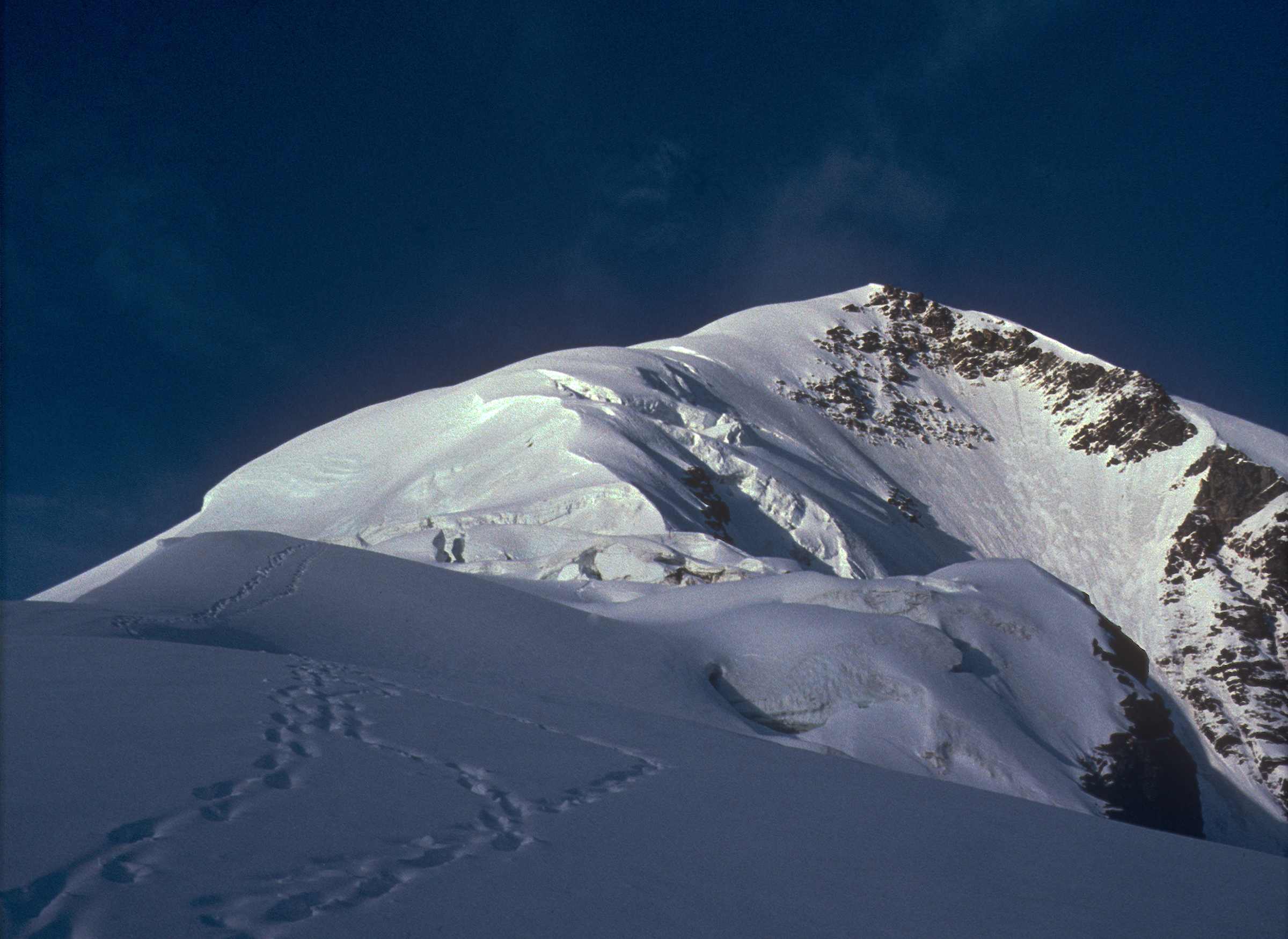
Deo Damla peak from camp3 SW ridge
