= Lohar Deo =

Mountain in Uttarakhand, India

- Location within Uttarakhand

Highest point
- Elevation: 6,245 m (20,489 ft)
- Prominence: 222 m (728 ft)
- Coordinates: 30°26′35″N 80°07′22″E

Geography
- Location: Uttarakhand, India
- Parent range: Garhwal Himalaya

Lohar Deo is a mountain of the Garhwal Himalaya in Uttarakhand, India. It is situated in the eastern rim of Nanda Devi Sanctuary on the watershed of Milam Glacier and Nanda Devi basin. The elevation of Lohar Deo is 6,245 metres (20,489 ft) and its prominence is 222 metres (728 ft). It is joint 133rd highest located entirely within the Uttrakhand. Nanda Devi, is the highest mountain in this category. Lohar Deo situated between Sakram in the south west and Bamchu on the north west. It lies 1.2 km NNE of Sakram 6,254 metres (20,518 ft). Its nearest higher neighbor Deo Damla 6,620 metres (21,719 ft) lies 2.6 km NW . Bamchu 6,303 metres (20,679 ft) lies 1.8 km NW and it is 9.9 km NE of Nanda Devi 7,816 metres (25,643 ft). It lies 11.6 km SE of Kalanka 6,931 metres (22,740 ft).

== Neighboring and subsidiary peaks ==
Neighboring or subsidiary peaks of Lohar Deo:

- Nanda Devi: 7,816 m (25,643 ft)30°55′12″N 79°35′30″E
- Rishi Pahar: 6,992 m (22,940 ft)30°31′48″N 79°59′24″E
- Bamchu: 6,303 m (20,679 ft)30°26′56″N 80°01′18″E
- Sakram 6,254 m (20,518 ft)30°25′58″N 80°02′03″E
- Rishi Kot: 6,236 m (20,459 ft)30°27′25″N 79°53′33″E
- Changabang: 6,864 m (22,520 ft)30°30′00″N 79°55′37″E
- Kalanka: 6,931 m (22,740 ft)30°30′12″N 79°56′30″E
- Saf Minal: 6,911 m (22,674 ft)30°31′43″N 79°58′01″E

== Glaciers and rivers ==
It stands between two glacier Bamchu Glacier and Sakram Glacier on the western side. Both the glacier flows down from west to east and joins Milam Glacier. Further down south east from the snout of Milam glacier emerges Goriganga River that later joins the Kali River at Jauljibi. On the western side Uttari Nanda Devi Glacier flows down north and joins Uttari Rishi Glacier from the snout of Uttari Rishi Glacier emerges Rish Ganga. Rishi Ganga met with Dhauliganga River near Rini. Later Dhauli ganga met with Alaknanda at Vishnuprayag. Alaknanda River is one of the main tributaries of river Ganga that later joins Bhagirathi River the other main tributaries of river Ganga at Devprayag and became Ganga there after.

== See also ==
- List of Himalayan peaks of Uttarakhand
