= Shipton–Tilman Nanda Devi expeditions =

Himalayan mountaineering expeditions in 1930s

Nanda Devi
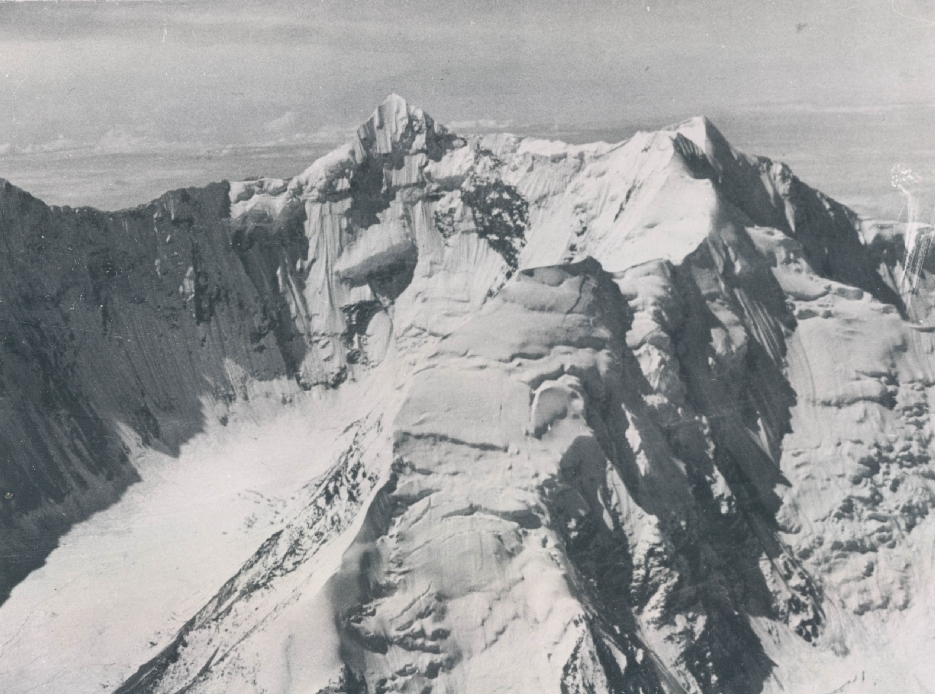
- Nanda Devi photographed in 1936

Highest point
- Elevation: 7,816 m (25,643 ft)
- Coordinates: 30°22′33″N 79°58′15″E

Naming
- Native name: नन्दा देवी (Hindi)

Geography
- Location within India
- Location: Chamoli District, Uttarakhand, India
- Parent range: Garhwal Himalaya

Climbing
- First ascent: 29 August 1936 by Noel Odell and Bill Tilman

The Shipton–Tilman Nanda Devi expeditions took place in the 1930s. Nanda Devi is a Himalayan mountain in what was then the Garhwal District in northern India, just west of Nepal, and at one time it was thought to be the highest mountain in the world.

Nanda Devi is surrounded by a ring of mountains enclosing the Sanctuary which, despite decades of attempts, no one had been able to enter. In 1934 Eric Shipton, Bill Tilman and their three accomplished Sherpas succeeded in finding a climbing route into the Sanctuary via the Rishi Ganga gorge. Then in 1936 Tilman and Noel Odell, as part of an American–British team, climbed to the 25,643-foot (7,816 m) summit, thus making Nanda Devi the highest mountain ever to have been climbed at that time.

It was only in 1950 that a higher summit was reached, when Maurice Herzog and Louis Lachenal climbed Annapurna. Nanda Devi itself was climbed for the second time in 1964.

== Summary ==
Except for the Rishi Ganga gorge to the west, Nanda Devi is encircled by a ring of mountains with no col lower than 18,000 feet (5,500 m). This mountain chain surrounds and completely encloses the Nanda Devi Sanctuary. Tom Longstaff had reached an eastern col in 1905 and had been able to see into the Sanctuary but he did not try the formidable descent. The immensely deep and narrow gorge by which the Rishi Ganga river drains the Sanctuary had never been ascended despite many attempts. However, before the 1934 monsoon, Shipton and Tilman along with three Sherpas who they regarded as co-climbers – Ang Tharkay, Pasang and Kusang – became the first people to find a way through the gorge and to set foot in the Sanctuary in what has been described as "the most exciting story in the whole saga of mountain discovery".

During their retreat from the Sanctuary for the duration of the monsoon, the 1934 expedition continued exploring by crossing the Badrinath–Kedarnath watershed for the first time, a feat that was not repeated until 1998. After the monsoon they again ascended the Rishi Ganga gorge and climbed part way up Nanda Devi's southeast ridge thereby discovering the route to the summit that was to be used in 1936. They left the Sanctuary by traversing a col to the south and making a descent that had previously been thought impossible.

In 1936 Nanda Devi became the highest mountain ever to have been climbed when a jointly-led American expedition, which eventually passed the leadership to Bill Tilman, reached its 25,643-foot (7,816 m) summit by climbing the southeast ridge. Tilman had chosen Charlie Houston and Noel Odell for the summit attempt but mischance led to Tilman rather than Houston partnering Odell to the top.

== Nanda Devi and Garhwal ==
=== 19th-century mapping ===
At the beginning of the 19th century geographers generally believed the Andes, thought to be reaching up to about 20,000 feet (6,100 m), were the highest mountains in the world. Some Himalayan peaks were measured to be higher although measurements of those in Tibet and Nepal were over very great distances from Indian territory and so were known not to be very accurate.

The Great Trigonometric Survey of India reached Himalaya early in the 19th century and because it was in the British Raj the Garhwal District (once the Garhwal Kingdom and after independence a division now in the state of Uttarakhand) was surveyed before the Nepalese and Tibetan regions. By 1820 the highest mountain to have been measured was Peak XIV in Garhwal Himalaya at 25,669 feet (7,824 m). It had the local name of Nanda Devi and it remained the highest known until 1847 when Kangchenjunga was measured. Some geographers doubted a height as great as this and thought it had been overestimated – it is now known the overestimate was only 24 feet (7.3 m). The survey also identified a ring of very high mountains encircling Nanda Devi and it identified this region, and not Lake Manasarovar, as the source of the river Ganges, or Ganga.

=== Spiritual aspects ===
Chota Char Dham sites in Uttarakhand

Hinduism and Buddhism are both important religions in the state of Uttarakhand and the two faiths have intermixed to a considerable extent. The Garhwal area had been venerated by Buddhists until they were expelled by Adi Shankara in the 9th century CE when their temples were adopted as Hindu while aspects of the two religions were merged. Badrinath Temple near the source of the Alaknanda Ganges has a style of architecture and a stone image of Vishnu that are characteristically Buddhist. The local Bhotia people had originally come from Tibet and their traditional work was to transport goods over the mountain passes between India and Tibet. Garhwal was never conquered by the Mughal Empire of India but Nepalese Gurkhas had successfully invaded. The British annexation in 1815 had little impact on the local culture. So, a very relaxed form of Hinduism developed, one which closely coexisted with Buddhism. Buddhist prayer flags sometimes adorned the Hindu temples.

The four shrines of Chota Char Dham in Garhwal are very important for Hindu pilgrims because they are at four sources of the river Ganga. However, the source of the Rishi Ganga tributary is inaccessible. Nanda Devi, the Goddess of Bliss, lived on the top of the mountain that is named after her and which is where the Seven Rishis were driven by the demons before they finally became seven stars in the sky. Nanda Devi left her mountain to live with her husband Shiva on Mount Kailash in Tibet but once a year, in October, she returns and this is a time of celebration for pilgrims.

=== Early mountaineering and exploration ===
No real attempt had been made to cross the ring of mountains enclosing Nanda Devi until 1883. In that year William Graham, who was the first climber to visit Himalaya purely for sporting purposes, attempted to reach the basin inside the protecting ring, the so-called Nanda Devi Sanctuary. The Rishi Ganga river drains the Sanctuary though an extremely deep gorge and he attempted to ascend along this route. He found the lowest part of the gorge impassable. Then, after almost reaching the summit of Dunagiri, and guided by local inhabitants, he took a route slightly north of the river and he was able to reach the gorge part way up. To the west of Nanda Devi the encircling ring becomes double with an inner ring enclosing the inner part of the Sanctuary and an outer part of the Sanctuary lying between the two ridges of the ring. By crossing the outer ring and avoiding the lower part of the gorge Graham had reached the outer part of the Sanctuary but he could not get any further.

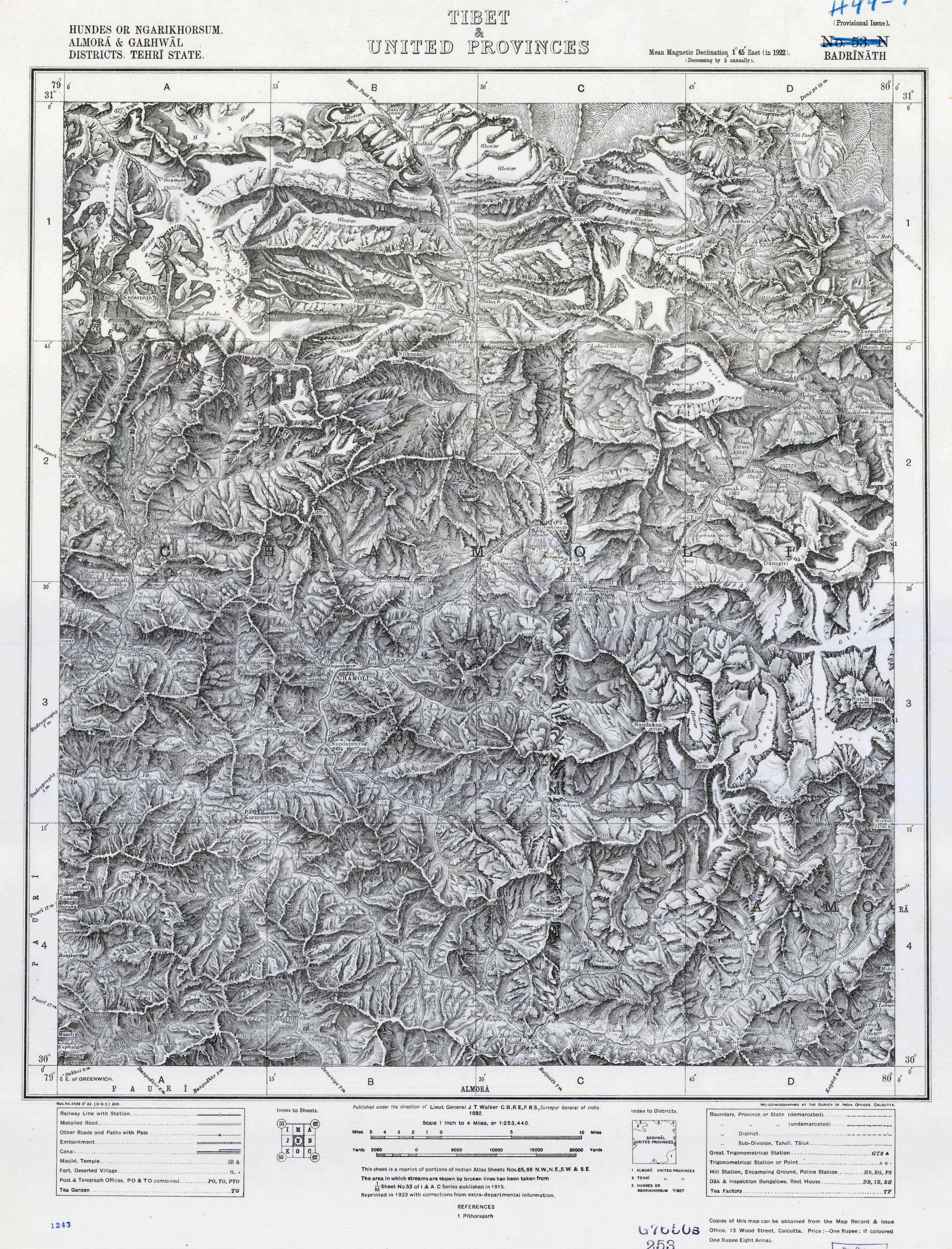
Survey of India map of Badrinath, 1882 (Nanda Devi middle right)

In 1905 Tom Longstaff and two Italian guides, the Brocherel brothers, set off to explore Nanda Devi – Longstaff's expeditions only ever involved a small number of people, each one carrying his own gear. They reached a high col just east of Nanda Devi's summit which is on the ridge of peaks surrounding the mountain itself but they were unable to descend to the Sanctuary. The Sanctuary is an area of about 250 square miles (650 km^{2}) that is encircled by a ridge nowhere less than 18,000 feet (5,500 m) in height except for the Rishi Ganga gorge which had proved to be an insuperable obstacle. The Sanctuary, completely cut off from human intrusion, had become an area of immense interest to explorers and mountaineers. Two years later the same team returned along with Charles Bruce and succeeded in climbing Trisul, southwest of the Sanctuary, and this remained the highest summit to be climbed for twenty-three years. Their attempt to get into the Sanctuary had been impeded because, according to Tilman, "though the map did credit to the maker's imagination it was apt to mislead". (Note: Tilman also said "The map of Garhwal in use up to 1936 was made from a survey in 1868 which was, rightly, only carried up to the snow-line, and above this, not so rightly, it was largely filled in by guess-work. There is nothing but praise and thankfulness for the accuracy of the surveyed portion, but for the unsurveyed part we should all prefer to have a map which, like the crew of the Snark, we can all understand, 'a perfect and absolute blank'.")

Shipton's first visit to the region (and his first visit to Himalaya) was in 1931 on an expedition led by Frank Smythe that succeeded in making the first ascent of Kamet. Shipton was in the party that reached the highest summit to have been achieved – a 25,000-foot (7,600 m) peak had never been climbed before. Subsequently, the expedition explored the mountains around Badrinath in Garhwal which, because of the beautiful flora and dramatic scenery, Shipton described as "by far the most enjoyable part of the expedition".

After Shipton's very creditable performance on the large-scale 1933 British Mount Everest expedition, he and Lawrence Wager trekked back to Darjeeling separately from the rest of the party and this experience convinced him that small expeditions could be more enjoyable than large ones and, he suspected, more successful as well. Inspired by Longstaff and attracted by Garhwal and the unexplored Rishi Ganga gorge, Shipton decided to plan his own approach to the region.

== Shipton and Tilman ==
Bill Tilman was born in 1898. He did well at school but, in 1914 with the outbreak of the Great War, he left to train for the Royal Artillery. At the age of 17 he was fighting on the Western Front where he was twice seriously wounded and was twice awarded the Military Cross. He fought and survived the Battle of Passchendaele and he was still less than 21 years old when the war was over. As part of his demobilisation he was awarded a square mile of land in British East Africa. He was lucky with his allocation and he converted his patch of bush into a successful coffee plantation.

Eric Shipton was nine years younger. Born in Ceylon but educated in Britain, he became interested in mountaineering, particularly during a snowless skiing holiday in the Alps. He turned down an opportunity to go to Cambridge University and instead took a course in estate management which set him up to become an apprentice on a coffee estate near Nairobi and within reach of Mount Kenya where he developed his mountaineering skills. Reading of this in the newspapers, Tilman wrote asking for advice and this drew the two men into a climbing partnership. So, in 1930, despite Tilman's almost complete lack of mountaineering experience, they succeeded in climbing Mount Kenya's west ridge for the first time and went on to make the first traverse of its two peaks, Batian and Neilion.

Back in Britain following his 1932 Kamet expedition, Shipton advanced his plans to again explore the Garhwal region. His initial idea was for a lightweight expedition to explore the mountainous area between the Badrinath, Kedernath and Gangotri shrines but Longstaff urged him to attempt to enter and map the Nanda Devi Sanctuary itself. Noel Humphreys, his first choice for a climbing partner, was unavailable but then a letter arrived from Tilman who had decided to visit Britain by cycling across Africa from Uganda to French Cameroon using a map torn from a magazine, and then taking a steamer to his family home near Liverpool. Tilman's letter had suggested a fortnight's rock climbing in the Lake District to which Shipton replied by inviting him on a seven-month expedition to Himalaya. Tilman accepted by return of post. In 1969 Shipton wrote that, but for the serendipity of being able to be together at the right time, the course of both their lives would have been profoundly different.

Shipton was gregarious. According to George Band, "Eric slung his ice axe beside many a memsahib's bed". Tilman was taciturn and monkish. Both men were tremendously strong and reliable; they were to become the ideal climbing partnership as they could rely on each other completely.

== 1934 expedition ==
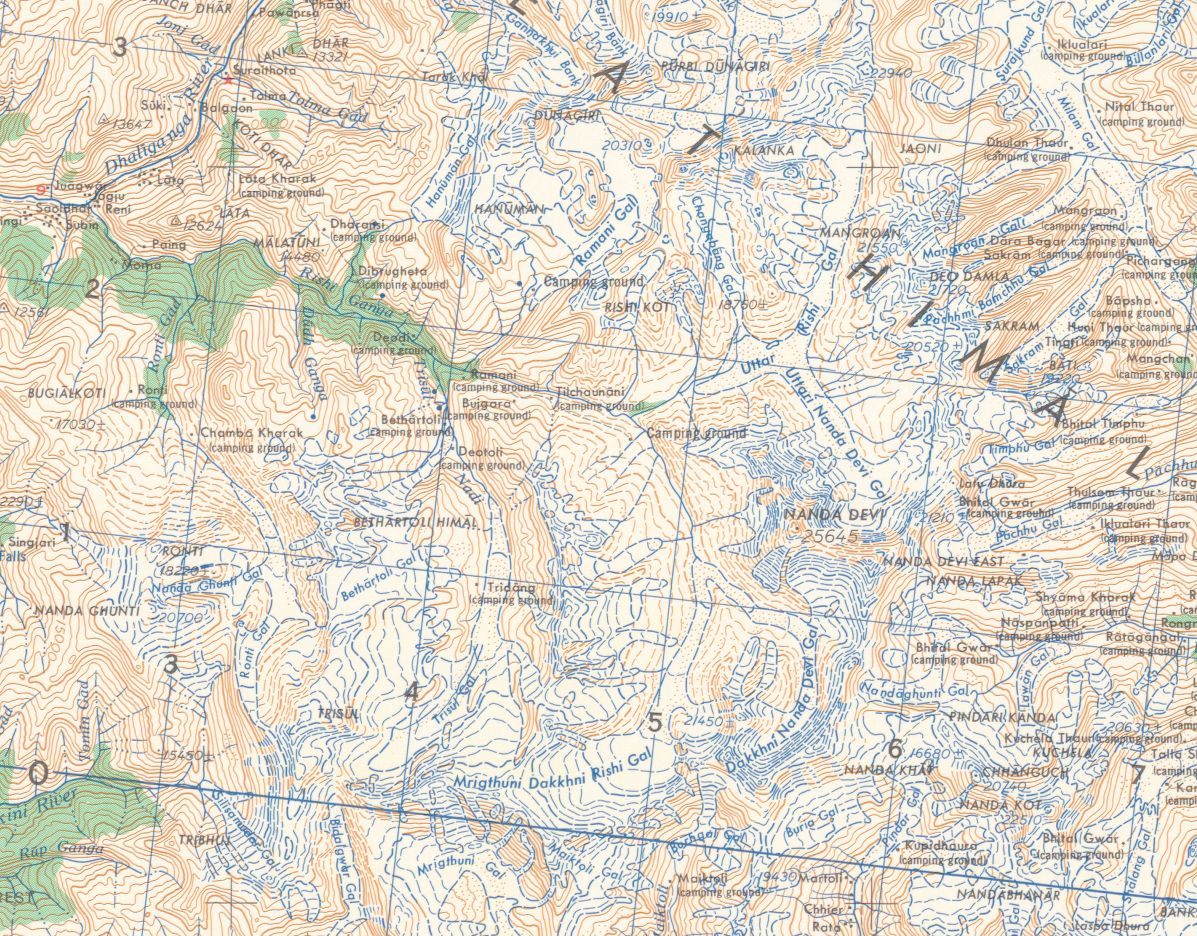
Nanda Devi and Sanctuary (1955 map)

By 1934, despite mountaineers having got near to the summit of Mount Everest, no one had even reached the foot of Nanda Devi, the highest mountain in the British Empire, even though many attempts had been made. (Note: To consider Nanda Devi the highest it is necessary to disregard Kangchenjunga on the Sikkim–Tibet border. At the time Sikkim was nominally outside the Raj.)

=== Preparations and travel ===
Locations in Uttrarkhand

Shipton asked Karma Paul, who had been on Everest expeditions since 1922, to engage three Sherpas and he appointed Ang Tharkay, Pasang Bhotia and Kusang Namgir, all of whom had been on the 1933 expedition. Equipment and supplies were basic and the plan was to eat in the same way as the Sherpas – chapatis, rice and tsampa – luxuries taken were tea, lentils and ghee. On 6 April 1934 Shipton and Tilman sailed from Liverpool on the cargo vessel SS Mahsud bound for Calcutta. They met the Sherpas who had travelled from Darjeeling and the five men went by train to Kathgodam and continued by lorry to Ranikhet where they arrived on 9 May. (Note: A photograph of the five men is available at "Bill Tilman: Nepal's very first trekking tourist". 7 January 2015. Archived from the original on 16 August 2018.) They arranged to take on a dozen Doti porters, purchased food at the market and were driven by lorry to Baijnath where they were met by the porters. A ten-day trek took them to Joshimath from where the exploration towards the Sanctuary started.

=== Through the upper Rishi Ganga gorge ===
Using the route discovered by Graham, they followed the Dhauli river, passing the foot of the Rishi Ganga gorge, and climbed the Lata hills north of the gorge to reach a trig station set up by the Survey of India, the last in the area. This served as the basis for their own surveying which they saw as one of their main purposes. They traversed the Duraishi and Dibrughita high grazing areas (Note: From the village of Lata the route goes to Lata Kharak, Dharansi Pass, Duraishi and Dibrughita all the time navigating by keeping an eye open for Dunagiri.) and descended to just below the confluence of the Rhamani and the Rishi rivers, halfway up the gorge and eight days march from Joshimath. Base camp was set up near the confluence of the two rivers and here the porters were paid off. At this point the gorge is a box canyon for a distance of about 2 miles (3 km) with walls rising 10,000 feet (3,000 m) above the river. The five men relayed five hundredweight (250 kg) of supplies along the perilous cliffs, sometimes overhanging the river, at various heights above the bed of the gorge but in doing so lost a rucksack with nearly all their lentils, which removed their staple food and would reduce their expedition by two days. For seven days they ascended the upper gorge, repeatedly being forced to cross and re-cross the river.

On 4 June they reached an impasse on the north bank so Tilman and Ang Tharkay reconnoitred a buttress to the south which appeared to be insurmountable. From the north bank they appeared "like ants on a gigantic wall" but at the end of the day they returned to camp having found a clear path beyond the buttress. They named the location "Pisgah" because from there they could see the summit of Nanda Devi. (Note: It was from Mount Pisgah that Moses could see the Promised Land.) Two days later the team became the first people to enter the Sanctuary. They had taken nine days to cover four miles and success had always been in doubt.

=== Exploring the Sanctuary ===
Sketch map of expeditions' routes in 1934 and 1936

The monsoon was expected in about three weeks and the gorge would then be completely closed with floods so their exploration of the Sanctuary could only be brief. They had difficulty crossing the Rishi – at this point is the confluence of a northern and southern arm at a height of about 13,100 feet (4,000 m). To the north the river emerges from a large glacier and it was in this direction they started their survey. They saw for the first time the vast northern face of Nanda Devi – an unbroken sweep of 9,000 feet (2,700 m). They reached the rim of the northeastern encircling mountains at over 20,000 feet (6,100 m) and looked over to the east to the Milam Glacier hoping there might be an alternative way out of the Sanctuary. They also went to the northernmost part of the ring but while they were exploring the foothills of Changabang the weather deteriorated and the Sherpas effectively took the lead when both Europeans were ill. On 24 June the monsoon arrived and they started their retreat, urged on by the Sherpas. In heavy rain they descended the gorge to the Rhamani river in two days. This river had become torrential and they were forced upstream to where they found an easy crossing point and a route back to Dibrughita from where they raced back to civilisation. In a letter Shipton wrote of the Sanctuary "There was a tremendous variety of birds and any amount of game – most of which can never have seen a man, and stared at us incredulously. I was glad we did not have guns – it would have been a crime to shoot them. It was perhaps the most wonderful three weeks of my life, and I shall never forget a moment of it...".

=== Badrinath–Gaumukh crossing ===
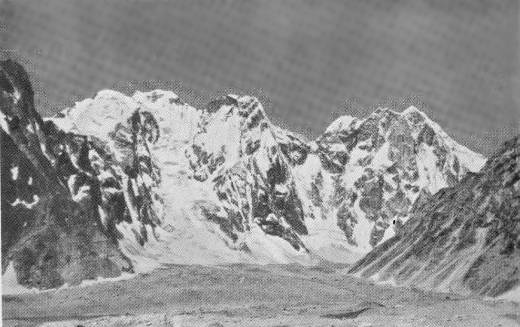
Bhagirath Kharak: enclosing wall and head of glacier tributary

Back at Joshimath on 2 July and expecting travel through the gorge would not be possible before 10 August, they embarked on a crossing from Badrinath to Gaumukh. The sources of the three main rivers that together form the Ganges: the Bhagirathi, Mandakini and Alaknanda, each have temples – Gangotri, Kedarnath and Badrinath – that are the destinations for Hindu pilgrims. This region is very mountainous and the watershed had never been crossed. Leaving Joshimah for Badrinath, the party hired porters and set off on 12 July for the Bhagirath Kharak glacier. (Note: Shipton calls the Bhagirath Kharak glacier the "Bhagat Kharak".) Finding there was no pass at the head of the glacier they explored four subsidiary glaciers entering from the south-west but none were passable. Instead, they headed north to the Arwa River – climbing a 21,500-foot (6,600 m) peak on the way – to where a previous expedition had reached the watershed but had not completed a traverse. The team found a way over the watershed and, guided by the sight of Shivling, descended the Chaturangi Glacier (Note: Shipton refers to the Chaturangi Glacier as "'X' glacier") to the snout of the Gangotri Glacier at Gaumukh. With insufficient food to include Gangotri on their itinerary, they returned to Badrinath via the Arwa valley.

=== Badrinath–Kedarnath crossing ===
Sketch map of Badrinath – Gaukukh, and Badrinath – Kedernath routes

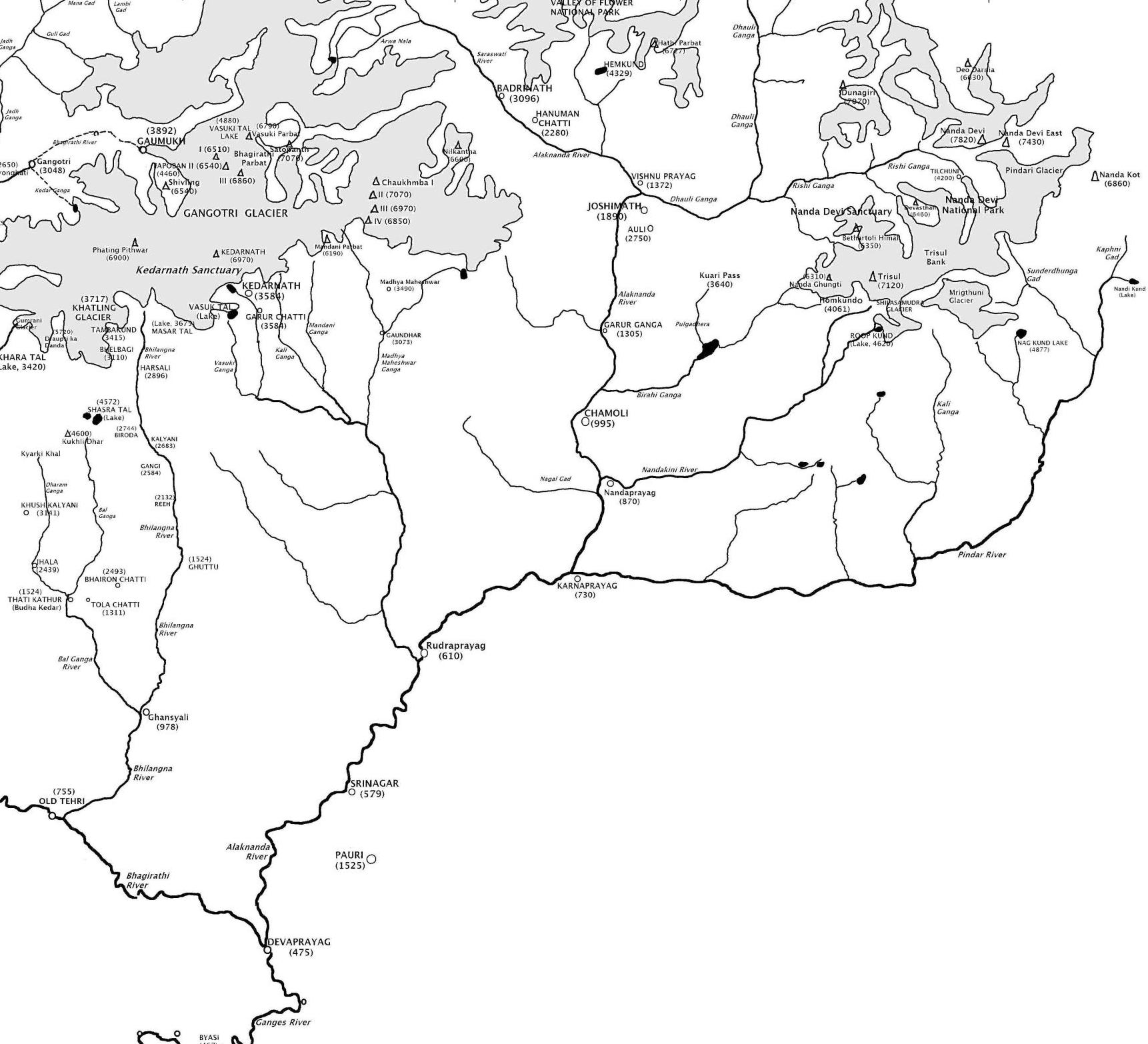
Headwaters of the Ganges

There was a legend of a high priest who used to hold services in the Badrinath and Kedernath temples both on the same day. Tradition told that, to avoid the hundred-mile journey using known tracks, he would take a shortcut over the mountains, a distance of less than three miles. (Note: Shipton says the distance is at least twenty-four miles.) Wanting to explore this crossing, the party set off up the Satopanth Glacier on 4 August, knowing it would delay their return to the Sanctuary. It took difficult route-finding and awkward climbing on ice to reach the head of the glacier. Eventually they were able to see to the west of the divide to discover that they were at the head of the Kedarnath valley (as Tilman had predicted) and not the Gangotri Glacier (as Shipton had expected). Immediately they were faced by an ice precipice of hundreds of feet with ice pinnacles and crevasses. Shipton and Tilman felt they might have to turn back but the Sherpas were determined and eventually it was Ang Tharkay who found a route down, albeit a most difficult one.

What they presumed would be a two-day trek to Kedarnath turned out to be a far more serious journey. There was a precipice of 2,200 feet (670 m), scrub and jungle that had to be cut through, and rivers that were almost impossible to cross. Eventually, and after over a week, they reached villages where they could get food but when they reached the pilgrims' road to Kedarnath they decided there was no time to go north on the trail to the temple and they turned south instead, taking the pilgrim route back to Joshimath.

=== The Sanctuary revisited ===
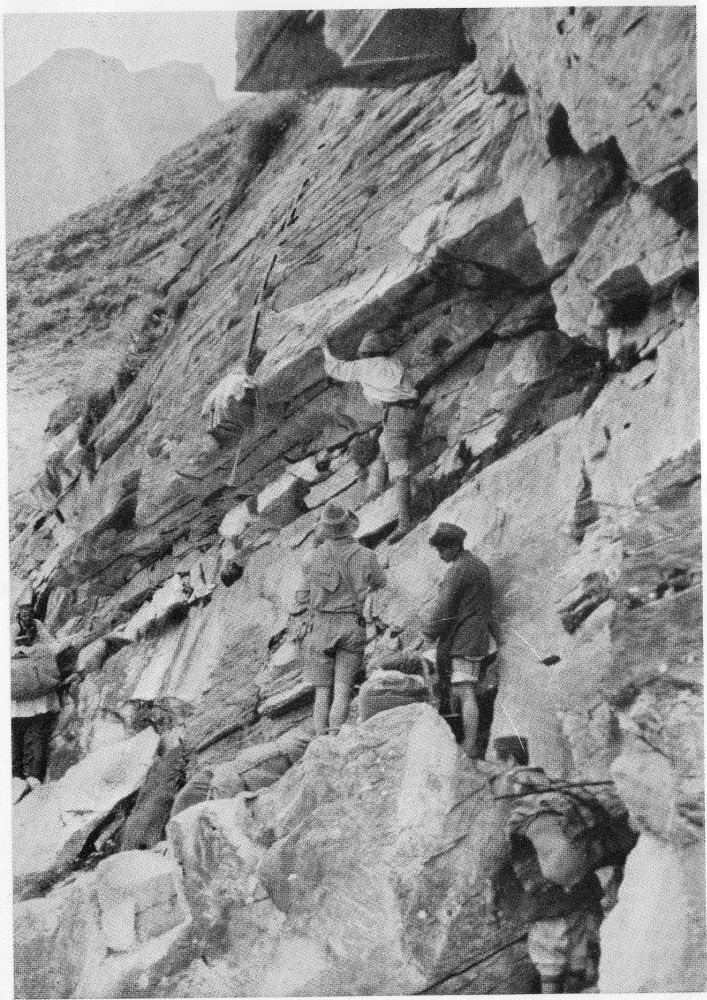
Hauling loads below the "Pisgah" buttress in the Rishi Ganga gorge

They left Joshimath on 30 August with a group of porters they had hired locally, at Mana. So enthusiastic were the porters that thirteen accompanied the team up the Rishi Ganga gorge and into the Sanctuary itself. Shipton "came to have a considerable respect for them as cragsmen" and was sorry that they had to leave. This time the team explored the southern part of the basin especially looking for a way out over the rim so as to avoid a fourth passage of the gorge.

It would be difficult to give an adequate description of the loveliness of the country in which we found ourselves. Beauty of the wild, riotous kind such as one usually finds in high mountain regions we had expected; but we found, as well, luxuriant pasture, brilliant with wild flowers, and lakes, on whose deep blue and green surfaces was reflected the crusts of icy peaks; birds of great variety and brilliant colours, and large herds of thar and bharal, which were so tame and regarded these strange new visitors with such curiosity, that I was almost glad we had not brought a rifle.

— Eric Shipton, Illustrated London News, 12 January 1935

The col discovered by Longstaff in 1905 seemed less suitable than one further south, spotted by Hugh Ruttledge in 1932. However they were distracted by Trisul East (now called Maiktoli, 22,320 feet (6,800 m)) which looked technically straightforward so, while Tilman continued surveying with Pasang, the other three made the first ascent of the peak in conditions, according to Shipton, "almost up to Everest standards". The three men had to share a two-man tent so, at night, when one turned they all had to. The Sherpas found this tremendously funny – Shipton less so. On their return, Shipton and Tilman explored a subsidiary ridge to the south ridge of Nanda Devi itself merely thinking it might provide a good view of the southern Sanctuary. At 20,500 feet (6,200 m) they had to turn back but they had decided that this ridge gave a good chance of reaching the summit for a suitably prepared expedition. On 17 September the entire party started the climb to Ruttledge's col to look down the 6,000 feet (1,800 m) precipice and icefall to the Sunderdhunga Glacier. It took two days to discover a route down the precipice and Ang Tharkay was the person who found the way that was at last successful. Descending the valley they reached the Pindar River. At last reaching Sameswar they were able to board a bus to Ranikhet and they went their separate ways at Bareilly with Shipton writing his book Nanda Devi on his six-week voyage home.

== Mount Everest intervenes ==
The Royal Geographical Society's reception of Shipton's February 1935 Nanda Devi presentation was "close to rapturous" and of particular note was that the full cost of the entire expedition had been 287 pounds sterling (Note: The 1933 expedition and the 1936 expedition to Mount Everest each cost over £10,000.) (equivalent to £22,800 in 2024). Shipton and Tilman were both lauded by the top brass of the RGS but there was no support for any immediate return to Nanda Devi because Tibet had just given permission for attempts on Mount Everest in 1935 and 1936. With the RGS only having £1,400 (equivalent to £111,000 in 2024) readily available, it was inevitable that a 1935 British Mount Everest reconnaissance expedition was immediately launched with Shipton and Tilman at the helm as a precursor to a full attempt in 1936. The reconnaissance was a conspicuous success so Shipton was again appointed to the team for 1936, but not as leader due to Machiavellian RGS politics. In 1935 Tilman had not acclimatised well to altitude over 20,000 feet (6,100 m) so he was dropped from the 1936 team, with his agreement. (Note: Tilman had had similar difficulties on Nanda Devi but it had not seemed to be a serious problem.)

== British–American Himalayan Expedition, 1936 ==
=== Background ===
Four American students from Harvard Mountaineering Club – Farnie Loomis, Charlie Houston, Art Emmons and Ad Carter – had decided on a lightweight Himalayan expedition, possibly to Kanchenjunga. They had never been to Himalaya; it was an unclimbed peak – the third-highest in the world – and if they succeeded it would be the first eight-thousander to be climbed.

At Loomis' suggestion, they decided to get support from experienced British climbers so they invited Thomas Graham Brown, a friend of Houston, who accepted the invitation to join in. He extended the invitation to Shipton, who was unavailable because of the 1936 Everest expedition, and to Tilman, who accepted. Noel Odell and Peter Lloyd also agreed to be part of the British contingent. Loomis went to London to purchase equipment where he was advised that Nanda Devi might be a more achievable option. Tilman, however, personally favoured Kanchenjunga. The Americans changed the expedition's name from the "Harvard Kanchenjunga Expedition" to the "British–American Himalayan Expedition". Later, in 1999, Houston wrote, "It's hard to believe how naïve and presumptuous we were ... Four American college kids ... inviting the best British climbers on a major climb in the Himalayas". Houston was being self-effacing – although young, the Americans were accomplished mountaineers and formed a very cohesive team.

Tilman went ahead to Calcutta where, after being refused permission for Kanchenjunga, he prepared for Nanda Devi instead. With many Himalayan expeditions under way the choice of Sherpas was limited – Tilman chose Pasang Kikuli and Pasang Phuta with whom he travelled to Ranikhet, and arranged for four more Sherpas to find their own way there. (Note: Tilman names the other four Sherpas as Nuri, Da Namgyal, Nima Tsering and Kitar. When he refers to "Pasang" he implies Pasang Kikuli.) They joined up with Loomis at Ranikhet and wired ahead to Joshimath for food supplies and for fifteen porters from Mana with the intention of taking some food supplies up the Rishi Ganga gorge in advance of the main party. By 16 June 1936 they had together hauled 900 pounds (410 kg) to beyond Pisgah and had then returned to Badrinath. A few days later the entire party came together and they set off for the Sanctuary. Trouble came when the porters would not go beyond Rhamani and the Sherpas all became ill (Kitar was to die three weeks later) and it was left to the sahibs to carry the supplies through the Sanctuary towards the mountain and up its foothills.

=== Ascent of Nanda Devi ===
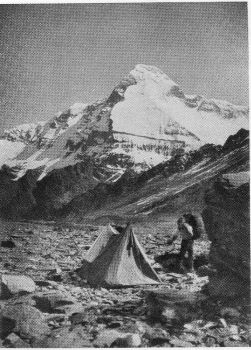
Nanda Devi from the south (1934)

A camp they called Moraine Camp was established at 15,000 feet (4,600 m) at the foot of the western slopes of Nanda Devi and juniper wood was taken here for fuel so that paraffin could be saved for the actual ascent. Pleased with progress, after supper Loomis produced a flask of apricot brandy he had kept hidden so everyone celebrated. Base camp was on shale at the top of scree slopes leading to the subsidiary ridge to the mountain's south ridge (discovered in 1934) and it was stocked with at least three weeks' food and fuel. Camp one was at 19,200 feet (5,900 m) but it had to be on four small separate platforms dug out from the deep snow that had been falling. Tilman was very impressed with how everyone was acclimatising. With considerable difficulty due to continuing snowfall, camp two was established on 14 August at about 20,400 feet (6,200 m).and then camp three at about 21,400 feet (6,500 m).

The logistics of moving people and supplies between the various small camps had become too difficult to handle with communal decisions. Therefore, it was agreed to have a secret ballot to choose a named leader. Tilman was chosen and, after delays caused by a blizzard, he decided on a summit team of Houston and Odell who, with the others in support, climbed to 23,400 feet (7,100 m) where they set up a precarious camp. The next day Houston and Odell climbed strongly but they realised they would not reach the summit that day so they retreated to their bivouac camp where Houston ate meat which had become contaminated so that he was unable to continue on the climb. Odell called down the mountain "Charlie is ill" but the American Carter who heard the shout, not well-attuned to Odell's posh English accent, misheard the message as "Charlie is killed". (Note: Tilman wrote of "Odell's familiar yodel, like a donkey braying.) A very sorrowful party set off on the six-hour journey to retrieve the corpse with Tilman the only person taking his full climbing kit. When they arrived they were greeted by a cheerful Odell calling "Hello, you blokes, have some tea".

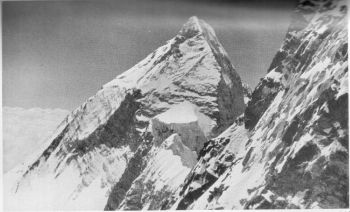
Nanda Devi from the east, showing the ridge, left, ascended (1939 photo)

Houston insisted on going down to allow someone else to take his place at the bivouac and, because Tilman was the only person fully equipped, he joined Odell in moving the tent up to an upper bivouac at 24,000 feet (7,300 m) so that on 29 August 1936 in eight hours they were able to ascend to the summit in cold, fine weather. They had reached the top of the highest mountain ever climbed – 25,643 feet (7,816 m). Tilman, who was a very reticent individual but who also had a wry sense of humour, wrote self-mockingly "I believe we so far forgot ourselves as to shake hands on it". Lloyd would have been able to take part in a second bid for the summit but everyone else either had frostbite or had already gone back down the mountain. They descended to be told that Kitar had died and the Sherpas had already built a cairn over his grave.

Most of the party set off down the gorge but, as an additional challenge, Tilman, Houston and Pasang Kikuli traversed Longstaff's 1905 col and descended to Martoli and then south down the Milam valley eventually reaching Ranikhet.

Tilman wrote, "I remember, in the small hours when the spark of life burns lowest, the feeling which predominated over all was one of remorse at the fall of a giant. It is the same sort of contrition that one feels at the shooting of an elephant".

== Osmaston–Shipton 1936 expedition ==
Knowing of Shipton's 1934 explorations, Gordon Osmaston, director of the Survey of India's triangulation of Great Himalaya, planned to improve the survey of the Sanctuary using a phototheodolite. As he set off from Darjeeling he met Shipton returning from the Everest expedition. Shipton immediately agreed to join the Osmaston's party, hoping to join up with Tilman's Nanda Devi climbers. Ang Tharkay and Tenzing Norgay also joined as Sherpas. They met Lloyd who was descending the Rishi Ganga gorge ahead of the main party and so heard that the mountain had just been climbed. Writing to a friend Shipton said "What a glorious effort of Bill and Odell to have climbed Nanda Devi. I am overjoyed that it was Bill who did the touchdown – he so thoroughly deserves every inch of his success [...] I confess I wished I had been with them instead of wasting time on that ridiculous Everest business". He also said "By Jove, it will shake the old fools at home", referring to the RGS Mount Everest Committee and the fact that the expedition had been conceived in the United States.

Osmaston surveyed the Sanctuary's northern glacier while Shipton explored the Changabang glacier. While Osmaston turned to the southern glacier, Shipton descended the Rishi Ganga gorge, made a failed attempt on Dunagiri, crossed the Bagini Pass and descended the Bagini glacier to the north. Returning to Joshimath he took up a phototheodolite and went south to survey the Rinti glacier and the saddle between Trisul and Nanda Ghunti.

== Subsequent events ==
It was only in 1950 that a higher summit than Nanda Devi was reached when on the French Annapurna expedition Maurice Herzog and Louis Lachenal climbed Annapurna I, 26,545 feet (8,091 m), the first 8,000-metre peak to be climbed. Ang Tharkay was the expedition's sirdar. Nanda Devi's main peak was climbed for the second time in 1964. The Badrinath–Kedarnath watershed was crossed for the second time in 1998 by a group including Shipton's son John Shipton.
