= Saf Minal =

Mountain in Himalayas, India

- Location within Uttarakhand

Highest point
- Elevation: 6,911 m (22,674 ft)
- Prominence: 639 m (2,096 ft)
- Coordinates: 30°31′43″N 79°58′01″E

Geography
- Location: Uttarakhand, India
- Parent range: Garhwal Himalaya

Climbing
- First ascent: The first ascent by J. Imai and A. Hagiwara from Japan in On 2 October 1975.

Saf Minal (Hindi: सफ़ मिनाल) is a mountain of Garhwal Himalaya in Uttarakhand India. Saf Minal standing majestically at 6911 meter 22674 feet. It's the 21st highest located entirely within the uttrakhand India. Nanda Devi, is the highest mountain in this category and 50th highest peak in India. Saf Minal is the 332nd highest peak in the world. Saf Minal falls on the edge of the Northern Nanda Devi National Park.

== Climbing history ==
Saf Minal (6911m) lies on the outer rim of the Nanda Devi sanctuary and just west of Rishi Pahar. The first ascent by Himalayan Alpine Association of Japan in 1975 through the south east ridge from inside the Nanda Devi National Park. On 2 October, J. Imai and A. Hagiwara reached the summit after 8 hour of climbing at 1.30 p.m. The second ascent came in on October 5, 2004 by an American-British team Ian Parnel and John Varco (US) climbed the northwest face of Saf Minal this is the first ascent of the northwest face of Saf Minal.

== Glaciers and rivers ==
It is surrounded by Glaciers on both the side Uttari Rishi Glacier, on the southern side and Bagini Glacier on the northern side. The River from Bagini Glacier met with Dhauli Ganga at Jumma. Changabang Bamak (Glacier) and Uttari Rishi Bamak (Glacier) also met Dhauli Ganga through Rishi Ganga gorge. later Dhauli Ganga met with Alaknanda river at Vishnu Prayag two main tributaries of Ganga. These two main rivers meet at Devprayag and became Ganga thereafter.

The entire surrounding area are protected within the 2,236.74 km^{2} (863.61 sq mi) Nanda Devi National Park or Nanda Devi Biosphere Reserve which is a World Heritage Site declared by UNESCO . The Nanda Devi National Park is home to several world-class treks.

== Neighboring peaks ==
The neighboring peaks of Saf Minal:

- Nanda Devi: 7,816 m (25,643 ft)30°22′33″N 79°58′15″E
- Dunagiri: 7,066 m (23,182 ft)30°30′54″N 79°52′00″E
- Rishi Pahar: 6,992 m (22,940 ft)30°31′48″N 79°59′24″E
- Kalanka: 6,932 m (22,743 ft)30°30′12″N 79°56′30″E
- Changabang: 6,864 m (22,520 ft)30°30′00″N 79°55′37″E

== See also ==
- List of Himalayan peaks of Uttarakhand
- Gangotri National Park
- Nanda Devi National Park
