= Nanda Devi and Valley of Flowers National Parks =

UNESCO World Heritage Site
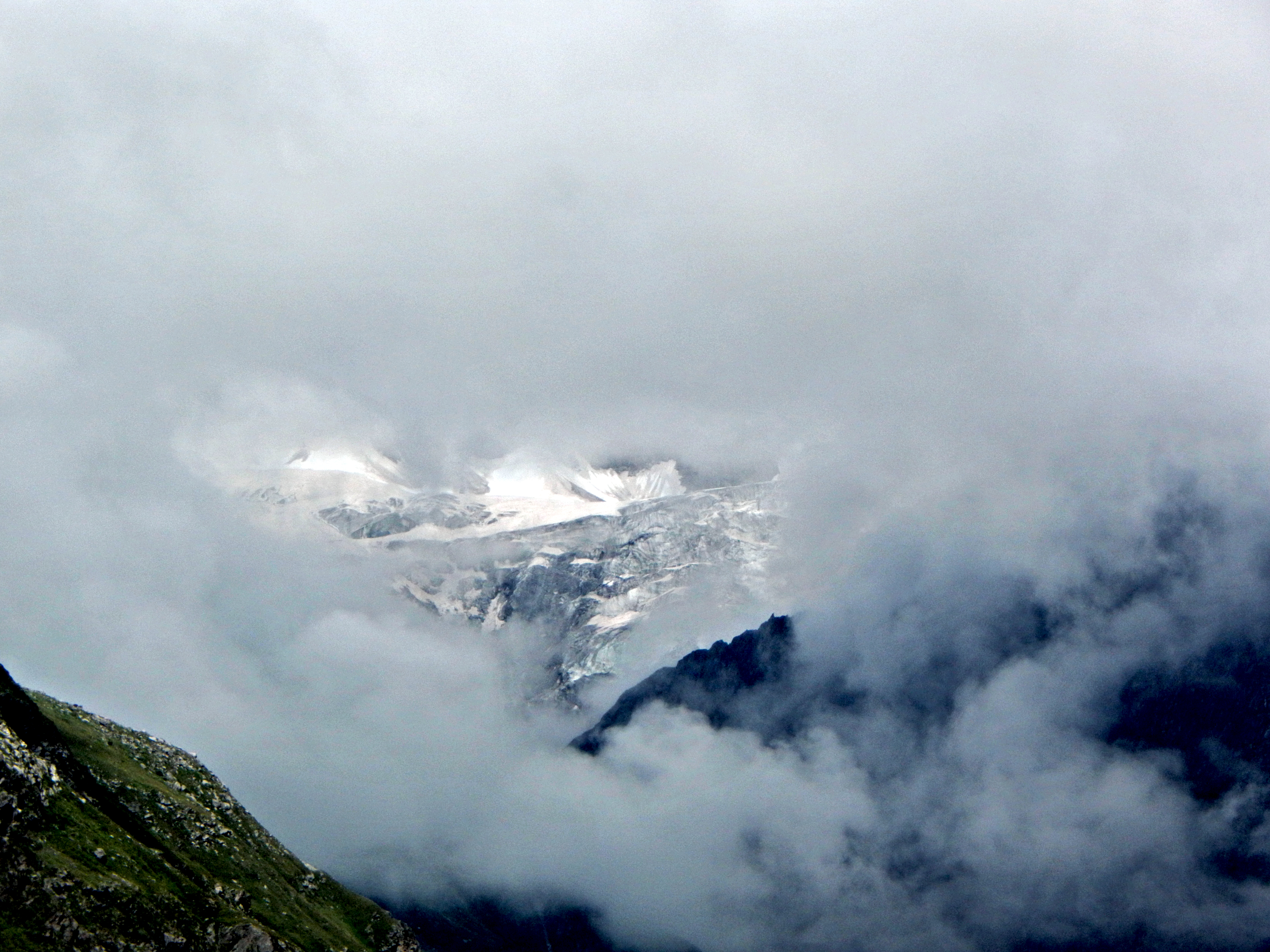
- Glimpse of Nanda Devi amidst the clouds from Valley of Flowers

- Location within India
- Location: Chamoli district, Uttarakhand, India
- Includes: 1. Nanda Devi National Park; 2. Valley of Flowers National Park
- Criteria: Natural: (vii), (x)
- Reference: 335bis
- Inscription: 1988 (12th Session)
- Extensions: 2005
- Area: 71,783 ha (277.16 sq mi)
- Buffer zone: 514,286 ha (1,985.67 sq mi)
- Coordinates: 30°43′N 79°40′E

The Nanda Devi National Park and Valley of Flowers National Parks is a UNESCO World Heritage Site in Uttarakhand, India. It possesses of two core areas about 20 km apart, made up by the Nanda Devi National Park and the Valley of Flowers National Park, plus an encompassing Combined Buffer Zone.

In 1988, the site was inscribed as Nanda Devi National Park (India). In 2005, it was expanded to encompass the Valley of Flowers National Park and a larger buffer zone and it was renamed to Nanda Devi and Valley of Flowers National Parks.

The areas of the site are

- 630.33 km^{2} (243.37 sq mi) - Nanda Devi National Park core area
- 87.50 km^{2} (33.78 sq mi) - Valley of Flowers National Park core area
- 5,148.57 km^{2} (1,987.87 sq mi) - Buffer zone
