= Vishnuprayag Dam =

- Location within Uttarakhand Location within India
- Country: India
- Location: Chamoli District
- Coordinates: 30.5669°N 79.5468°E
- Status: Operational
- Opening date: 2013
- Construction cost: Rs. 1900 Crore
- Owner: Jaiprakash Power Ventures Limited

Dam and spillways
- Type of dam: Embankment
- Impounds: Alaknanda River
- Height: 1,372 m (4,501 ft)

The Vishnuprayag Dam lies in Chamoli district at the confluence of Alaknanda River and Dhauliganga River, in the Indian state of Uttarakhand, India.

== Geography ==
The geographical coordinates of this dam are 30.34°N 79.34°E. From the mean sea level, the dam has an average altitude of 1372 meters. This river engenders from the snow-flecked mountain peak of the Chowkhambha mountain, according to geographical location.

== Vishnuprayag Hydroelectric Project ==
It is located in Uttarakhand. The accurate location of this project is near to the hanuman Chatti. This project included 17 m high concrete flexion dam, a tunnel of 4 meters, desilting compartments, a steel lined pressure knob of 1491 meter long.

An efficiency of 40 MV power producing HydroElectric plant is situated on this site. At the power plant, two small units of 20 MV (each) capacity have been installed. There is no problem in the supply of water on normal days. As the water supply increases during the rainy season, the electricity production is also increases. In the form of barrage 10 gates have been built at the place, to regulate the water discharge. By each unit of the plant, more than that of 327 CUSEC water is employed. In the production of electricity the support of nature is very helpful, so that the target of 409MW electricity production is never diminishes. Later, JAYPEE group of Industries taken over this project.

== See also ==
- List of power stations in India
