= Rishi Kot =

Mountain in Uttarakhand, India

- Location within Uttarakhand

Highest point
- Elevation: 6,236 m (20,459 ft)
- Prominence: 436 m (1,430 ft)
- Coordinates: 30°27′25″N 79°53′33″E

Geography
- Location: Uttarakhand, India
- Parent range: Garhwal Himalaya

Climbing
- First ascent: In 1968 N.D.A. Khadakvasla Led by Ft. Lt. V.P. Singh.

Rishi Kot is a mountain of the Garhwal Himalaya in Uttarakhand India. Rishi Kot means “the Rishis’ fortress”. The elevation of Rishi Kot is 6,236 metres (20,459 ft) and its prominence is 436 metres (1,430 ft). It is 134th joint highest located entirely within the Uttrakhand. Nanda Devi, is the highest mountain in this category. It lies 5.7 km SW of Changabang 6,864 metres (22,520 ft) its nearest higher neighbor and 7.1 km south of Dunagiri 7,066 metres (23,182 ft). Bethartoli 6,393 metres (20,974 ft) lies 13.4 km SW and 11.7 km SSE lies Nanda Devi 7,816 metres (25,643 ft).

== Climbing history ==
In 1968 N.D.A. Khadakvasla venture in to the Nanda Devi Sanctuary in Kumaon Himalaya. Led by Ft. Lt. V.P. Singh. They climbed three different peaks in the Rhamani Glacier. One of them is Rishi Kot climbed by the third party led by Lt. Mohindra the other members in the team are Nanda, Bhasin, Randhawa, Roy, Sherpa Instructor Pasang Temba, Sherpa Mingma Wangdi and four porters they summits on June 14. The three peaks were named Dl, D2 and D3 by the expedition team D3 is already marked on the Survey of India Sheet 53 as Rishi Kot. 11

A Polish team climbed northwest face of Rishi Kot, on September 9, 1979. Tadeusz Karolczak and Ryszard Pawlowski made the first ascent of northwest face of the ice-covered Rishi Kot (6236 meters, 20,460 feet). A technically difficult and steep, 5000 ft high wall. The alpine-style climb took them 16 hours to reach the summit, reaching ten P.M. The pair spent the night on the summit. Descending the next morning to Base Camp. Chris Bonington and Dougal Haston during their 1974 Changabang expedition attempted the impressive ice-face on the W side had nearly climbed but retreated several hundred meters below the summit. In 1978 the Brown University expedition also unsuccessfully attempted this face.

== Glaciers and rivers ==
Ramani Glacier on the northern side and Rishikot Glacier and Changabang Glacier on the eastern side. All these glacier drains into Rishi Ganga. Rishi Ganga meets with Dhauli Ganga near Rini. Later Dhauli ganga met with Alaknanda at Vishnu Pryag. Alaknanda River is one of the main tributaries of river Ganga that later joins Bhagirathi River the other main tributaries of river Ganga at Dev Pryag and became Ganga there after.

== Neighboring peaks ==
Neighboring peaks of Maiktoli:

- Nanda Devi: 7,816 m (25,643 ft)30°55′12″N 79°35′30″E
- Trisul: 7,120 m (23,360 ft)30°18′36″N 79°46′12″E
- Changabang: 6,864 m (22,520 ft)30°30′00″N 79°55′37″E
- Devistan I: 6,678 m (21,909 ft)30°20′24″N 79°52′48″E
- Devtoli: 6,788 m (22,270 ft)30°17′09″N 79°51′12″E
- Maiktoli: 6,803 m (22,320 ft)30°16′24″N 79°52′18″E

== See also ==
- List of Himalayan peaks of Uttarakhand
