= Vishnuprayag =

Confluence of India's Alaknanda and Dhauliganga rivers

Coordinates: 30°33′45″N 79°34′31″E

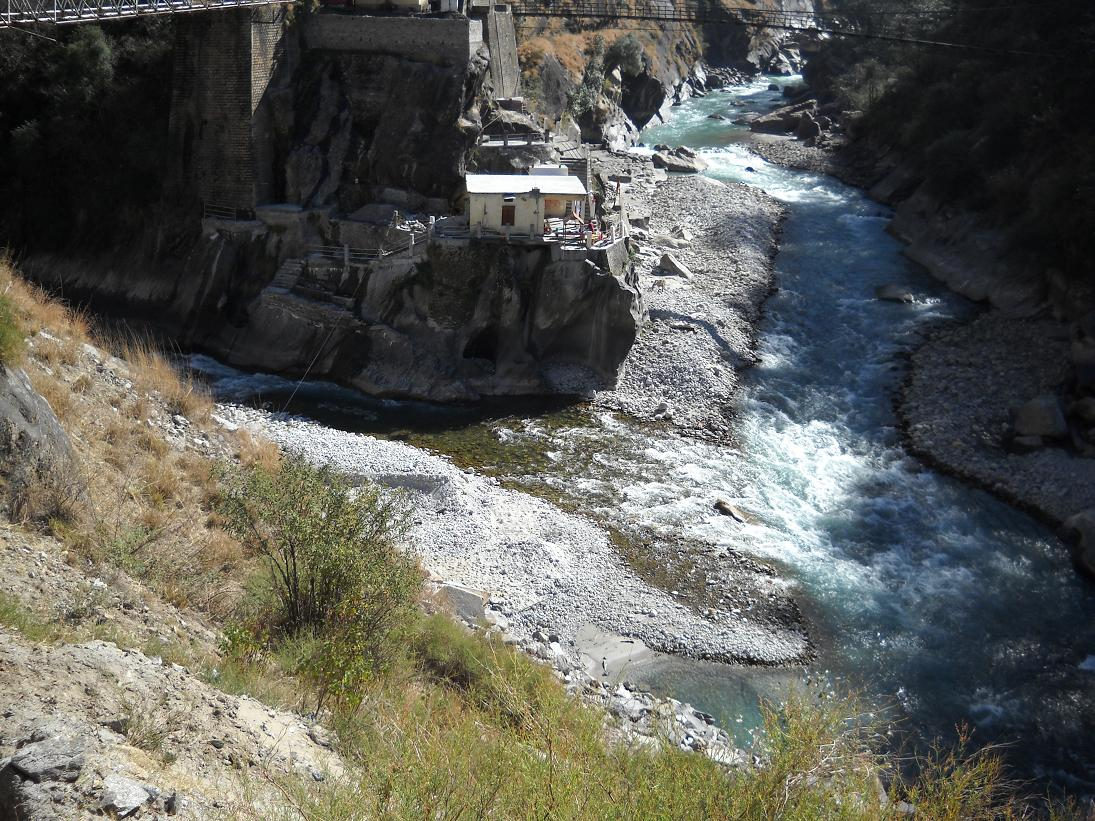
Confluence of the Dhauliganga (right) with the Alaknanda (left) at Vishnuprayag

Vishnuprayāg is the confluence of India's Alaknanda and Dhauliganga rivers—the first of five major confluences of the Alakanda known as the Panch Prayag. It is located at an elevation of 1,372 metres (4,501 ft) in the Chamoli district in the state of Uttarakhand.

Vishnuprayāg derives its name from Vishnu, reflecting a belief that it is the place where the sage Narada meditated and offered to worship to god Vishnu, after which Vishnu appeared before him.

Nearby points of interest include the Vishnuprayag Dam, Kagbhusandi Lake, and Hanuman Chatti, a temple dedicated to the god Hanuman.

== See also ==
- Nandaprayag
- Rudraprayag
- Devprayag
- Karnaprayag
