= Milam Glacier =

Glacier in Uttarakhand, India

Milam
- Location within Uttarakhand Location within India
- Interactive map of Milam
- Type: Mountain glacier
- Location: Pithoragarh district Kumaon Himalayas, Uttarakhand, India
- Coordinates: 30°29′N 80°06′E

Milam Glacier is a major glacier of Himalaya in the Munsiyari tehsil of Pithoragarh district of Kumaon region in the Uttrakhand state of India. The Milam village, near the snout of Milam Glacier, is the source of the Goriganga River which flows to Munsiyari through the Johar Valley inhabited by Shauka Tibeto-Burman ethnic people. Munsiari-Bugdiar-Milam Road (MBMR), the paved motorable road being constructed by the BRO as part of the India–China Border Roads (ICBRs) with expected completion date of March 2026, provides access to Milam village and glacier from the district sub-division headquarter Munsiyari.

Munsiyari, further down the Goriganga valley, was the traditional base for the trek to the glacier before the construction of the road. The suitable time to visit the glacier is from mid-March to May. Monsoon usually sets in during the month of June which herald the menace of landslides and roadblocks making the trek inadvisable.

== History ==
Milam glacier was closed in 1962, making it inaccessible for trekkers and other visitors, but reopened in the year 1994 presently making it a popular destination among trekkers.

== Geography ==
Milam Glacier, covering around 37 km^{2} (14 sq mi) area of 16 km (10 mi) length, is located about 15 kilometres (9 mi) northeast of Nanda Devi. It ranges in elevation from about 5,500 metres (18,000 ft) to about 3,870 metres (12,700 ft) at its snout. Situated on the south facing slope of the main Great Himalayas range, it originates from the eastern slope of Trishuli and the southern slope of its eastern subsidiary Kohli. The subsidiary glaciers coming off the peaks of Hardeol, Mangraon (6,568 m), Deo Damla (6,637 m), and Sakram (6,254 m) on the eastern rim of the Nanda Devi Sanctuary also flow into it from the west, while on the east it is fed by glaciers from Nanda Gond (6,315 m) and Nanda Pal (6,306 m).

== See also ==
- List of glaciers
- Johar Valley
- Shauka - Johar, Shauka people are a Tibeto-Burman ethnic group living in the Johar Valley of Gori Ganga River
- Tourism in Uttarakhand
