= Jauljibi =

Jauljibi जौलजीवी
- town
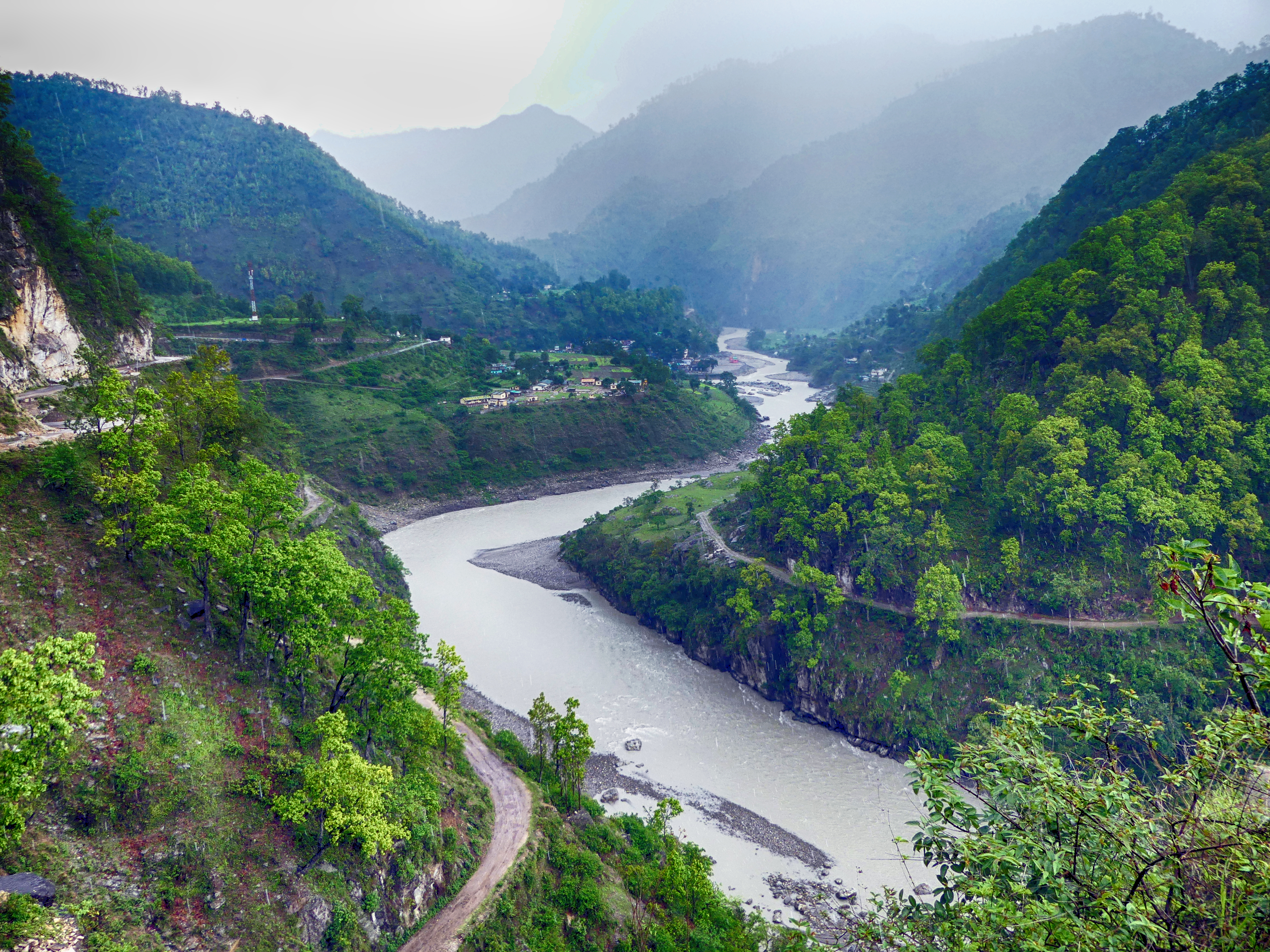
- View of Kali river near Jauljibi

- Location on Nepalese–Indian border Jauljibi (India) Jauljibi (Nepal)
- Coordinates: 29°45′7″N 80°22′40″E
- Countries: India; Nepal
- First level subdivision: Uttarakhand, India; Sudurpashchim, Nepal
- Districts: Pithoragarh, India; Darchula, Nepal

Languages
  - Official: Hindi, Kumaoni
- Time zone: UTC+5:30 (IST)
- Postal code: 262544
- Vehicle registration: UK
- Nearest city: Dharchula/Darchula 28 km (17 mi) north
- Indian Assembly constituency: Dharchula
- Nepalese parliamentary constituency: Darchula 1

Jauljibi (Jaul Jibi) is a small market town dominated by its bazaar on the Indo-Nepal border, situated at the confluences of the Kali and Gori rivers. Jauljibi refers to the villages and bazaars on both sides of the river. The Nepal-side village in Sudurpashchim is much smaller than the Indian one in Uttarakhand. A suspension bridge, rebuilt several times, across the Kāli River has joined the bazaars and the people of both countries for over a hundred years.

Jauljibi is a crossroads where the main road of the Indian district, the Pithoragarh-Jauljibi-Darchula-Tawaghat road which follows the Kali, is joined from the north by the Munsiary-Madkot-Jauljibi road, which follows the Gori River. It is the confluence of trade routes from Nepal to the east, Askot to the west, Johar Pass to Tibet to the north, and the Darma Valley to the northeast.

The town is famous for its annual trade fair held in November, popularly known as the Kumauni Festival. Thousands of people throng to the fair from the neighboring villages and districts to trade and to enjoy music, singing, dancing and food. The trade fair was initiated in 1914 by the Rajbar (zamindar) of Askot.

Until a permanent bridge was built in the 1960s, a bridge across the Kali was rebuilt in November of each year after the monsoon (summer rains), where in July the increased flow in the Kali had swept away the previous year's bridge. On 17 November 1974, during the annual Kumauni Festival and trade fair, the bridge across the Kail collapsed. Flooding in June 2013 again sweep away the suspension bridge.
