= Gori Ganga =

River in Uttarakhand, India

Coordinates: 29.7500°N 80.3763°E

Bhot Pradesh of Kumaon

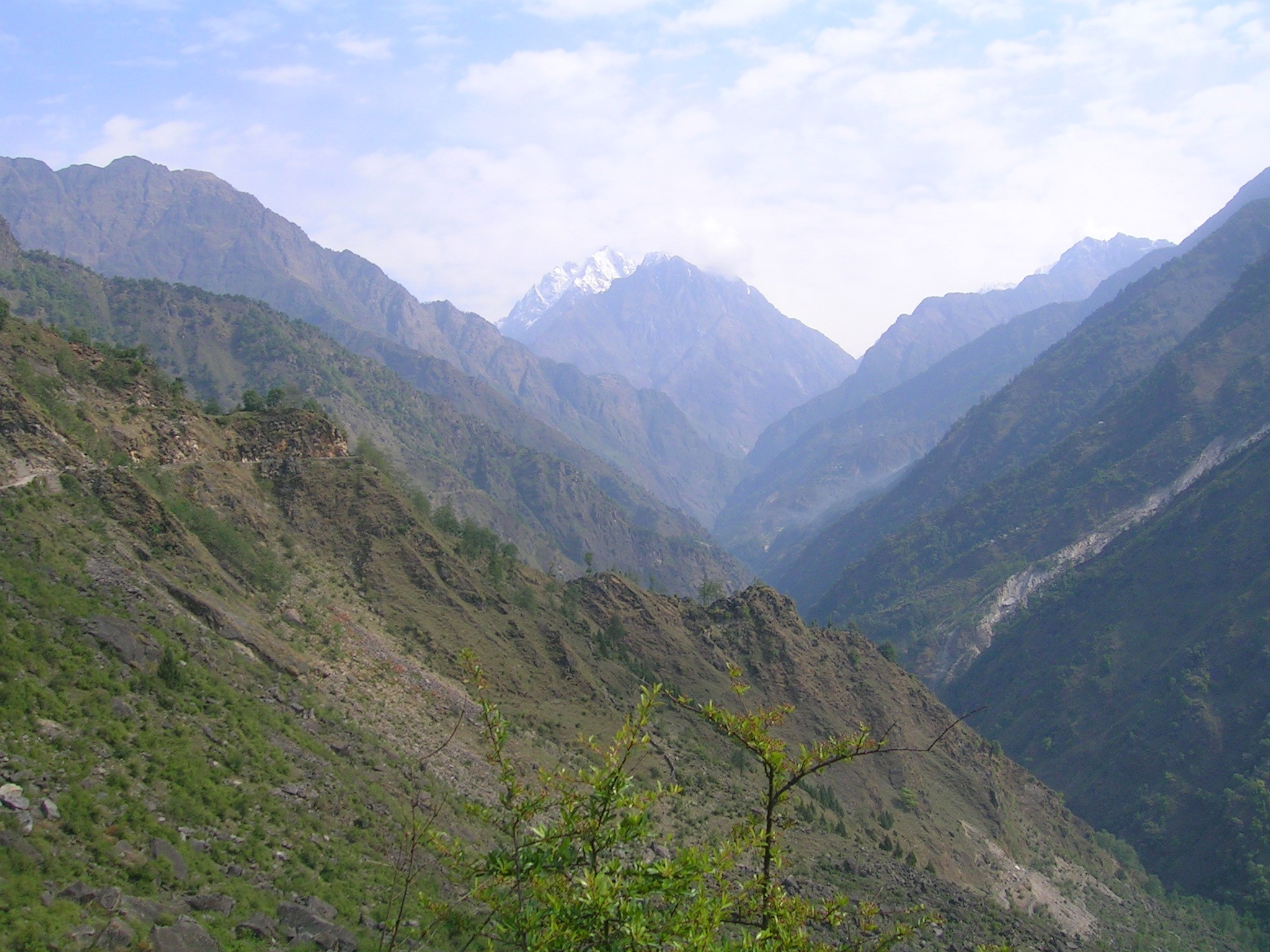
The Gori valley, Hansling in the distance

Gori Ganga (Kumaoni: Gori Gād) is a river in the Munsiari tehsil of the Pithoragarh District, part of the state of Uttarakhand in northern India. Its principal source is the Milam Glacier, just northeast of Nanda Devi along with the Glaciers of the Ralam River, and the Pyunshani and Uttari & Dakshini Balati Glaciers that lie on the western face of the Panchachuli Peaks.

== Etymology ==
In the local language "gori" means white or fair. "Gad" and "ganga" both mean river. The water of this river froths and contains white clay/sand, so it looks white most of the time.

== Historical Observations ==
Historically documented in early 20th-century British gazetteers as the "white river", the Gori Ganga proper rises from the Milam Glacier in the Malla Johar region. Early explorers such as Weller and Webb recorded detailed observations of this glacial source. Weller described the glacier as a massive body of dark, bottle-green ice covered in debris, featuring deep circular craters filled with water. Notably, local inhabitants reported to Weller that the glacier's snout had already receded three to four hundred yards over a forty-year period prior to his visit.

The river flows from the glacier with extreme rapidity. It flows southeast for four miles before its confluence with the Gankha (or Gunka) river just below Milam. Although historical accounts noted that the Gankha had a longer course and greater water volume, the united stream took the name of the Gori. Below the confluence, the river descends rapidly through a rugged gorge, historically calculated as dropping 6,699 feet over 40 miles (roughly 160 feet per mile). It continues on a southerly course for a total of approximately 60 miles, ultimately joining the Kali river near Askot at an elevation of 2,127 feet.

Above Milam in the Gori river glen lies Sunchi-kund, a small, historically significant glacial lake that was held in high repute as a local place of pilgrimage.

== Course ==
The alpine trans-humant village of Milam is located one kilometer below the snout of the glacier. Here a left-bank stream called Gonka joins the Gori. The valley provides the approach route for access to peaks such as Nanda Devi East, Hardeol, Trishuli, Panchchuli and Nanda Kot.

The Gori is also fed by glaciers and streams flowing from the eastern slopes of the east wall of the Nanda Devi Sanctuary, and those flowing west from the high peaks of Panchchuli, Rajramba, and Chaudhara, including the Ralam Gad and the Pyunsani Gadhera. The Kalabaland-Burfu Kalganga glacier system also flows into the Gori Ganga Valley from the east.

The principal rivers joining the main trunk Gori river are listed below -

- Panchu Gad - True Right Bank at Panchu / Ganghar
- Burfu Gad - True Left Bank at Burfu
- Lwa Gad - True Right Bank below Martoli
- Poting Gad - True Right Bank at Bogdayar
- Ralam Gad - True Left Bank upstream of Ruspiabagad
- Jimia Gad - True Right Bank at Jimmighat
- Suring Gad - True Right Bank at Suring Gad / Ghat
- Madkani or Madkanya - True Left Bank at Madkot - This river originates from the Pyunshani and Balati Glaciers at the base of the Panchachuli Peaks
- Ghosi Gad - True Left Bank at Baram
- Rauntees - True Right Bank at Garjia. This is the only major rain fed stream joining the Gori River.

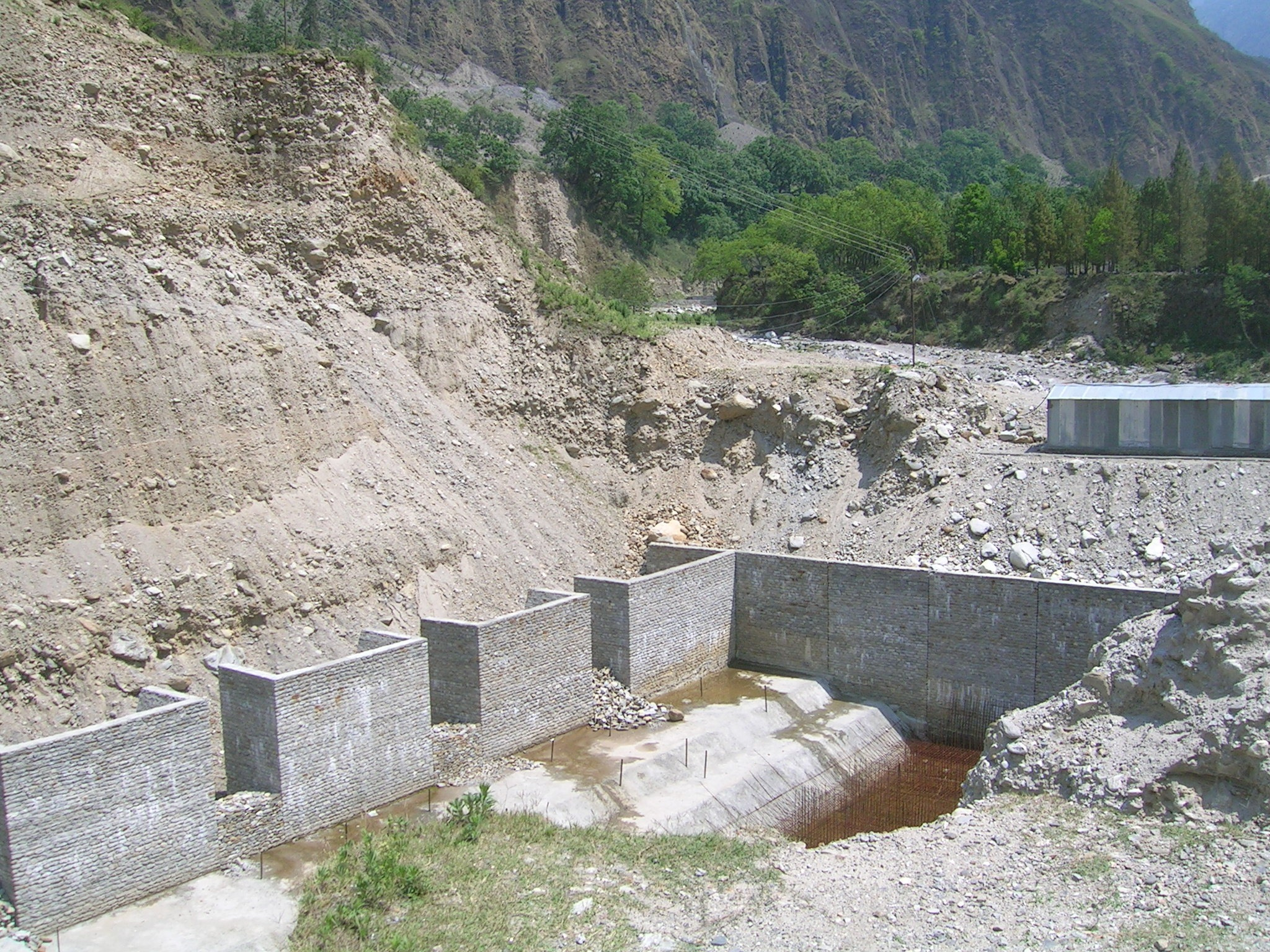
Madkote dam, one among many constructions in the fragile valley

Goriganga joins the Kali River at Jauljibi.
