= Rishiganga =

Coordinates: 30.421°N 79.931°E

Rishiganga Rishi Ganga

Location
- Country: India
- State: Uttarakhand
- Region: Garhwal division
- District: Chamoli

Physical characteristics
- Source: Nanda Devi glacier, Uttari Rishi glacier, Dakshini Rishi glacier, Dakshini Nanda Devi Glacier
- Mouth: Dhauliganga River
- Length: 40 km (25 mi)

Basin features
- Waterbodies: Rishiganga Dam

Rishiganga is a river in the Chamoli district, Uttarakhand, India. It springs from the Uttari Nanda Devi Glacier on the Nanda Devi mountain. It is also fed from the Dakshini Nanda Devi Glacier. Continuing through the Nanda Devi National Park, it flows into the Dhauliganga River near the village Rini.

== 2021 glacial outburst flood ==
Starting approximately 10:45 a.m. IST on 7 February 2021, a flooding disaster occurred all along the river and its gorge following a landslide, avalanche or glacial lake outburst flood.

Flash flood on February 7 in Chamoli district, Uttarakhand, claimed at least 72 lives with at least 200 missing. Now, Geological Survey of India (GSI) has submitted its report on causes of the disaster.

Key findings:

The flash flood was due to a large mass of snow, ice and rock avalanche along with a hanging mass of rock crashing into the Raunthi Garh valley floor. This impact pulverised the combination of rock, snow and ice, causing a rapid flow downstream of Raunthi Garh and into the Rishiganga valley leading to the deluge. A contributory factor was unusually warm weather in the region. There was no evidence of a Glacial Lake Outburst Flood (GLOF) having caused the event.

What happened on February 7?

A glacial break in the Tapovan-Reni area of Chamoli District of Uttarakhand led to massive flash flood in Dhauli Ganga and Alaknanda Rivers, damaging houses and the nearby Rishiganga power project.

== Gallery ==
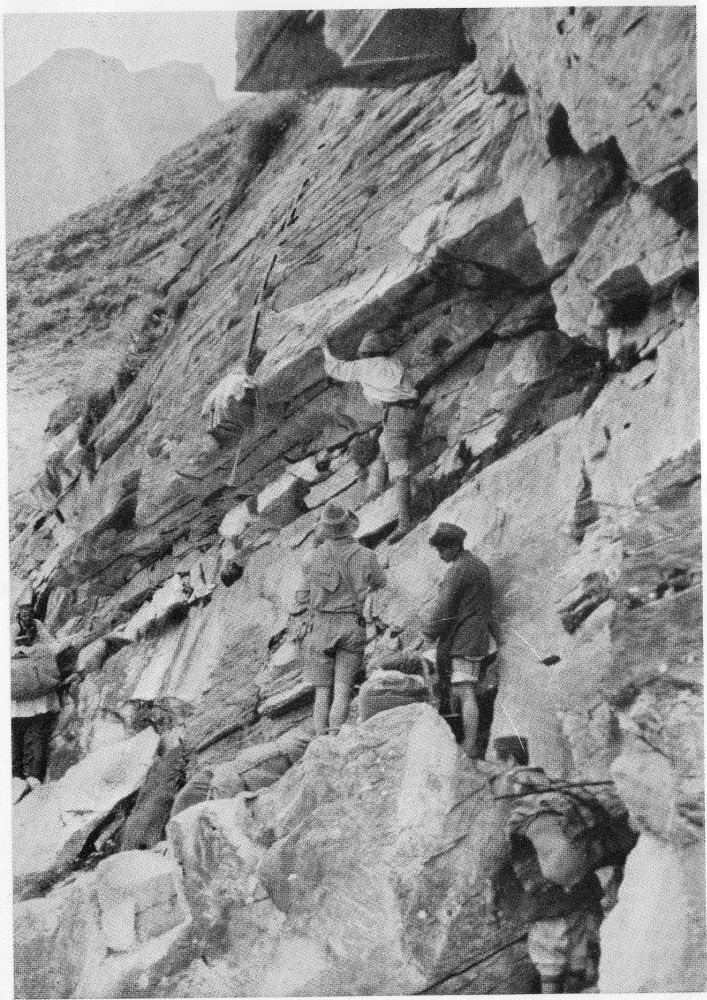
photograph from the Shipton–Tilman Nanda Devi expeditions

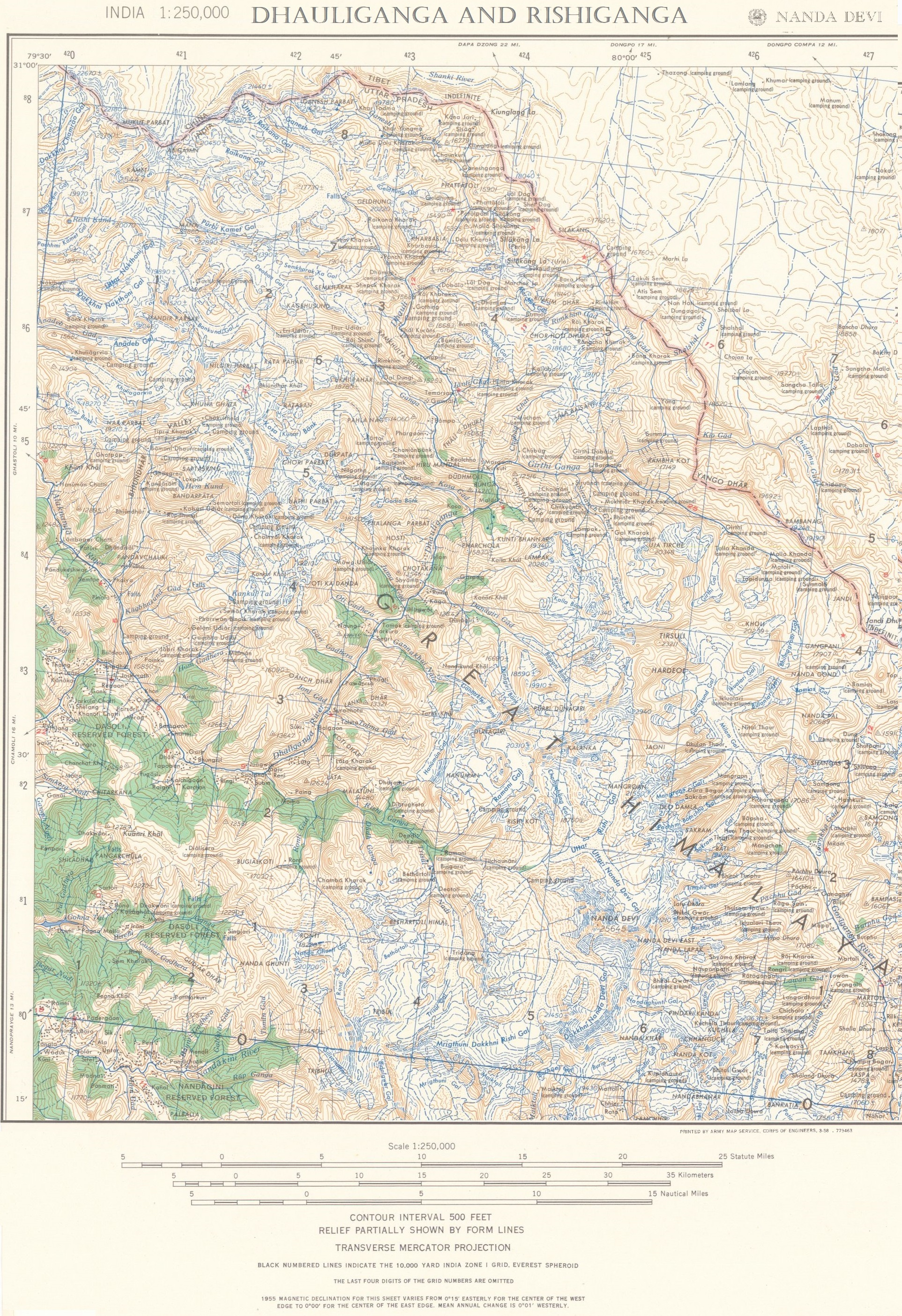
The Rishiganga and Dhauliganga river valleys in the Himalayas.
