= Nanda Devi Glacier =

Glacier in India

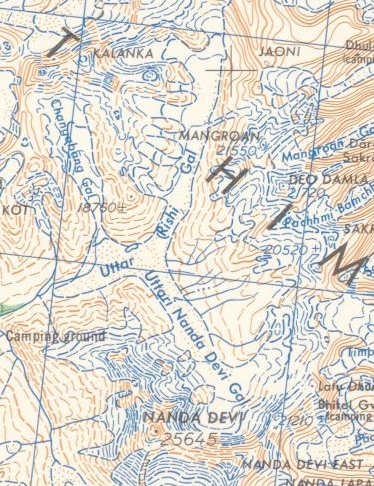
- Nanda Devi Glacier

- Location within Uttarakhand Location within India
- Interactive map of Nanda Devi Glacier
- Location: Himalayas, India
- Coordinates: 30°24′45″N 79°58′58″E

Nanda Devi Glacier is a glacier in Chamoli district, Uttarakhand, India. It is near Nanda Devi.

The Nanda Devi Group of glaciers is a reference to the cluster of seven glaciers namely Bartoli, Kururntoli, Nada Devi North, Nanda Devi South, Nandakna, Ramani and Trsul of Uttarakhand.

The glacier rose to fame, due to its breaking, which led to the 2021 Uttarakhand flood. Climate change has been suggested to have contributed to the disaster.

== See also ==
- Mangraon
- Nanda Devi National Park
- 2021 Uttarakhand flood
- Uttari Rishi Glacier

== External links and references ==
- Why did the Nanda Devi glacier melt, mid-winter
- A Youtube on why the Nandi Devi glacier melted, mid-winter
- A Youtube, Could the Uttarakhand disaster have been averted?
