= Dhauliganga River =

River in Uttarakhand, India

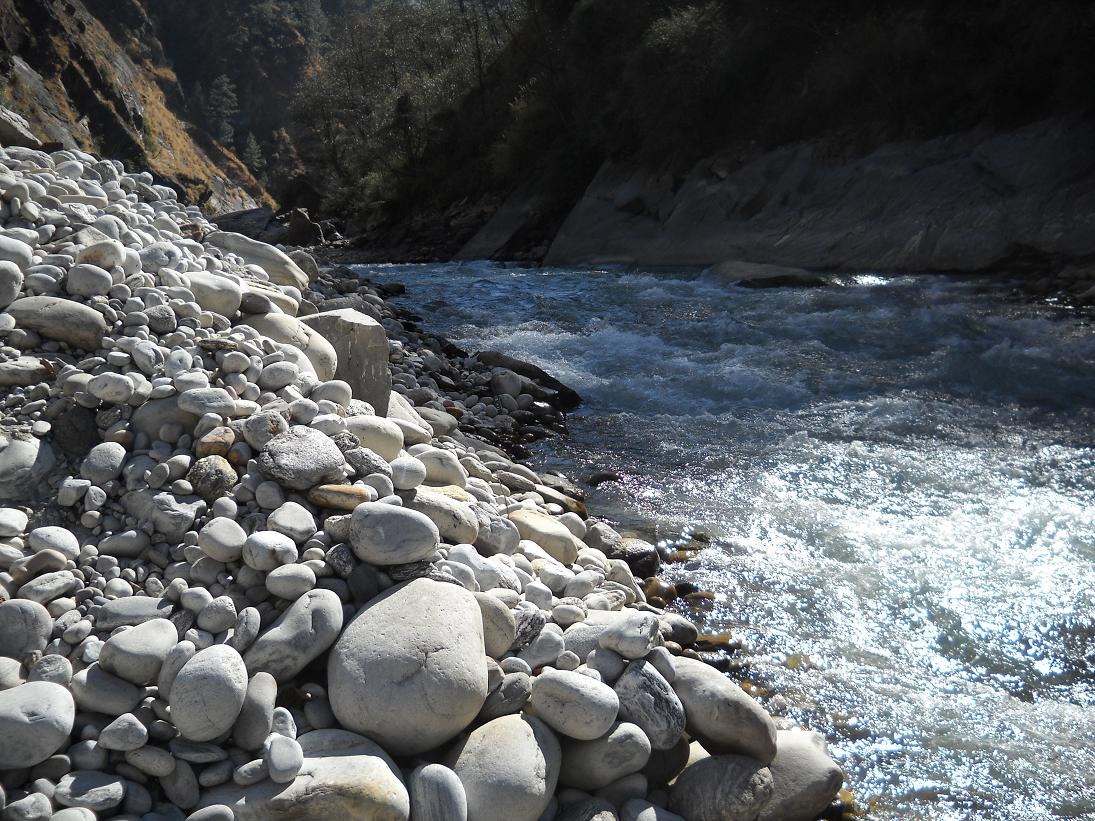
The Dhauliganga river tumbling in to meet the Alaknanda River at Vishnuprayag in the Garhwal Himalayas.

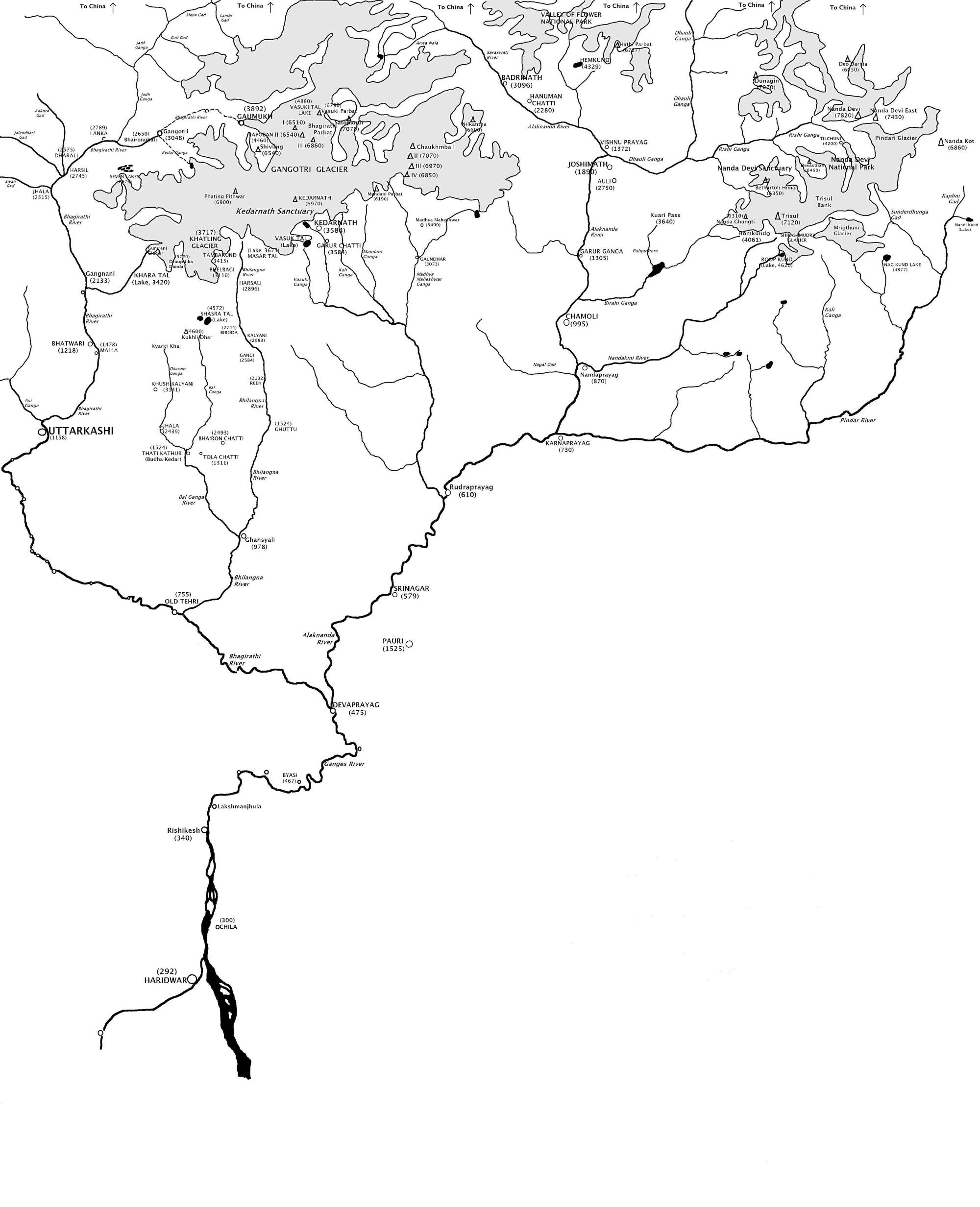
A map of the headwaters of the Ganges river, showing the Dhauliganga at the top right.

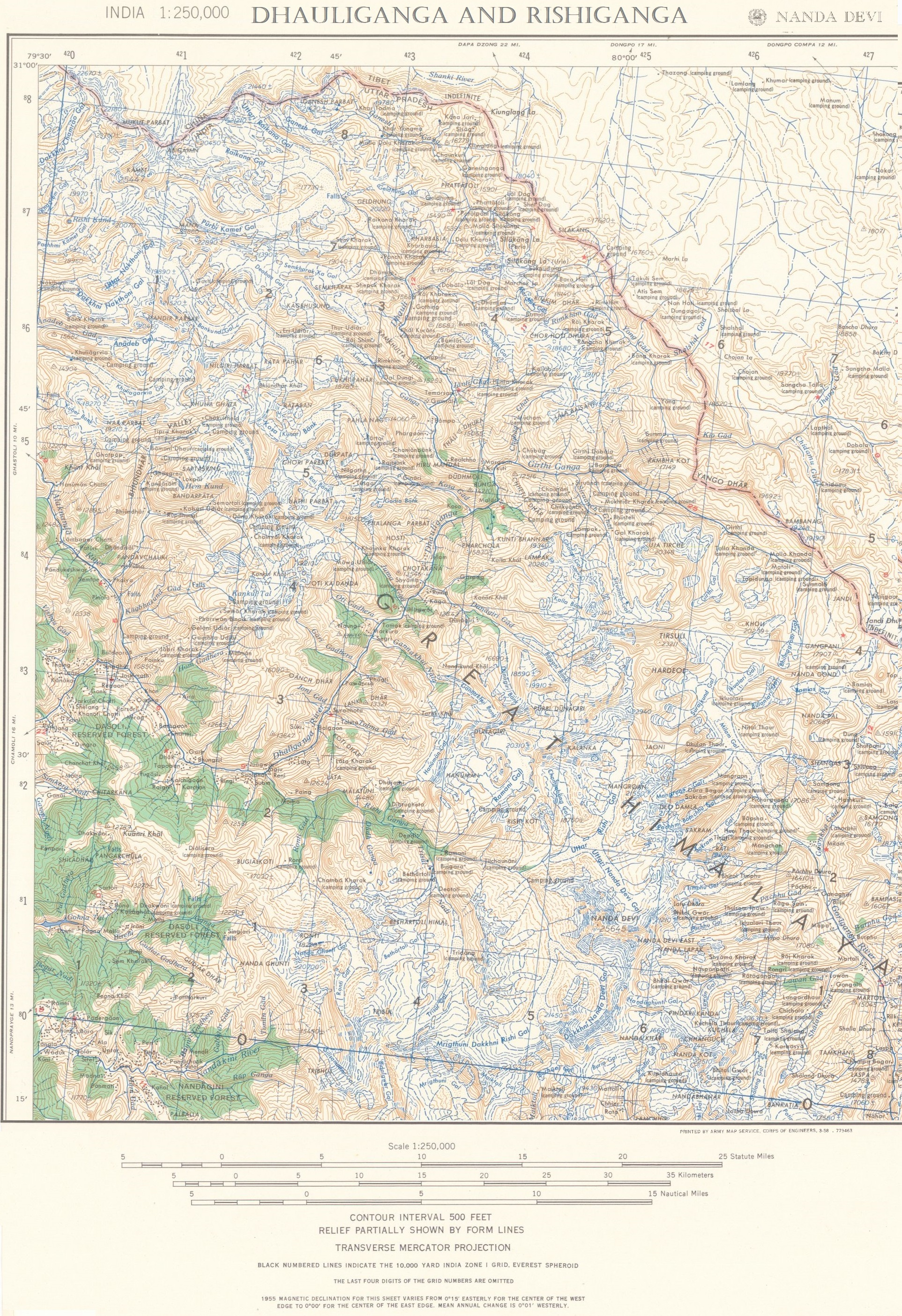
The Dhauliganga river valley shown in a high-resolution map based on detailed surveys

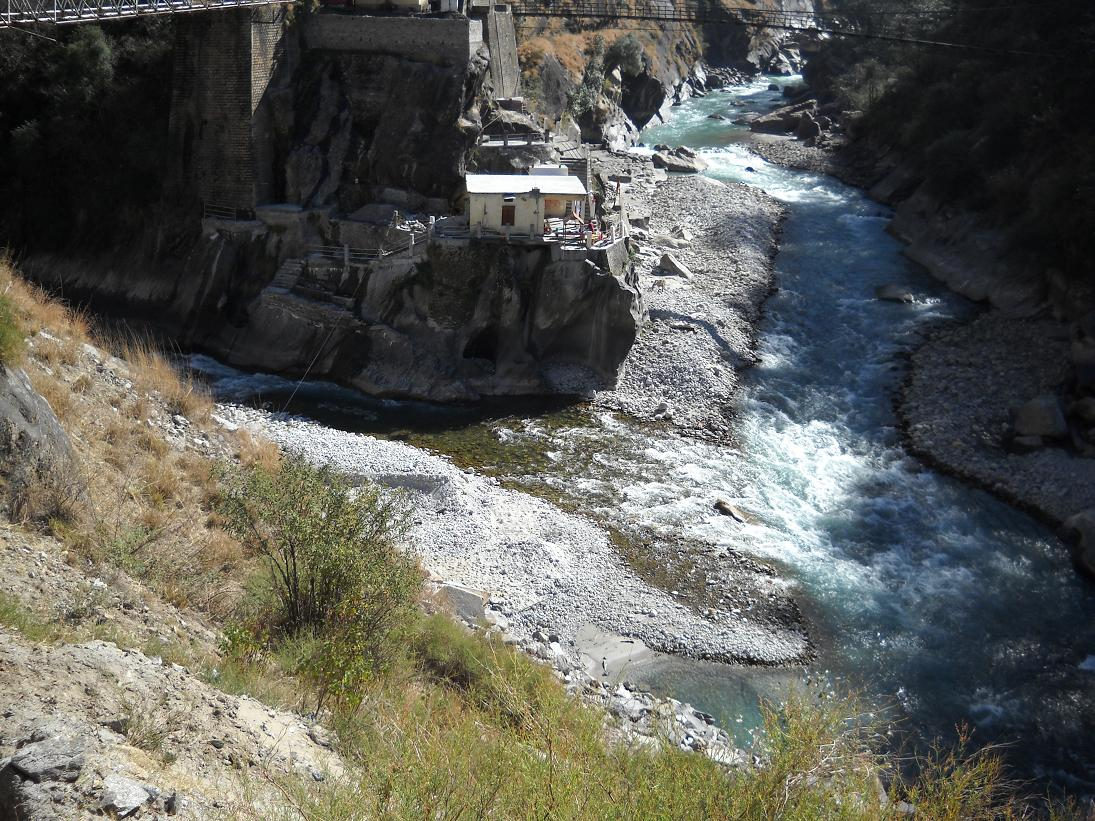
The confluence with the Alaknanda

The Dhauliganga is a turbulent Himalayan river which rises in the border regions of India and China and flows south into the Garhwal region of Uttarakhand, India. It joins the Alaknanda, the major source stream of the Ganges river.

== Course ==
Dhauliganga rises in the vicinity of the Niti Pass in the border regions between Garhwal and southwestern Tibet. It flows 50 km (30 mi) southwards until it meets the Rishiganga on its left bank at Rini, in the vicinity of Tapovan in Chamoli district. It then flows 20 km (10 mi) westwards until it meets the Alaknanda at Vishnuprayag and terminates—the confluence just upstream of the city of Joshimath. The upper Dhauliganga valley parts the East-West Himalayan axis, with Nanda Devi and its subsidiary peaks to its left and Kamet and its subsidiary peaks to its right.

== Nanda Devi glacier flood ==
On 7 February 2021, part of Nanda Devi Glacier, a Himalayan glacier in the Nanda Devi National Park, broke away and caused water levels in the Rishiganga and Dhauliganga rivers to rise. The Dhauliganga Dam at the Dhauliganga hydropower project at Reni village (30.485°N 79.691°E) was destroyed and another suffered partial collapse. Initial reports said nine people were killed and 140 missing. Water levels on the Alaknanda also rose.
