= Jogin III =

Mountain in Uttarakhand, India

- Location within Uttarakhand

Highest point
- Elevation: 6,116 m (20,066 ft)
- Coordinates: 30°52′21″N 78°56′05″E

Geography
- Location: Uttarakhand, India
- Parent range: Garhwal Himalaya

Climbing
- First ascent: In June 1967, a team led by Dr. G. R. Patwardhan climbed Jogin III.

Jogin III is a mountain of the Garhwal Himalaya in Uttarakhand, India. The elevation of Jogin III is 6,116 metres (20,066 ft). It is 155th highest located entirely within the Uttrakhand. Nanda Devi, is the highest mountain in this category.

== Gangotri National Park ==
The entire surrounding area are protected within the 2,390 km^{2} (920 sq mi) Gangotri National Park, one of the largest conservation area in India. The Gangotri National Park is home to several world-class treks, including Gangotri Gomukh Tapoban Nandanvan, Kerdarnath Vasuki tal trek, Har ki dun valley trek, Badrinath to Satopanth tal trek, Gangotri to Kedar tal trek, Gangotri to Badrinath trek via Kalindi khal and many more.

== Climbing history ==
In June 1967, a team led by Dr. G. R. Patwardhan had the privilege of first ascent of Jogin III.

On June 13 A ladies expedition team of Bharat Outward Bound Pioneers of Pune, reached the summit of Jogin III. They set up four camps in between base camp and summit. Dr. Miss K.B. Sorab and Sherpa Chewang Thondup reached the summit from Camp IV.

Girivihar A club from Bombay, India made a joint expedition to Jogin I and III led by (Miss) Neeta Bhoir. The team consisted of Shrikant Oka, Anil Kumar, Ashok Raj- derkar, Sanjay Borole, Suhas Risbud. They set up Camps I, II and III at 16,500, 17,500 and 19,100 feet respectively. Camp III was in the col from which Jogin I and III were climbed. On June 10 Borole and the high-altitude porter Datta climbed Jogin III (6116 meters, 20,065 feet) . On June 11 the second team of Oka, Risbud and porter Nar set out at 2:30 A.M. and reached the summit of Jogin III at 4:30 A.M.

== Neighboring and subsidiary peaks ==
neighboring or subsidiary peaks of Jogin III:

- Thalay Sagar: 6,904 m (22,651 ft)30°51′29″N 78°59′50″E
- Meru Peak: 6,660 m (21,850 ft)30°52′05″N 79°01′56″E
- Manda III: 6,529 m (21,421 ft)30°54′18″N 79°00′01″E
- Shivling: 6,543 m (21,467 ft)30°52′37″N 79°03′56″E
- Gangotri I: 6,682 m (21,923 ft)30°55′04″N 78°50′49″E
- Gangotri II: 6,590 m (21,621 ft)30°54′23″N 78°51′21″E
- Gangotri III: 6,577 m (21,578 ft)30°52′57″N 78°52′05″E
- Jogin II: 6,342 m (20,807 ft)30°53′45″N 78°55′58″E

== Glaciers and rivers ==
On the southern side lies jogin Glacier and Ratangiran Glacier. On the eastern side lies Kedar Bamak and on the western side lies Rudugaira Bamak. Kedar Ganga emerges from Kedar bamak and joins Bhagirathi River near Gangotri. Rudugaira nala emerges from Rudugaira Bamak also joins Bhagirathi river close to Gangotri. Both the glacier drain down to Bhagirathi River near Gangotri. On the southern side Jogin Glacier joins Khatling Glacier so is Ratangiran Glacier. From Khatling Glacier emerges Bhilangana River that also joins Bhgirathi river near Tehri one of the main tributaries of river Ganga. Bhagirathi joins the Alaknanda River the other main tributaries of river Ganga at Dev Prayag and called Ganga there after.

== See also ==
- List of Himalayan peaks of Uttarakhand
