= Manda I =

Mountain in Uttarakhand, India

- Manda
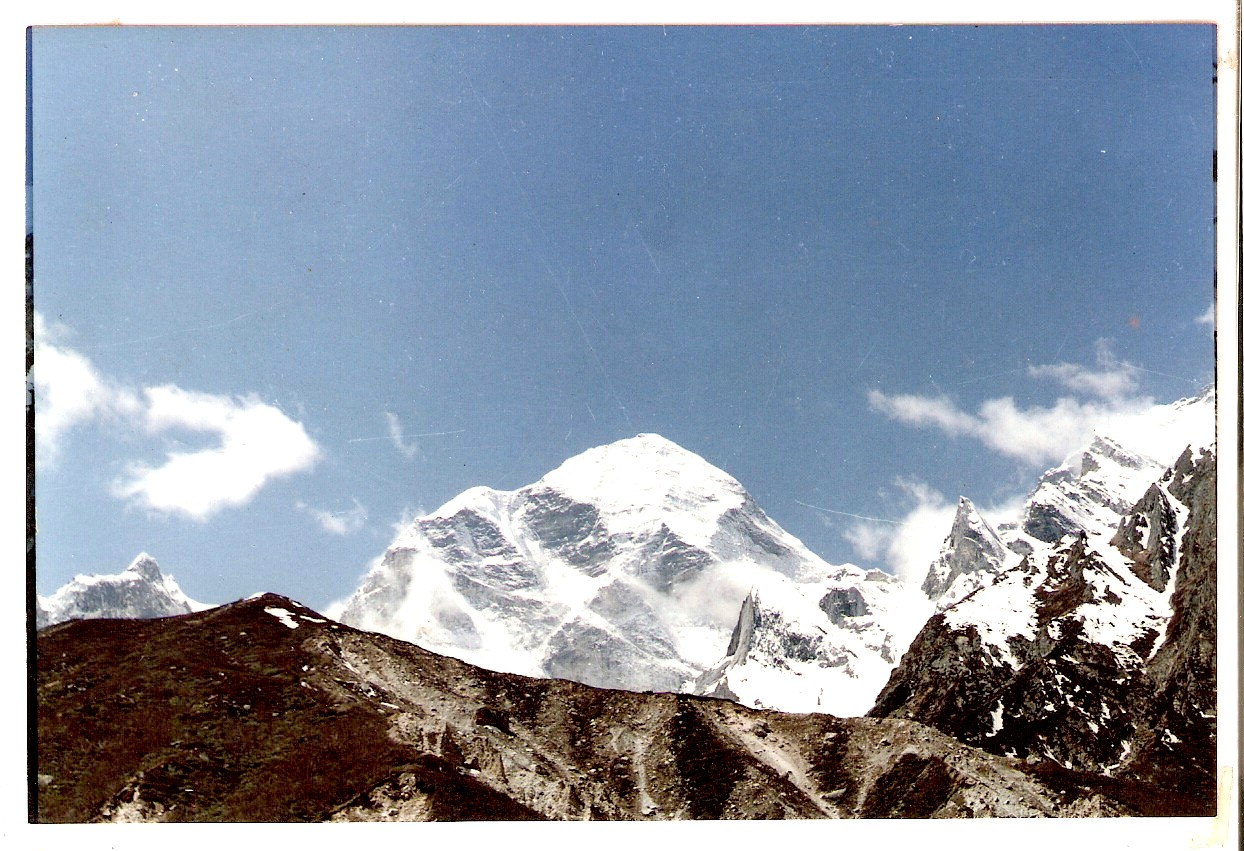
- Manda I North East face

Highest point
- Elevation: 6,510 m (21,360 ft)
- Prominence: 226 m (741 ft)
- Coordinates: 30°56′25″N 78°59′55″E

Geography
- Location within Uttarakhand
- Location: Uttarakhand, India
- Parent range: Garhwal Himalaya

Climbing
- First ascent: First ascent by Minoo Mehta and team in 1980

Manda I is a mountain of the Garhwal Himalaya in Uttarakhand India also called Manda. The elevation of Manda I is 6,510 metres (21,358 ft) and its prominence is 226 metres (741 ft). It is joint 86th highest located entirely within the Uttarakhand. Nanda Devi, is the highest mountain in this category. It lies 1.6 km (0.99 mi) north of Manda II 6,564 metres (21,535 ft) and 3.9 km (2.4 mi) north of Manda III 6,529 metres (21,421 ft). It lies 7.8 km (4.8 mi) NE of Jogin II 6,242 metres (20,479 ft). It is located 6.6 km (4.1 mi) north of Bhrigupanth 6,772 metres (22,218 ft) and 9.6 km (6.0 mi) SW lies Jogin I 6,465 metres (21,211 ft).

== Gangotri National Park ==
The entire surrounding area are protected within the 2,390 km^{2} (920 sq mi) Gangotri National Park, one of the largest conservation area in India. The Gangotri National Park is home to several world-class treks, including Gangotri Gomukh Tapoban Nandanvan, Kerdarnath Vasuki tal trek, Har ki dun valley trek, Badrinath to Satopanth tal trek, Gangotri to Kedartal trek, Gangotri to Badrinath trek via Kalindi khal and many more.

== Climbing history ==
A five-member team led by Minoo Mehta together with Danesh Kalyaniwala, Muslim Contractor, Rustom Antia and Nandan Singh (HAP) attempted Manda from Kedar ganga valley, Kedar glacier. Rustom Antia and Nandan Singh reached the top on 4 June 1981. This was the first ascent of Manda. The second ascent of Manda by Ehime University of Japan in 1981. A five-member team of Ehime University of Japan comprising Masatosi Sasaki, Tomoyuki Sogabe, Takanori Sasaki, Hiroyuki Kawaguchi and Tsunenori Okada. On June 18 Sogabe, T. Sasaki and Kawaguchi reached the summit following the same route of Minoo Mehta.

== Neighboring and subsidiary peaks ==
neighboring or subsidiary peaks of Manda I:

- Thalay Sagar: 6,904 m (22,651 ft)30°51′29″N 78°59′50″E
- Meru Peak: 6,660 m (21,850 ft)30°52′05″N 79°01′56″E
- Manda III: 6,529 m (21,421 ft)30°54′18″N 79°00′01″E
- Shivling: 6,543 m (21,467 ft)30°52′37″N 79°03′56″E
- Gangotri I: 6,682 m (21,923 ft)30°55′04″N 78°50′49″E
- Gangotri II: 6,590 m (21,621 ft)30°54′23″N 78°51′21″E
- Gangotri III: 6,577 m (21,578 ft)30°52′57″N 78°52′05″E
- Jogin II: 6,342 m (20,807 ft)30°53′45″N 78°55′58″E

== Glaciers and rivers ==
On the western side lies Kedar Bamak and on the eastern side lies Bhrigupanth Bamak. Kedar Ganga emerges from Kedar bamak and joins Bhagirathi River near Gangotri. Bhrigupanth Bamak drain down to Bhagirathi River near Bhojwas. Bhagirathi joins the Alaknanda River the other main tributaries of river Ganga at Dev Prayag and called Ganga there after.

== See also ==
- List of Himalayan peaks of Uttarakhand
