= Manda II =

Mountain in Uttarakhand, India

- Manda II (south)
- Location within Uttarakhand

Highest point
- Elevation: 6,568 m (21,549 ft)
- Prominence: 583 m (1,913 ft)
- Coordinates: 30°55′34″N 78°59′55″E

Geography
- Location: Uttarakhand, India
- Parent range: Garhwal Himalaya

Climbing
- First ascent: In 1982 an American expedition, through the South Ridge.

Manda II is a mountain of the Garhwal Himalaya in Uttarakhand India also called Manda south. The elevation of Manda II is 6,568 metres (21,549 ft) and its prominence is 583 metres (1,913 ft). It is joint 71st highest located entirely within the Uttrakhand. Nanda Devi, is the highest mountain in this category. It lies 1.6 km (0.99 mi) south of Manda I 6,511 metres (21,362 ft) and 2.4 km (1.5 mi) north of Manda III 6,529 metres (21,421 ft). It lies 7.1 km (4.4 mi) NE of Jogin II 6,342 metres (20,807 ft). Its nearest higher neighbor is Bhrigupanth 6,772 metres (22,218 ft). It is located 8.1 km (5.0 mi) NW of Shivling (mountain) 6,543 metres (21,467 ft) and 14.6 km (9.1 mi) west lies Gangotri I 6,682 metres (21,923 ft).

== Gangotri National Park ==
The entire surrounding area are protected within the 2,390 km^{2} (920 sq mi) Gangotri National Park, one of the largest conservation area in India. The Gangotri National Park is home to several world-class treks, including Gangotri Gomukh Tapoban Nandanvan, Kerdarnath Vasuki tal trek, Har ki dun valley trek, Badrinath to Satopanth tal trek, Gangotri to Kedartal trek, Gangotri to Badrinath trek via Kalindi khal and many more.

== Climbing history ==
In 1982 an American expedition, led by Mark Udall had the privilege of first ascent of Manda II through the South Ridge.

A group of climbers from Junipers, a climbing club of Calcutta decided to attempt Manda II from the east. The team led by Avijit Das, comprised Arnab Banerjee, Arka Ghosh, Kaushik Pal, RK Gambhisana, Thapa (HAP), Dil (HAP), and Dharmi (cook). On June 21 four members reached the summit around 4: 00 p.m. Fixing a total of 760 meters rope below the summit ridge. This is only the second summit of this peak and first Indian summit.

== Neighboring and subsidiary peaks ==
neighboring or subsidiary peaks of Manda II:

- Thalay Sagar: 6,904 m (22,651 ft)30°51′29″N 78°59′50″E
- Meru Peak: 6,660 m (21,850 ft)30°52′05″N 79°01′56″E
- Manda III: 6,529 m (21,421 ft)30°54′18″N 79°00′01″E
- Shivling: 6,543 m (21,467 ft)30°52′37″N 79°03′56″E
- Gangotri I: 6,682 m (21,923 ft)30°55′04″N 78°50′49″E
- Gangotri II: 6,590 m (21,621 ft)30°54′23″N 78°51′21″E
- Gangotri III: 6,577 m (21,578 ft)30°52′57″N 78°52′05″E
- Jogin II: 6,342 m (20,807 ft)30°53′45″N 78°55′58″E

== Glaciers and rivers ==
On the western side lies Kedar Bamak and on the eastern side lies Bhrigupanth Bamak. Kedar Ganga emerges from Kedar bamak and joins Bhagirathi River near Gangotri. Bhrigupanth Bamak drain down to Bhagirathi River near Bhojwas. Bhagirathi joins the Alaknanda River the other main tributaries of river Ganga at Dev Prayag and called Ganga there after.

== See also ==
- List of Himalayan peaks of Uttarakhand
