= Bhrigu Parbat =

Mountain in Uttarakhand, India

- Location within Uttarakhand

Highest point
- Elevation: 6,041 m (19,820 ft)
- Coordinates: 30°57′34″N 78°59′06″E

Geography
- Location: Uttarakhand, India
- Parent range: Garhwal Himalaya

Climbing
- First ascent: September 2, 2001 by a nine-member Indian expedition led by Dr Anjan Chaudhary

Bhrigu Parbat is a mountain of the Garhwal Himalaya in Uttarakhand India. It is situated in the Gangotri National Park. The elevation of Bhrigu Parbat is 6,041 metres (19,820 ft). It is joint 167th highest located entirely within the Uttrakhand. Nanda Devi, is the highest mountain in this category. It lies NNW to Manda I 6,491 metres (21,296 ft) its nearest higher neighbor.

== Climbing history ==
A nine-member Indian expedition team from west Bengal led by Dr Anjan Chaudhary climbed Bhrigu Parvat (6041m), on September 2, 2001. They approached the peak from north of Manda via the Kedar Kharak. The summit was reached on September 2 by Tanmoy Chakraborty and Arun Danti Das.

== Neighboring and subsidiary peaks ==
Neighboring or subsidiary peaks of Bhrigu Parbat:

- Manda III: 6,529 m (21,421 ft)30°54′18″N 79°00′01″E
- Shivling: 6,543 m (21,467 ft)30°52′37″N 79°03′56″E
- Gangotri I: 6,682 m (21,923 ft)30°55′04″N 78°50′49″E
- Jogin II: 6,342 m (20,807 ft)30°53′45″N 78°55′58″E
- Thalay Sagar: 6,904 m (22,651 ft)30°51′29″N 78°59′50″E
- Meru Peak: 6,660 m (21,850 ft)30°52′05″N 79°01′56″E

== Glaciers and rivers ==
On the western side lies Kedar Bamak and on the eastern side lies Bhrigupanth Bamak and Manda Bamak. Kedar Ganga emerges from Kedar bamak and joins Bhagirathi River near Gangotri. Bhrigupanth Bamak and Manda Bamak drain down to Bhagirathi River near Bhojwas. Bhagirathi joins the Alaknanda River the other main tributaries of river Ganga at Dev Prayag and called Ganga there after.

== See also ==
- List of Himalayan peaks of Uttarakhand
