= Jogin I =

Mountain in Uttarakhand, India

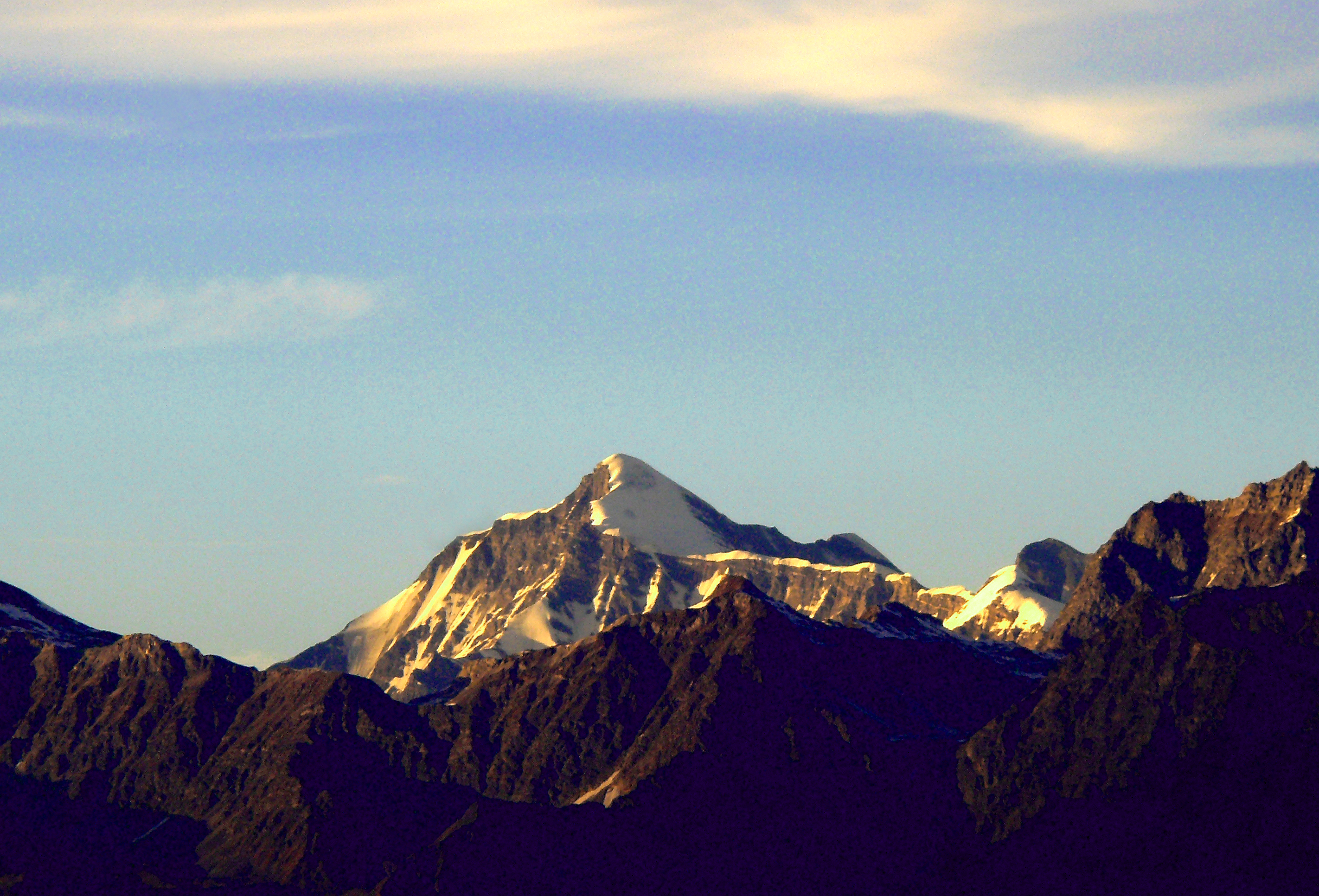
- Jogin I from Kartick Swamy

Highest point
- Elevation: 6,465 m (21,211 ft)
- Prominence: 843 m (2,766 ft)
- Coordinates: 30°52′42″N 78°55′31″E

Geography
- Location within Uttarakhand
- Location: Uttarakhand, India
- Parent range: Garhwal Himalaya

Climbing
- First ascent: On 22 June 1970, the students of 19th Advance Course of NIM led by its Principal Colonel J. C. Joshi of the successful Indian Everest Expedition team climbed Jogin I

Jogin I is a mountain of the Garhwal Himalaya in Uttarakhand India.The elevation of Jogin I is 6,465 metres (21,211 ft) and its prominence is 843 metres (2,766 ft). It is 94th highest located entirely within the Uttrakhand. Nanda Devi, is the highest mountain in this category. It lies 5.4 km east of Gangotri III and 7.4 km west of Bhrigupanth 6,772 metres (22,218 ft). It lies 2.2 km South of Jogin II. Its nearest higher neighbor is Gangotri III 6,577 metres (21,578 ft). It is located 6.9 km NW of Thalaysagar 6,904 metres (22,651 ft) and 8.8 km NW lies Gangotri I 6,682 metres (21,923 ft).

== Gangotri National Park ==
The entire surrounding area are protected within the 2,390 km^{2} (920 sq mi) Gangotri National Park, one of the largest conservation area in India. The Gangotri National Park is home to several world-class treks, including Gangotri Gomukh Tapoban Nandanvan, Kerdarnath Vasuki tal trek, Har ki dun valley trek, Badrinath to Satopanth tal trek, Gangotri to Kedar tal trek, Gangotri to Badrinath trek via Kalindi khal and many more.

== Climbing history ==
Jogin I was first climbed on 22 June 1970, by the students of 19th Advance Course of NIM led by successful Indian Everester its Principal Colonel J. C. Joshi.

A British Expedition led by Paul Farmer in September - October 2000 made an unsuccessful attempt. This 6 member British team attempted the peak in the Kedarganga valley in the post monsoon season. They had to turn back from 5,900 m due to too much unconsolidated snow.

A six-member team of Walt Kaskel, Joseph Mazzotta, Dick Osborn, Dick Painter, Ron Rickman and Tony Lewis as leader began their two-day trek up the Kedar Ganga from Gangotri on May 30 and placed their Base Camp above the Kedar Tal lake, at 15,000 feet. they made Camp I at 17,500 feet on June 3, after climbing the right side of the icefall they established Camp II at 18,500 feet. On June 6, they left Camp II and through knee-deep snow they reached the summit.

== Neighboring and subsidiary peaks ==
neighboring or subsidiary peaks of Jogin I:

- Thalay Sagar: 6,904 m (22,651 ft)30°51′29″N 78°59′50″E
- Meru Peak: 6,660 m (21,850 ft)30°52′05″N 79°01′56″E
- Manda III: 6,529 m (21,421 ft)30°54′18″N 79°00′01″E
- Shivling: 6,543 m (21,467 ft)30°52′37″N 79°03′56″E
- Gangotri I: 6,682 m (21,923 ft)30°55′04″N 78°50′49″E
- Gangotri II: 6,590 m (21,621 ft)30°54′23″N 78°51′21″E
- Gangotri III: 6,577 m (21,578 ft)30°52′57″N 78°52′05″E
- Jogin II: 6,342 m (20,807 ft)30°53′45″N 78°55′58″E

== Glaciers and rivers ==
On the southern side lies jogin Glacier and Ratangiran Glacier. On the eastern side lies Kedar Bamak and on the western side lies Rudugaira Bamak. Kedar Ganga emerges from Kedar bamak and joins Bhagirathi River near Gangotri. Rudugaira nala emerges from Rudugaira Bamak also joins Bhagirathi river close to Gangotri. Both the glacier drain down to Bhagirathi River near Gangotri. On the southern side Jogin Glacier joins Khatling Glacier so is Ratangiran Glacier. From Khatling Glacier emerges Bhilangana River that also joins Bhgirathi river near Tehri one of the main tributaries of river Ganga. Bhagirathi joins the Alaknanda River the other main tributaries of river Ganga at Dev Prayag and called Ganga there after.

== See also ==
- List of Himalayan peaks of Uttarakhand
