= Srikantha (mountain) =

Mountain in Uttarakhand, India

- Location within Uttarakhand

Highest point
- Elevation: 6,133 m (20,121 ft)
- Prominence: 471 m (1,545 ft)
- Coordinates: 30°57′24″N 78°48′10″E

Geography
- Location: Uttarakhand, India
- Parent range: Garhwal Himalaya

Srikantha is a mountain of the Garhwal Himalaya in Uttarakhand India. The elevation of Srikantha is 6,133 metres (20,121 ft) and its prominence is 471 metres (1,545 ft). It is 151st highest located entirely within the Uttrakhand. Nanda Devi, is the highest mountain in this category. It lies 5.8 km NW of Gangotri I 6,672 metres (21,890 ft). Jaonli 6,632 metres (21,759 ft) lies 12.3 km SSE and it is 18.6 km west of Manda I 6,510 metres (21,358 ft). It lies 14.4 km NW of Jogin I 6,465 metres (21,211 ft).

== Climbing history ==
1st ascent of Srikantha done by Nehru Institute of Mountaineering in Oct. 1971.

On May 16, 1978, A team of ten men led by Milan Sen Gupta from Asansol climbed Srikantha. Further details are not known.

A 12-members all Women's team led by Chandra Prabha Aitwal climbed Srikantba on September 27, 1997, from Uttarkashi, India. They establishing base camp at 4000 meters near Jangla in the Dudu Bamak and three more camps, the summit was reached via the north ridge. The summiteers were Suman Kutiyal, Lata Joshi, Nari Dhami, Radha Rana and Kavita Budhathoki.

== Neighboring and subsidiary peaks ==
Neighboring or subsidiary peaks of Srikantha:

- Gangotri I: 6,682 m (21,923 ft)30°55′04″N 78°50′49″E
- Gangotri II: 6,590 m (21,621 ft)30°54′23″N 78°51′21″E
- Gangotri III: 6,577 m (21,578 ft)30°52′57″N 78°52′05″E
- Jogin II: 6,342 m (20,807 ft)30°53′45″N 78°55′58″E
- Thalay Sagar: 6,904 m (22,651 ft)30°51′29″N 78°59′50″E
- Manda III: 6,529 m (21,421 ft)30°54′18″N 79°00′01″E
- Shivling: 6,543 m (21,467 ft)30°52′37″N 79°03′56″E

== Glaciers and rivers ==
It stands at the head of Dudu Bamak on the eastern side. The glacier flows from south to north and joins Bhagirathi River On the Southern side Jaonli Glacier flowing from SE to NW and also joins Bhagirathi river. Bhagirathi River is one of the main tributaries of river Ganga that later joins Alaknanda River the other main tributaries of river Ganga at Devprayag and became Ganga there after.

== See also ==
- List of Himalayan peaks of Uttarakhand
