= Kedartal =

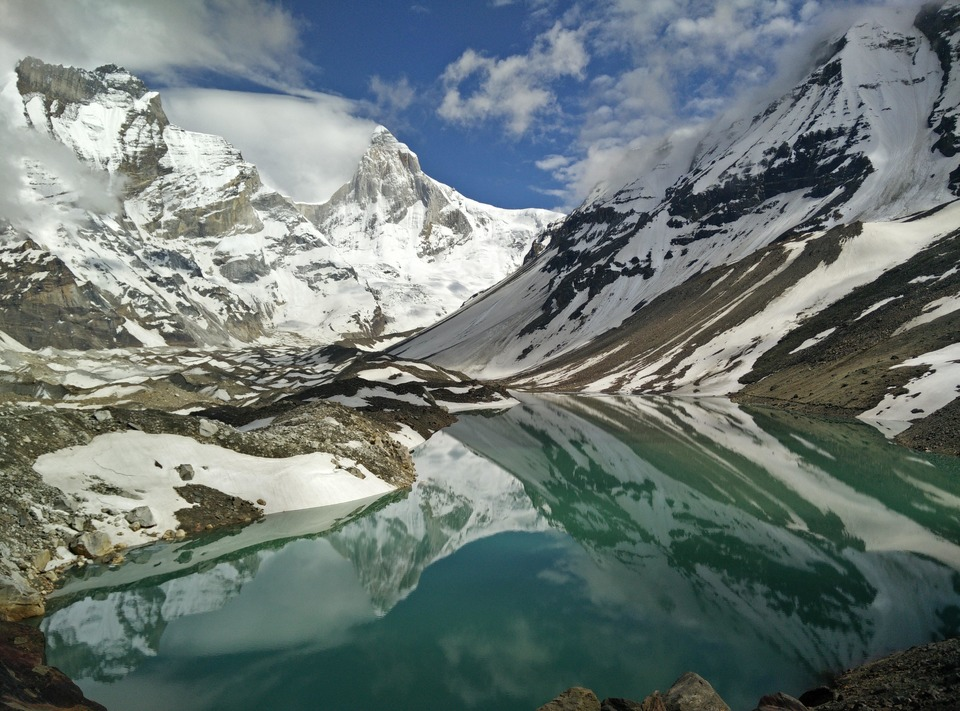

- Location within Uttarakhand
- Interactive map of Kedartal
- Location: Indian Himalayas
- Coordinates: 30.91206°N 78.95758°E
- Basin countries: India
- Surface elevation: 5,000 m (16,000 ft)

Kedartal (also known as Shiva's lake) is a glacial lake situated at an altitude of 4,750 metres (15,580 ft) in the Garhwal region of the Himalayas in India. The lake is fed by the snowfall over Thalay Sagar (6,904 m), Meru (6,672 m), Bhrigupanth (6,772 m) and other surrounding peaks, and is the source of Kedar Ganga, which in Hindu mythology is considered to be Shiva's contribution to Bhagirathi (a source-stream of the Ganges).

Kedartal, at a distance of 17 km from Gangotri, is a popular trekking destination. Starting from Gangotri the route involves a steep rocky climb along the narrow Kedar Ganga gorge en route to Bhojkharak, 8 km away. From there it is 4 km to the next available camping site of Kedarkharak, and a further 5 km to Kedartal. The route passes through scenic Himalayan birch forests, but is made hazardous in places by falling rocks, high altitude and segments of steep ascent.

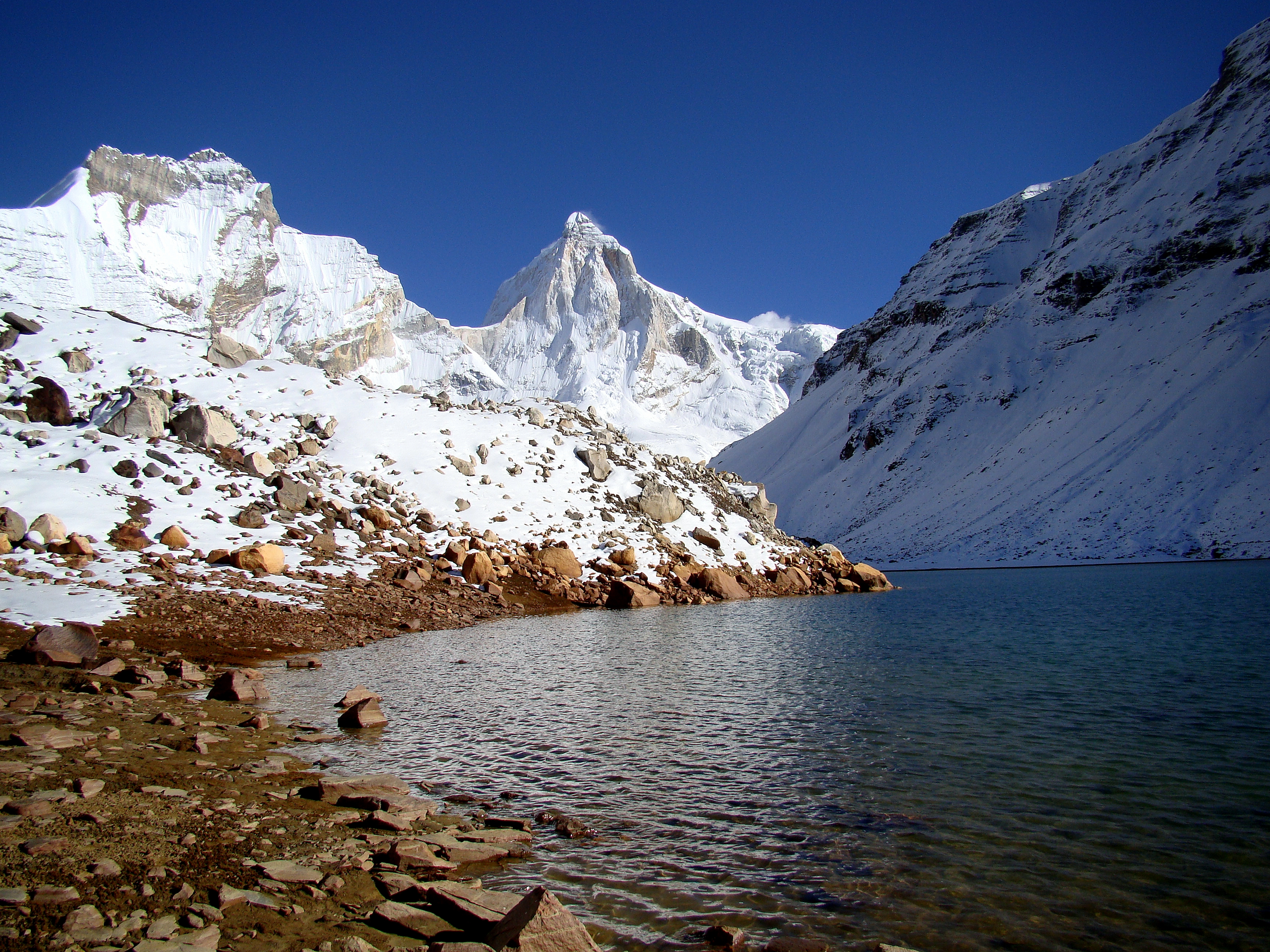
Thalay Sagar peak from Kedartal in the West

== 2026 incedent ==
On October 28, 2026, a deadly avalanche struck, killing 6.

== See also ==
- Gangotri Group
