= Srikanta =

Srikanta may refer to:

- Srikanta Acharya, Indian singer
- Srikanta Mahata, Indian politician
- Srikanta Wadiyar (born 1953), Indian prince and politician
- Srikanta (book), a Bengali novel by Sarat Chandra Chattopadhyay
- Srikanta (2017 film), an Indian Kannada-language romantic action thriller
- Srikanta (1930 film), a Bengali film based on the novel
- Srikanta (mountain), a mountain in Garhwal Himalaya

== See also ==
- Srikanth (disambiguation)
- Srikantha (disambiguation)
- Shrikant, an Indian male given name
