= Srikantha =

Srikantha may refer to:

- Shiva, a Hindu god
- Srikanta, Vishnu, a Hindu god
- Srikantha, another name of Bhavabhuti, an ancient Indian writer
- Srikantha (mountain), Uttarakhand, India
- Srikantha, East Medinipur District, a village in West Bengal, India
- Srikantha (ca. 1050), founder of Shiva Advaita philosophy
- M. Srikantha (17 September 1913 – 4 February 1982), a leading Ceylon Tamil civil servant
- Nallathamby Srikantha, a Sri Lankan Tamil politician and former Member of Parliament

== See also ==
- Srikanta (disambiguation)
- Srikanth (disambiguation)
