= Jogin II =

Mountain in Uttarakhand, India

- Location within Uttarakhand

Highest point
- Elevation: 6,342 m (20,807 ft)
- Prominence: 259 m (850 ft)
- Coordinates: 30°53′45″N 78°55′58″E

Geography
- Location: Uttarakhand, India
- Parent range: Garhwal Himalaya

Climbing
- First ascent: Asit Moitra and three Sherpas Ajiba, Nima Dorje and Ang Chhutar reached the summit On October 11, 1971.

Jogin II is a mountain of the Garhwal Himalaya in Uttarakhand India.The elevation of Jogin II is 6,342 metres (20,807 ft) and its prominence is 259 metres (850 ft). It is 110th highest located entirely within the Uttrakhand. Nanda Devi, is the highest mountain in this category. It lies 6.2 km east of Gangotri III and 7 km west of Bhrigupanth 6,772 metres (22,218 ft). It lies 2.2 km north of Jogin I. Its nearest higher neighbor is Jogin I 6,465 metres (21,211 ft). It is located 7.2 km NW of Thalay Sagar 6,904 metres (22,651 ft) and 8.5 km NW lies Gangotri I 6,682 metres (21,923 ft).

== Gangotri National Park ==
The entire surrounding area are protected within the 2,390 km^{2} (920 sq mi) Gangotri National Park, one of the largest conservation area in India. The Gangotri National Park is home to several world-class treks, including Gangotri Gomukh Tapoban Nandanvan, Kerdarnath Vasuki tal trek, Har ki dun valley trek, Badrinath to Satopanth tal trek, Gangotri to Kedar tal trek, Gangotri to Badrinath trek via Kalindi khal and many more.

== Climbing history ==
Two consecutive expedition led by Amulya Sen finally bore the success in making the first ascent of Jogin II (20,208 feet) after A previous year unsuccessful attempts. Asit Moitra and three Sherpas Ajiba, Nima Dorje and Ang Chhutar reached the summit On October 11, 1971.

A Japanese expedition led by Jushichiro Otsubo climbed Jogin I 6,465 metres (21,211 ft) and Jogin II. On August 19 Jushichiro Otsubo, Mrs. Yachiyo Yamanaka, Mrs. Kimiko Yamashita, Yukio Shiozawa, Hideaki Nara and Mrs. Kieko Tezuka reached the summit of Jogin I and on August 21, Kazutoshi Okuya and Tokuji Iida climbed to the summit of Jogin II 6,342 metres (20,807 ft).

== Neighboring and subsidiary peaks ==
neighboring or subsidiary peaks of Jogin I:

- Thalay Sagar: 6,904 m (22,651 ft)30°51′29″N 78°59′50″E
- Meru Peak: 6,660 m (21,850 ft)30°52′05″N 79°01′56″E
- Manda III: 6,529 m (21,421 ft)30°54′18″N 79°00′01″E
- Shivling: 6,543 m (21,467 ft)30°52′37″N 79°03′56″E
- Gangotri I: 6,682 m (21,923 ft)30°55′04″N 78°50′49″E
- Gangotri II: 6,590 m (21,621 ft)30°54′23″N 78°51′21″E
- Gangotri III: 6,577 m (21,578 ft)30°52′57″N 78°52′05″E

== Glaciers and rivers ==
On the eastern side lies Kedar Bamak and on the western side lies Rudugaira Bamak. Kedar Ganga emerges from Kedar bamak and joins Bhagirathi River near Gangotri. Rudugaira nala emerges from Rudugaira Bamak also joins Bhagirathi river close to Gangotri. Both the glacier drain down to Bhagirathi River near Gangotri. One of the main tributaries of river Ganga. Bhagirathi joins the Alaknanda River the other main tributaries of river Ganga at Dev Prayag and called Ganga there after.

== See also ==
- List of Himalayan peaks of Uttarakhand
