= Gangotri Group =

Group of mountains in the Himalayas

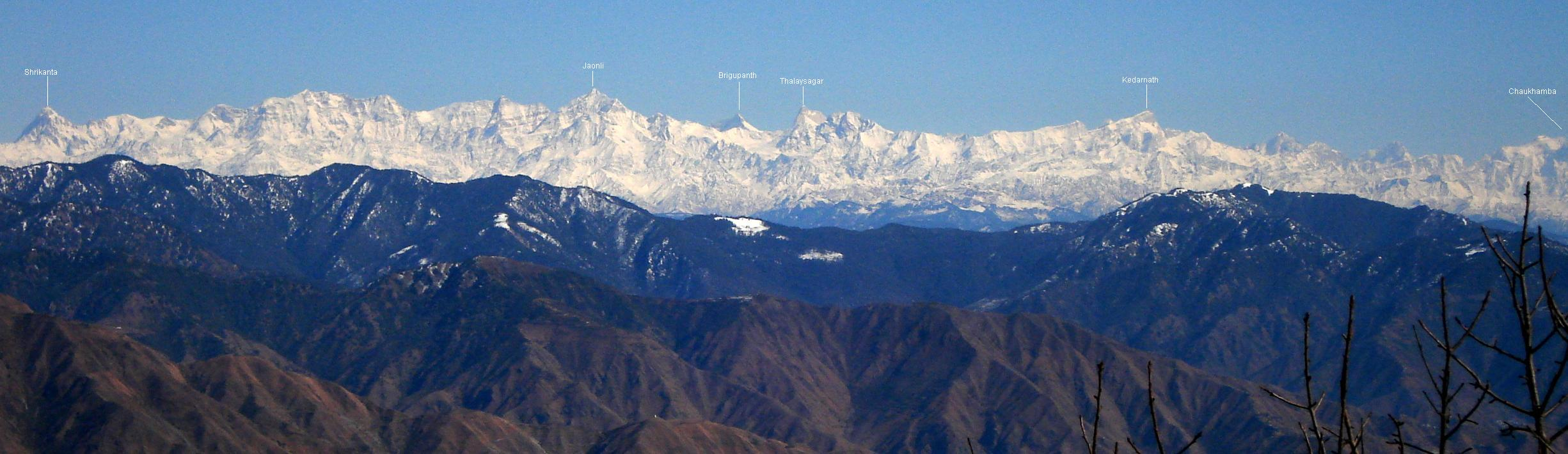
- A photograph of Gangotri Group (including Bhrigupanth, Thalaysagar and Kedarnath) as viewed from Benog tibba, Mussorrie ( 30°28'36.56"N, 78° 0'51.17"E).

Geography
- Location: Garhwal, Uttarakhand, India

The Gangotri Group of mountains is a subdivision of the Garhwal Himalaya in the northern Indian state of Uttarakhand. It rings the Gangotri Glacier, and contains peaks that are notable either for their religious significance to Hindus, for their difficult climbing routes, or both. Climbs on three of the peaks (Thalay Sagar, Shivling, and Meru) have resulted in the awarding of the prestigious (but controversial) climbing award, the Piolet d'Or.

Notable mountains include:

- Chaukhamba (I-IV). A four-summited massif; Chaukhamba I, 7,138 m (23,419 ft), is the highest peak in the group.
- Kedarnath (Mountain), 6,940 m (22,769 ft), the highest peak on the southwest side of the glacier
- Thalay Sagar, 6,904 m (22,651 ft), a steep rock spire, and perhaps the most difficult summit to attain in the entire group.
- Shivling, 6,543 m (21,467 ft), another steep rock peak, with two summits, and the most striking as viewed from Gaumukh, the pilgrimage site at the mouth of the glacier. A symbol of the god Shiva, it is the most revered peak in the group.
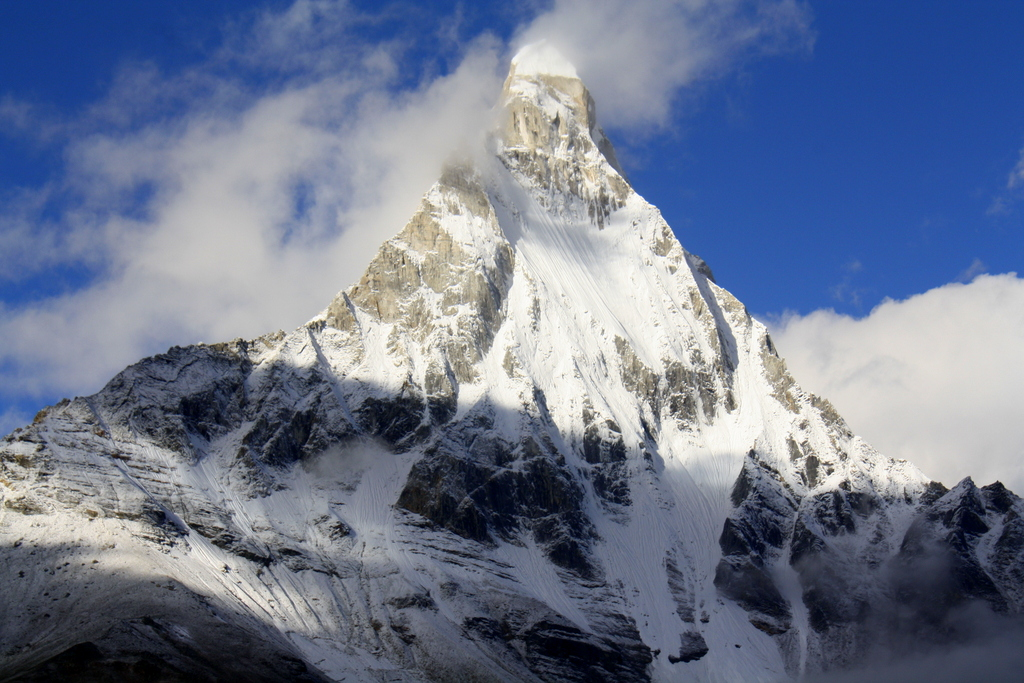
  Mt.Shivling
- Meru, 6,660 m (21,850 ft), lies between Thalay Sagar and Shivling, and has some highly challenging routes, only recently ascended despite multiple attempts by the world's best climbers.
- Bhagirathi I: 6,856 metres (22,493 ft); II: 6,512 metres (21,365 ft); III: 6,454 m (21,175 ft), peaks with moderate routes on the back sides, but huge steep-to-overhanging cliffs on the side facing the glacier. Bhagirathi III, in particular, has seen some of the most extreme rock climbing in the Himalaya.

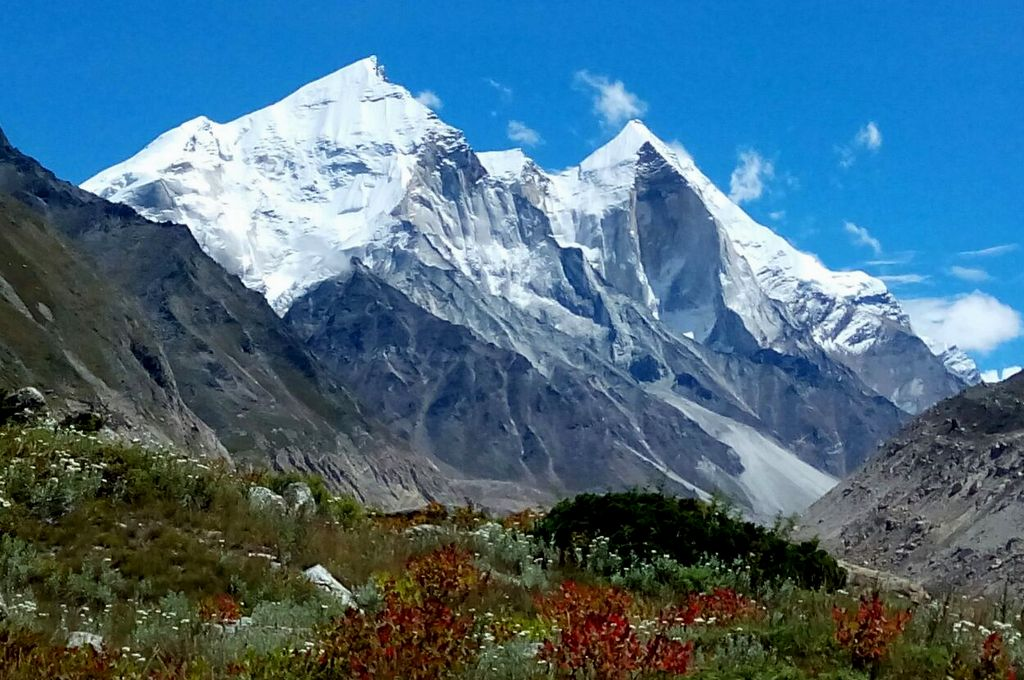
Bhagirathi II, III and I
