= 2026 Kedartal avalanche =

Deadly avalanche in Uttarakhand, India

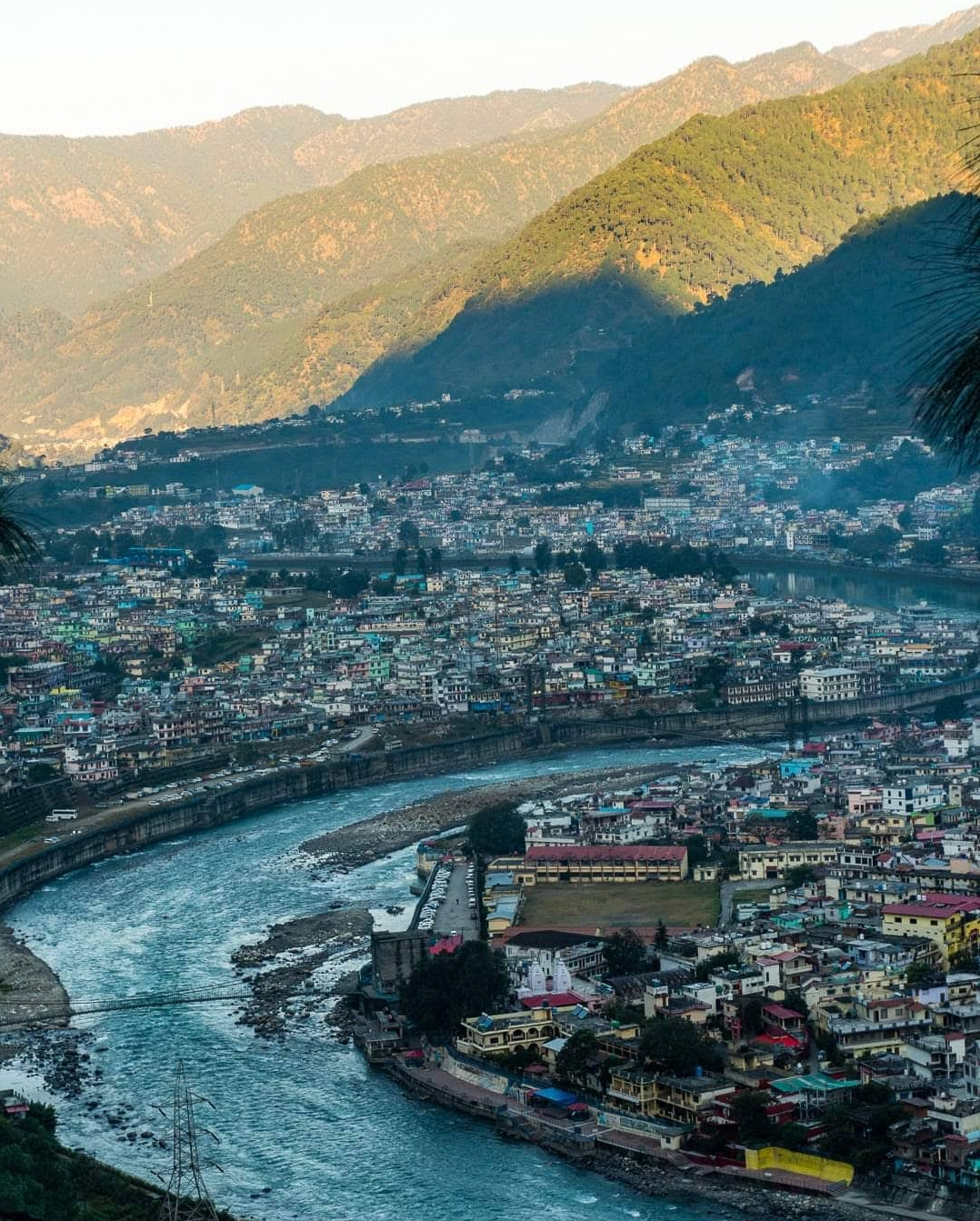
- Uttarkashi, the city that was affected by this event

Meteorological history
- Date: October 29, 2026

Overall effects
- Fatalities: 6
- Injuries: Unknown
- Missing: 2
- Areas affected: Uttarkashi district, Uttarakhand, India

On October 29, 2026, an avalanche struck near the city of Uttarkashi, Uttarakhand, India. Primarily affecting the area around Kedartal, the avalanche left eight trekkers missing. Rescue efforts were hampered by heavy snowfall and avalanche conditions. On November 3, two bodies were recovered while six trekkers remained missing. The next day, two more bodies were identified as sisters from Lucknow, bringing the death toll to four. Two youths from Bankura district in West Bengal were also among the recovered victims. By November 5, six bodies had been recovered and two trekkers remained missing.

== Search operations ==
The search was suspended due to snowfall and adverse weather. Resumption of search was taken up on 3 November.Two bodies of the eight missing trekkers were found and six trekkers remained missing. Four bodies of the eight missing trekkers were found on 4 November. Two bodies of the eight missing trekkers were found by the rescue teams and the search was underway for other missing persons. The district magistrate monitored the rescue operations as State Disaster Response Force and National Disaster Response Force teams fought snow and bad weather.
