= Srikanth =

Srikanth or Sreekanth is a common Indian first name. Śrīkaṇṭha in Hindu scriptures is primarily an epithet of Vishnu. Sree refers to the Hindu goddess, MahaLakshmi and kanth in Sanskrit means husband or consort. Thus, Sreekanth or Srikanth refers to Vishnu, the consort of goddess Lakshmi. Vishnu is one of the members of the trinity of Hindu gods. Brahma creates life, Vishnu preserves it and Shiva destroys it.

Some popular personalities with this name include:

- Srikanth (actor, born 1940), Tamil film actor active in films from 1965
- Srikanth (actor, born 1979), Tamil actor active in films after 2002
- Srikanth (actor, born 1968), Telugu actor who debuted in films in 1991
- Srikanth Iyengar, Telugu actor who acted in 2010s
- Krishnamachari Srikkanth, Indian cricketer

== See also ==
- Srikanth (film), a 2024 Indian film by Tushar Hiranandani
- Srikanta (disambiguation)
- Srikantha (disambiguation)
