= Shrikant =

Shrikant is a male Indian given name.

== People with the name ==
- Shrikant Bhasi (born 1968), Indian businessman
- Shrikant Jadhav (born 1960), Indian cricketer
- Shrikant Jichkar (1954–2004), Indian politician
- Shrikant Joshi (born 1958), Indian businessman
- Shrikant Kalyani (born 1964), Indian cricketer
- Shrikant Lele (born 1943), Indian engineer
- Shrikant Mundhe (born 1988), Indian cricketer
- Shrikant Narayan (born 1968), Indian singer
- Shrikant Shah (born 1936), Indian poet and novelist
- Shrikant Sharma, Indian politician
- Shrikant Shinde (born 1987), Indian politician
- Shrikant Verma (1931–1986), Indian poet and politician
- Shrikant Wagh (born 1988), Indian cricketer
- Shrikant Yadav, Indian cricketer
- Shrikant Thokchom (born 2002), Artist and Politician

== See also ==
- Srikanta (disambiguation)
