= Bhilangna River =

River in Uttarakhand, India

Coordinates: 30°24′N 78°29′E

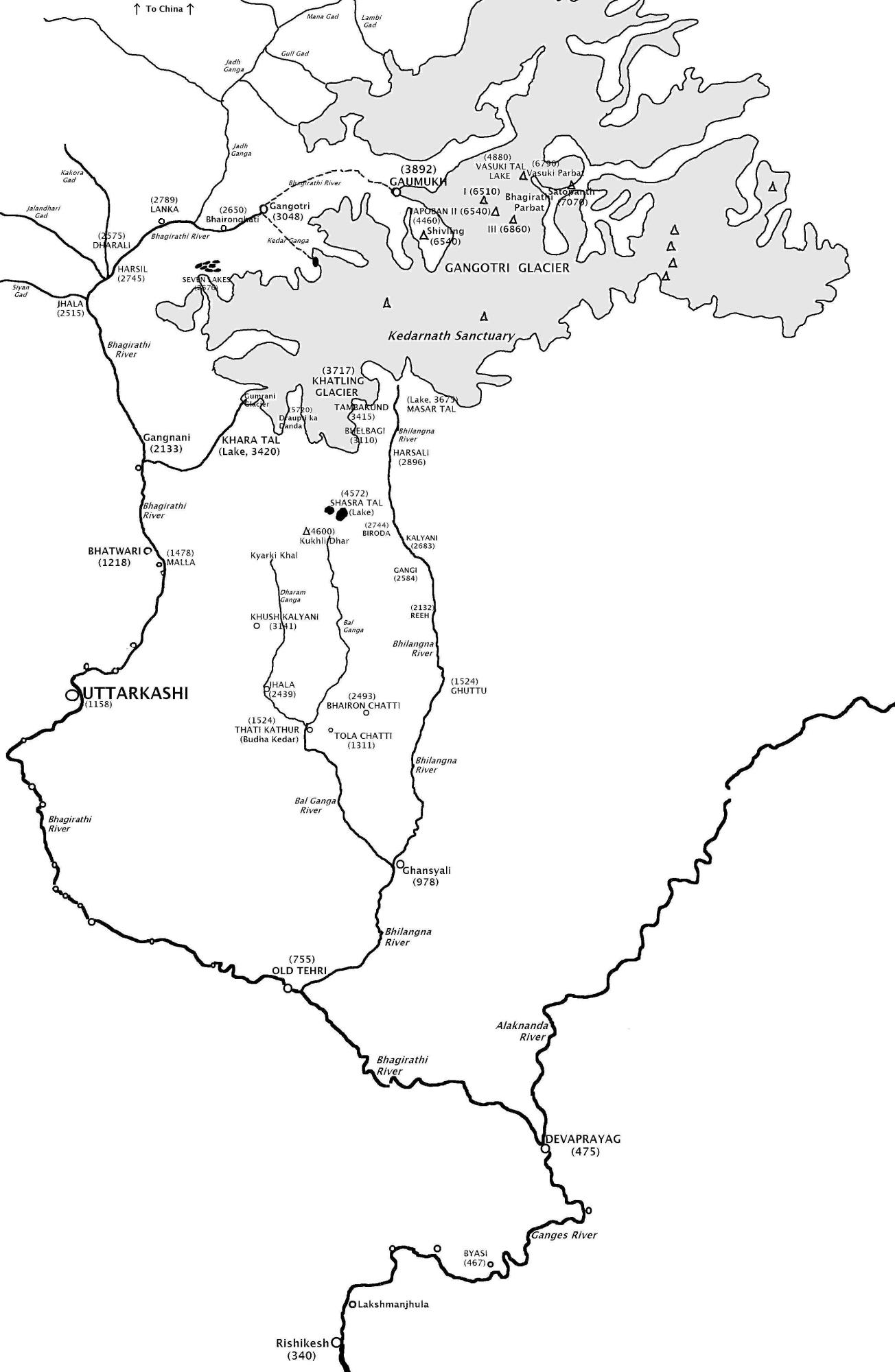
Bhagirathi river map

Bhilangna River is a Himalayan river in Uttarakhand, India, which is the major tributary of the Bhagirathi river, the source stream of the Ganges River of India. Bhilangana is a combination of Bhil and Ganga.

The mainstem, Bhilangna, rises at the foot of the Khatling Glacier (elevation 3,717 m (12,195 ft)) approximately 50 km (31 mi) south of the ice cave at Gaumukh, traditionally considered the source of both the Bhagirathi and the Ganges and flows into the Bhagirathi at Old Tehri, the site of the Tehri dam. It meets its major tributary the Bal Ganga at Ghansali (elevation 976 m (3,202 ft)).

The Bal Ganga, whose headwaters are formed at the foot of Mount Kukhli Dhar (elevation 4,600 m (15,100 ft)), itself has a minor tributary, the Dharam Ganga, which meets it at Thati Kathur (also Budha Kedar) at elevation 1,524 m (5,000 ft).

The Khatling trek route passes alongside the Bhilangna, starting from the last point accessible by road, Ghuttu, until the glacier, which stands at 3700 metres. If one were to go further on the trail past the glacier, one could reach Kedarnath.

== See also ==
- Bhagirathi River
- Ganges
- Alaknanda River
