= Manda III =

Mountain in Uttarakhand, India

- Location within Uttarakhand

Highest point
- Elevation: 6,529 m (21,421 ft)
- Prominence: 450 m (1,480 ft)
- Coordinates: 30°54′18″N 79°00′01″E

Geography
- Location: Uttarakhand, India
- Parent range: Garhwal Himalaya

Climbing
- First ascent: On September 22, 1992 A four member team of Dalriada Climbing Club, Ireland.

Manda III is a mountain of the Garhwal Himalaya in Uttarakhand India. The elevation of Manda III is 6,529 metres (21,421 ft) and its prominence is 450 metres (1,476 ft). It is joint 81st highest located entirely within the Uttarakhand. Nanda Devi, is the highest mountain in this category. It lies 2.4 km south of Manda II 6,568 metres (21,549 ft) and 2.8 km north of Bhrigupanth 6,772 metres (22,218 ft). It lies 6.6 km east of Jogin II 6,342 metres (20,807 ft). It is located 6.7 km NW of Shivling (mountain) 6,543 metres (21,467 ft) and 13.1 km east lies Bhagirathi Parbat II 6,512 metres (21,365 ft).

== Climbing history ==
A four-member team of Dalriada Climbing Club, Ireland comprising Andy Cunningham, Richard Mansfield, Gary Murray and Ian Rea climbed Manda III via the southeast flank and southwest ridge. On September 22, they reached the summit in alpine-style it took five days from base camp and to descend. According to them this was the first ascent. A previous British attempt at the peak from the northwest face and north ridge in 1986 failed at 6100 meters.

== Neighboring and subsidiary peaks ==
neighboring or subsidiary peaks of Manda III:

- Thalay Sagar: 6,904 m (22,651 ft)30°51′29″N 78°59′50″E
- Meru Peak: 6,660 m (21,850 ft)30°52′05″N 79°01′56″E
- Shivling: 6,543 m (21,467 ft)30°52′37″N 79°03′56″E
- Gangotri I: 6,682 m (21,923 ft)30°55′04″N 78°50′49″E
- Gangotri II: 6,590 m (21,621 ft)30°54′23″N 78°51′21″E
- Gangotri III: 6,577 m (21,578 ft)30°52′57″N 78°52′05″E
- Jogin II: 6,342 m (20,807 ft)30°53′45″N 78°55′58″E

== Glaciers and rivers ==
On the western side lies Kedar Bamak and on the eastern side lies Bhrigupanth Bamak. Kedar Ganga emerges from Kedar bamak and joins Bhagirathi River near Gangotri. Bhrigupanth Bamak drain down to Bhagirathi River near Bhojwas. Bhagirathi joins the Alaknanda River the other main tributaries of river Ganga at Dev Prayag and called Ganga there after.

== See also ==
- List of Himalayan peaks of Uttarakhand
