= Bhrigupanth =

Mountain in Uttarakhand, India

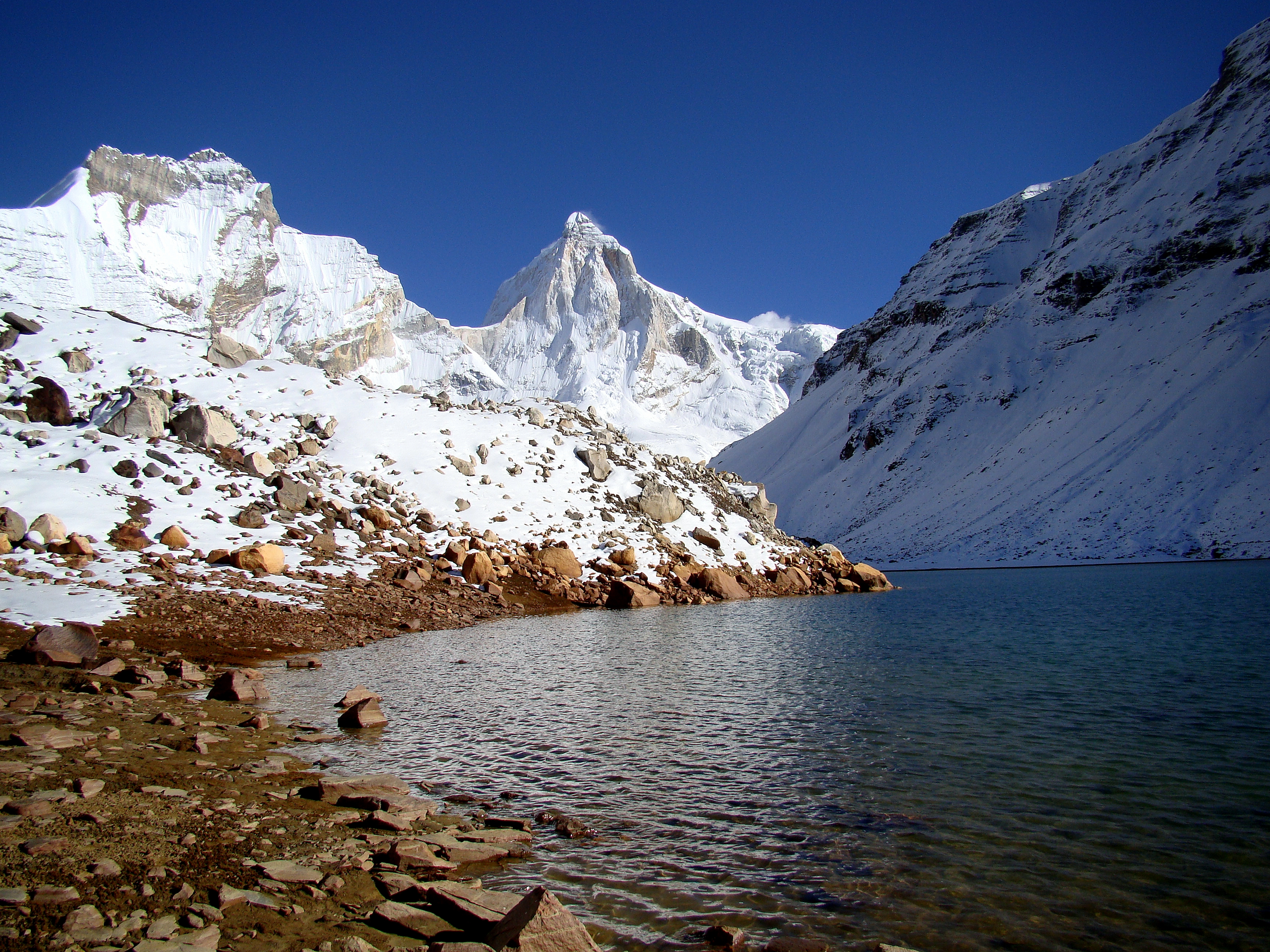
- Bhrigupanth and Thalay sagar from left

Highest point
- Elevation: 6,772 m (22,218 ft)
- Prominence: 268 m (879 ft)
- Listing: Mountains of Uttarakhand
- Coordinates: 30°52′50″N 79°00′10″E

Geography
- Location within Uttarakhand
- Location: Uttarakhand, India
- Parent range: Garhwal Himalaya

Climbing
- First ascent: 1980 by Indian American Women's expedition led by Arlene Blum by the south face.

Bhrigupanth (Hindi: भृगुपंत) is a mountain of Garhwal Himalaya in Uttarakhand, India. It stands at 6,772 metres (22,218 ft). It is the 38th highest located entirely within Uttarakhand. Nanda Devi is the highest mountain in this category. Bhrigupanth is the 525th highest peak in the world. It is located northeast of Thalay Sagar 6904 m, northwest of Meru Peak 6660 m and south of Manda III 6529 m.

== Climbing history ==
There are many attempts on this peak, few of them successful. Below is a list of successful attempts.

- First ascent of Bhrigupanth happened in 1980 by Indian American Women's expedition led by Arlene Blum via south face.
- A seven member Japanese team of the Senshu Alpine Club, Osaka, led by K. Yakamura, successful by the south face in 1982.
- In 1983 an 11-member Taiwanese team led by Huang Lee Chun-Jung. climbed from the west face. Climb followed by a tragedy death of two members and Sherpa Ang Pasang.
- In 1987 a 10-member Polish team from Warsaw made the first ascent of the west pillar route led by R. Kolakowski. They descended by the south face route.
- In 1988 a 6-member Spanish team led by J. Vicente climbed the peak.

== Glaciers and rivers ==
It is surrounded by Glaciers on all the side Kedar Bamak, on the western side, Bhrigupanth Bamak on the eastern side and Kirti Bamak on the south east. The famous Kedar Tal is near Kedar Bamak. Kedar Ganga emerges from Kedar Bamak and it merges with Bhagirathi river at Gangotri.

== Neighboring peaks ==
The neighboring peaks of Bhrigupanth:

- Thalay Sagar: 6,904 m (22,651 ft)30°51′29″N 78°59′50″E
- Meru Peak: 6,660 m (21,850 ft)30°52′05″N 79°01′56″E
- Manda III: 6,529 m (21,421 ft)30°54′18″N 79°00′01″E
- Shivling: 6,543 m (21,467 ft)30°52′37″N 79°03′56″E
- Jogin: 6,465 m (21,211 ft)30°52′42″N 78°55′31″E
