= Gangotri National Park =

Indian national park

- IUCN category II (national park)
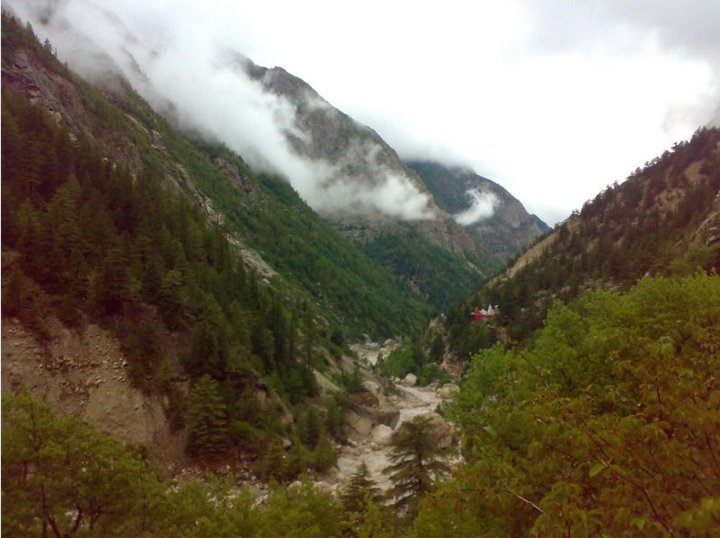

- Location within Uttarakhand Location within India
- Interactive map of Gangotri National Park
- Location: Uttarkashi District Uttarakhand, India
- Nearest city: Uttarkashi
- Coordinates: 31°38′N 79°33′E
- Area: 2,390 km^{2} (920 sq mi)
- Governing body: Forest Department, Government of Uttarakhand

Gangotri National Park is a national park in Uttarkashi District in Uttarakhand state of India, covering about 1,553 km^{2} (600 sq mi). Its habitat consists of coniferous forests, alpine meadows and glaciers. Gomukh at Gangotri glacier, the origin of the river Ganga, is located inside the park. Gangotri National Park was established in 1989.

== Flora ==
The park harbors Western Himalayan subalpine conifer forests at lower elevations and Western Himalayan alpine shrub and meadows at higher elevations. Vegetation consist of chirpine deodar, fir, spruce, oak and rhododendrons.

== Fauna ==
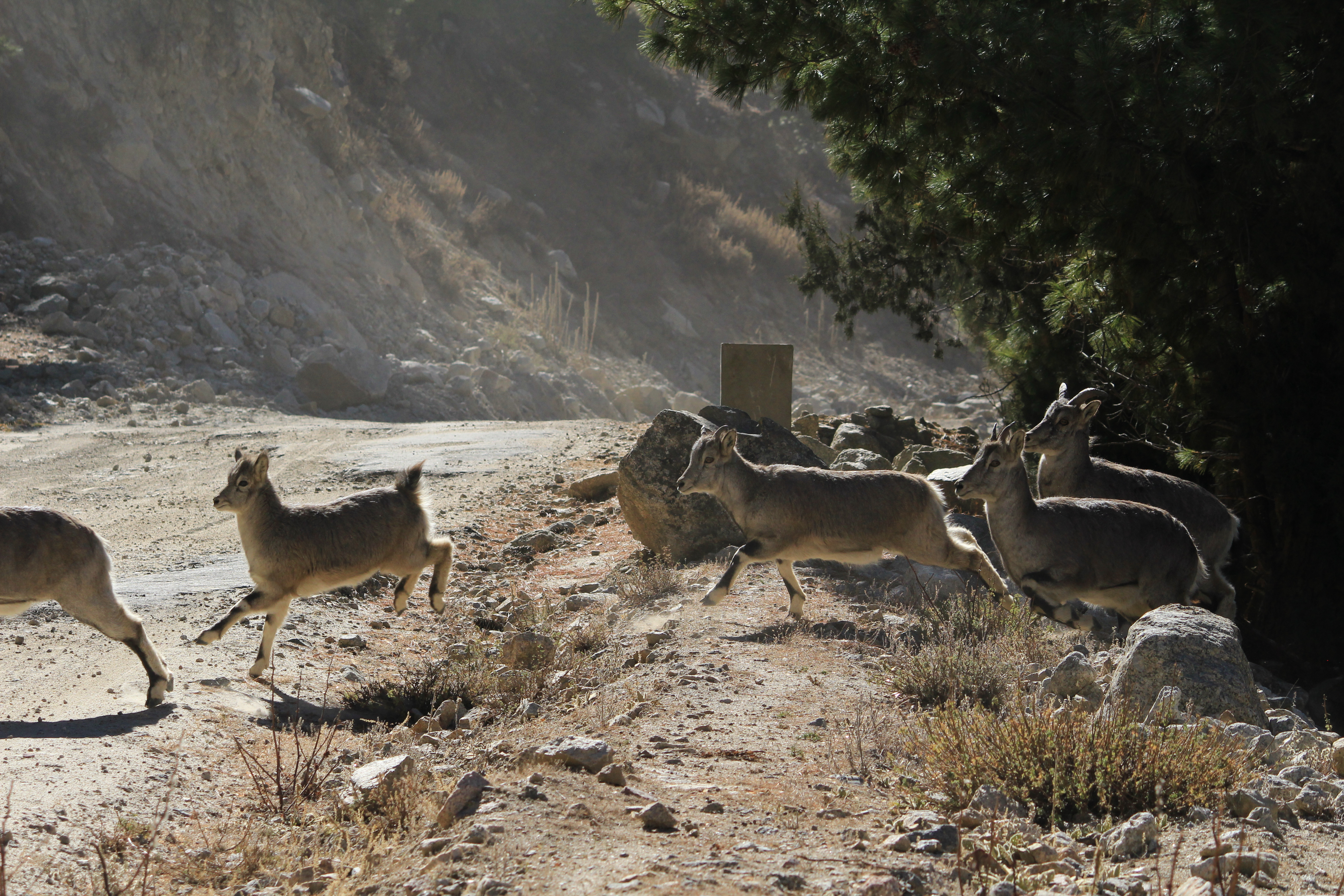
Blue sheep in Gangotri National Park

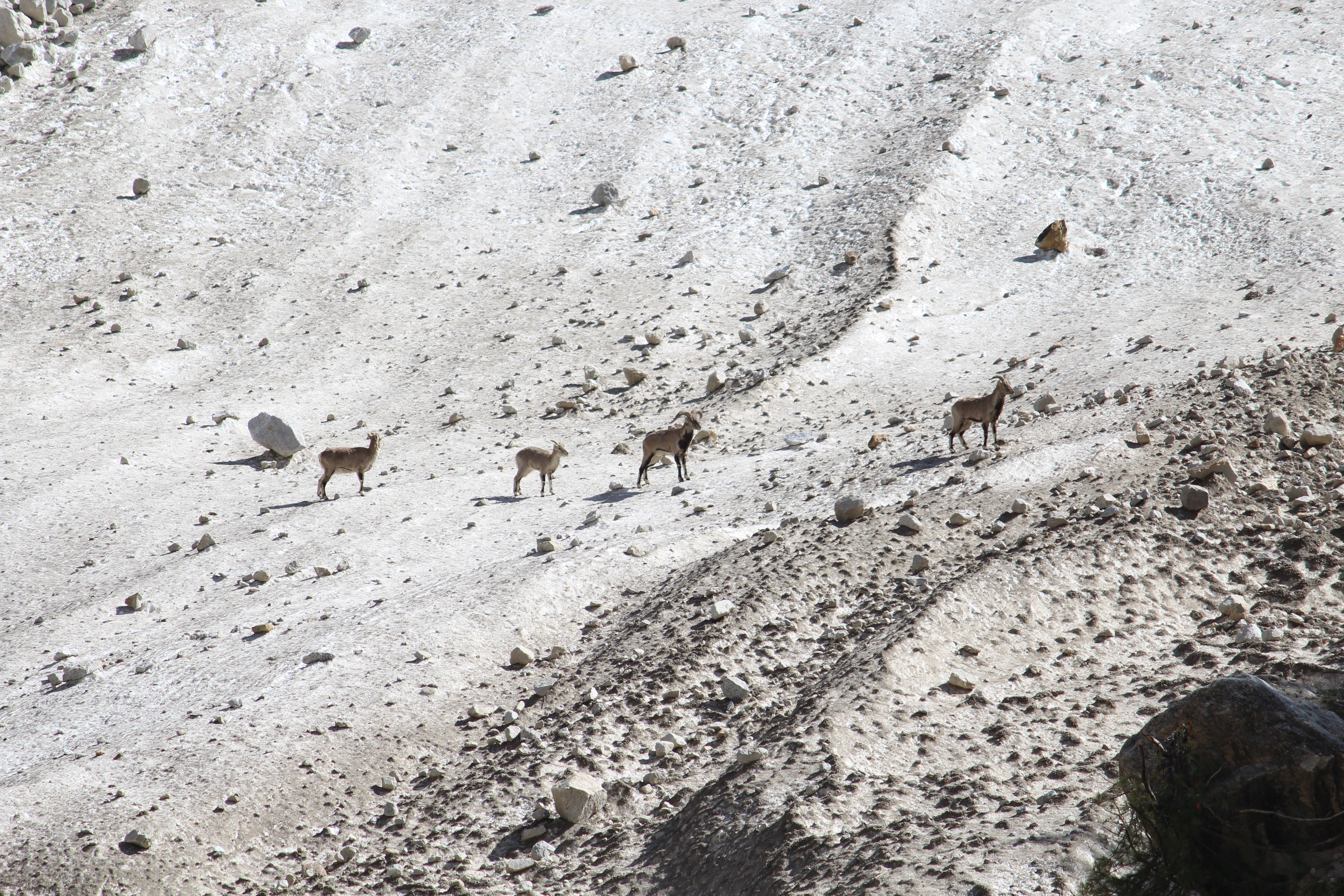
Blue sheep

Gangotri National Park is home to the snow leopard. To date, 15 mammal species and 150 bird species have been documented in the park, including Asian black bear (Ursus thibetanus), brown bear (Ursus arctos), musk deer (Moschus chrysogaster), blue sheep (Pseudois nayaur), Himalayan tahr (Hemitragus jemlahicus), Himalayan monal (Lophophorus impejanus), Koklass (Pucrasia macrolopha) and Himalayan snowcock (Tetraogallus himalayensis), pheasants, partridges, doves, and pigeons.

In September 2017, while leading a BSF mountaineering expedition in Gangotri National Park, six-time Everest summiteer Loveraj Singh Dharamshaktu discovered that the blue sheep (bharal) were losing their eyesight.

== Geography ==
Gangotri National Park (GNP) (Long. 78°45’ to 79°02’ East and Lat 30°50’ to 31°12’ North) is located in the upper catchment of Bhagirathi river in the Uttarkashi District of Uttarakhand State, India. The northeastern park boundary is located along the international boundary with China. It falls under the Biogeographical zone – 2A West Himalaya (Rodgers and Panwar, 1988) and covers an area of 2,390 km², including a considerable stretch of snow-clad mountains and glaciers. The Gaumukh glacier, the origin of river Ganges is located inside the park. The Gangotri, after which the park has been named, is one of the holy shrines of Hindus. The park area forms a viable continuity between Govind National Park and Kedarnath Wildlife Sanctuary. High ridges, deep gorges, precipitous cliffs, rocky craggy glaciers, and narrow valleys characterize the area. There is a high variation in the elevation gradients from 1,800 to 7,083m, which in turn reflects in the diverse biomes, from subtropical communities to alpine meadows.

== Ecology ==
Gangotri National Park is typical of high altitude ecosystems, with decisive influence from Trans Himalayan elements in both physical and biological characteristics. The landscape is dominated by alpine scrub, although forests of kharsu oak and betula are observed in patches in lower and higher elevation areas respectively. The mountain sides along the entire route from Gangotri to Gaumukh are steeper and are distinctly broken up by consequential landslides. These landslides appear to have caused irreversible isolation between forest patches including the alpine vegetation. The impact of these natural events on the forest and the dependent organisms is important to document, so as to assess the long-term value of this park in the wildlife perspective. The ground vegetation, although drying, is suggestive of high ground biomass in this area, and the recorded ground vegetative cover ranges from 10 to 50% (average = 25%).
