= Thalay Sagar =

Mountain in indian himalayas

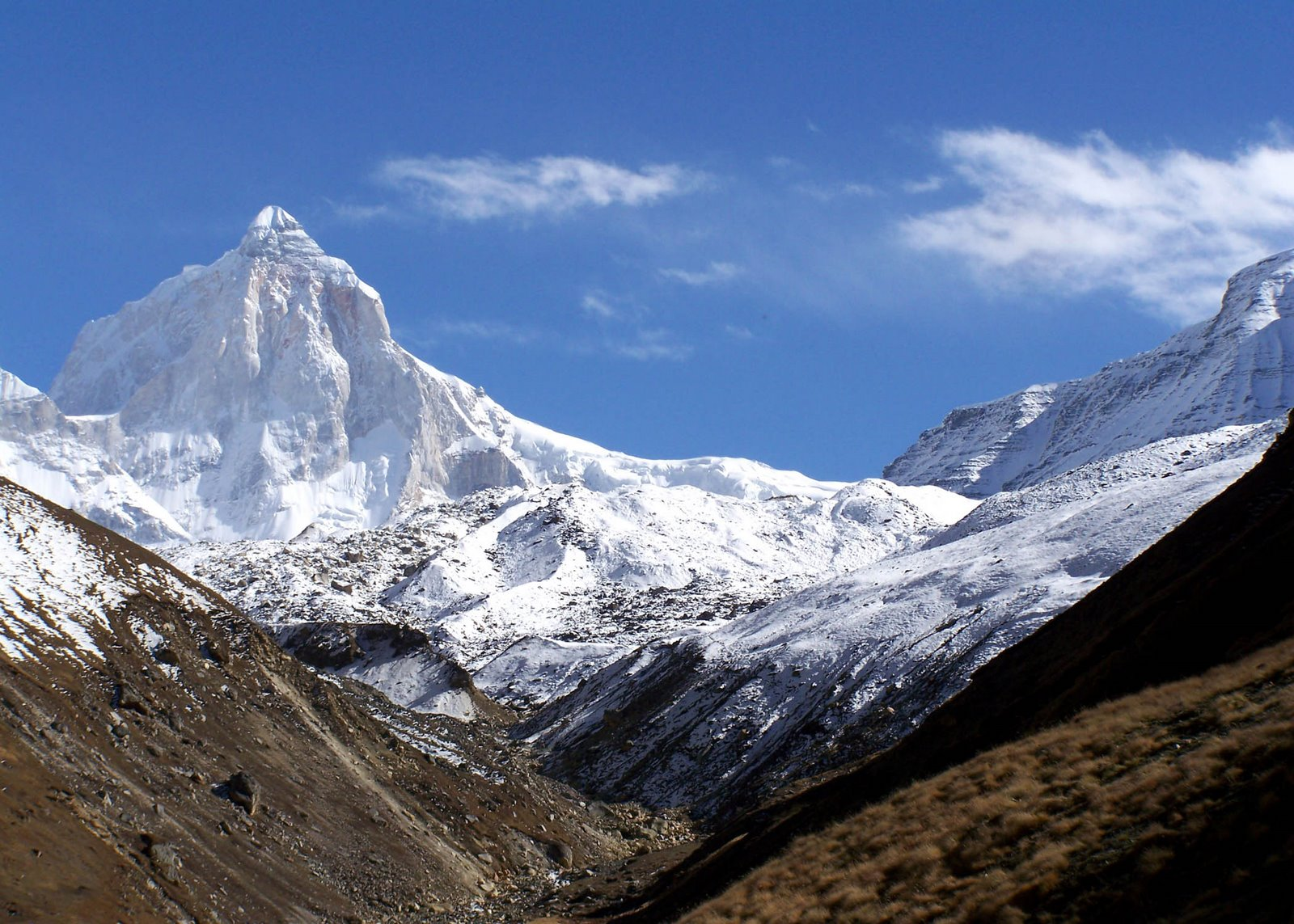
- View of Thalaysagar en route Kedartal

Highest point
- Elevation: 6,904 m (22,651 ft)
- Prominence: 1,000 m (3,280 ft)
- Coordinates: 30°51′29″N 78°59′50″E

Geography
- Location within India
- Location: Uttarakhand, India
- Parent range: Gangotri Group, Garhwal Himalayas

Climbing
- First ascent: 24 June 1979 by Roy Kligfield, John Thackray, Pete Thexton
- Easiest route: Northwest couloir and ridge: technical rock/snow/ice climb

Thalay Sagar is a mountain in the Gangotri Group of peaks in the western Garhwal Himalayas, on the main ridge that lies south of the Gangotri Glacier. It lies in the northern Indian state of Uttarakhand, 10 kilometres (6 mi) southwest of the Hindu holy site of Gaumukh (the source of the Bhagirathi River). It is the second highest peak on the south side of the Gangotri Glacier (after Kedarnath), but it is more notable for being a dramatic rock peak, steep on all sides, and a famed prize for mountaineers. It is adjacent to the Jogin group of peaks, and has the lake Kedartal at its base.

== Climbing history ==
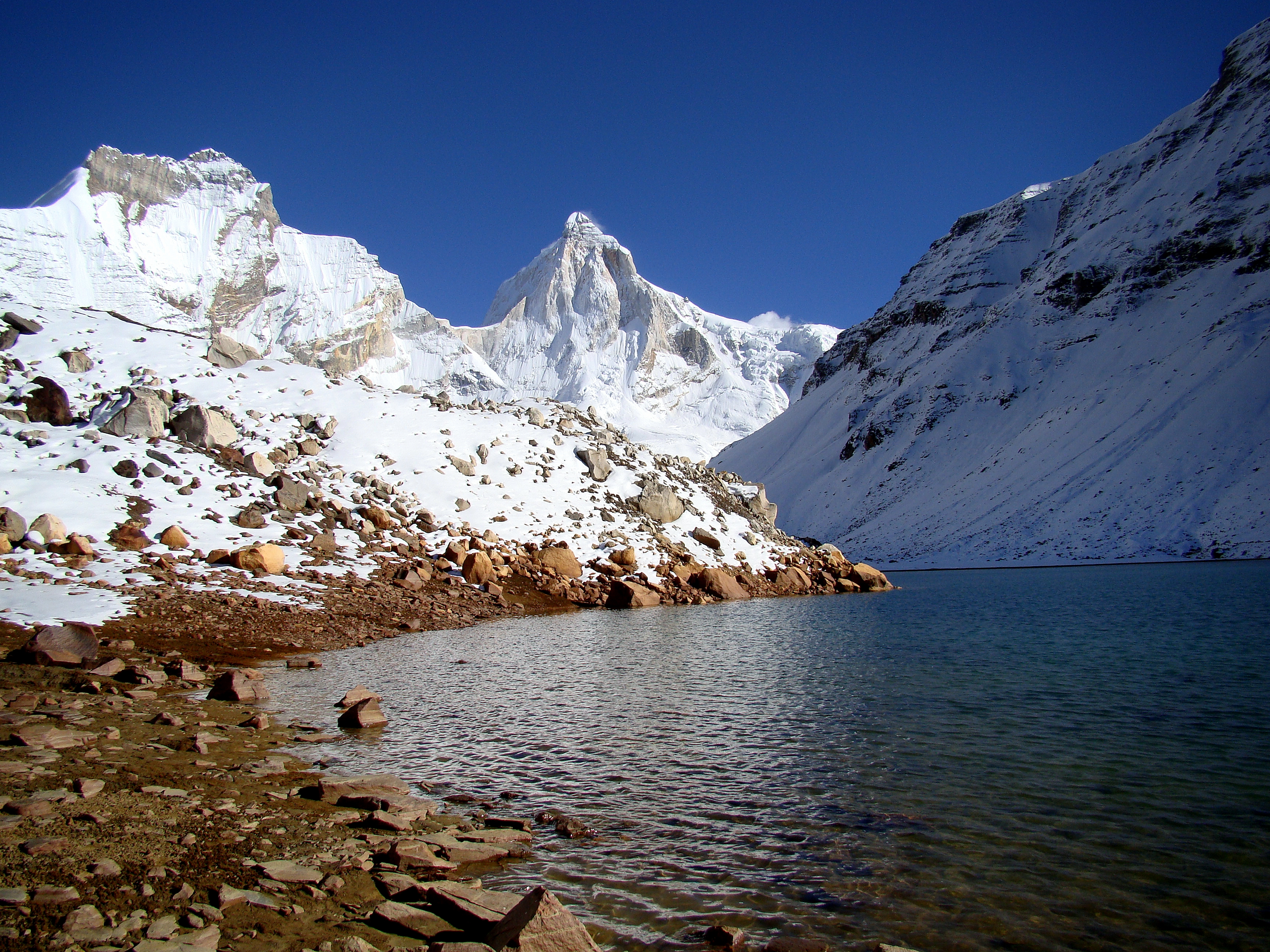
Thalay Sagar from Kedartal in the West

For military and geopolitical reasons foreign climbers were not permitted into most of the Garhwal region until the late 1970s. It was first climbed on 24 June 1979 via the northwest couloir and ridge and thence across the shale band of the North Face by an Anglo-American team comprising Roy Kligfield, John Thackray, and Pete Thexton.

Since the first ascent, many other routes have been climbed on the peak, some of which have been test pieces of modern mountaineering. There have been at least 15 ascents by at least 9 different routes. The north face of the peak, in particular, has been climbed by five different routes, some more direct than others. The key difficulty in the direct routes is a notorious band of shale near the summit, which presents rotten and dangerous rock. The first route to climb directly through the shale band, instead of finishing on one of the ridges, was the Australian Route pioneered by Andrew Lindblade and Athol Whimp; it involves 1,400 m (4,600 ft) of climbing and is graded VII 5.9 WI5. Their climb was awarded the Piolet d'Or in 1999.

The first ascent of the Thalay Sagar NE face to the SE ridge was made by the Dutch team of Melvin Redeker, Mike Van Berkel and Cas Van de Gevel. They climbed in an 11-day push from base camp to summit, including time spent waiting out bad weather. The Dutch climbers were the eighth team that reached the summit.

In 2008 the first successful Indian ascent was accomplished by Basanta Singha Roy the famous climber from Mountaineers Association Of Krishnanagar(MAK), West Bengal, India, along with three sherpas (Pemba sherpa, pasangh sherpa & Phurba sherpa).

On 22 July 2012 Tusi Das, a 28-year-old woman climber from Kolkata summited the peak. She was the sole climber in the five-member women's team from the Alipore-based Kolkata Albatross Adventure Society to reach the summit. It was the first woman ascent to Mt Thalay Sagar recorded so far.
