= Meru Peak =

Mountain in India

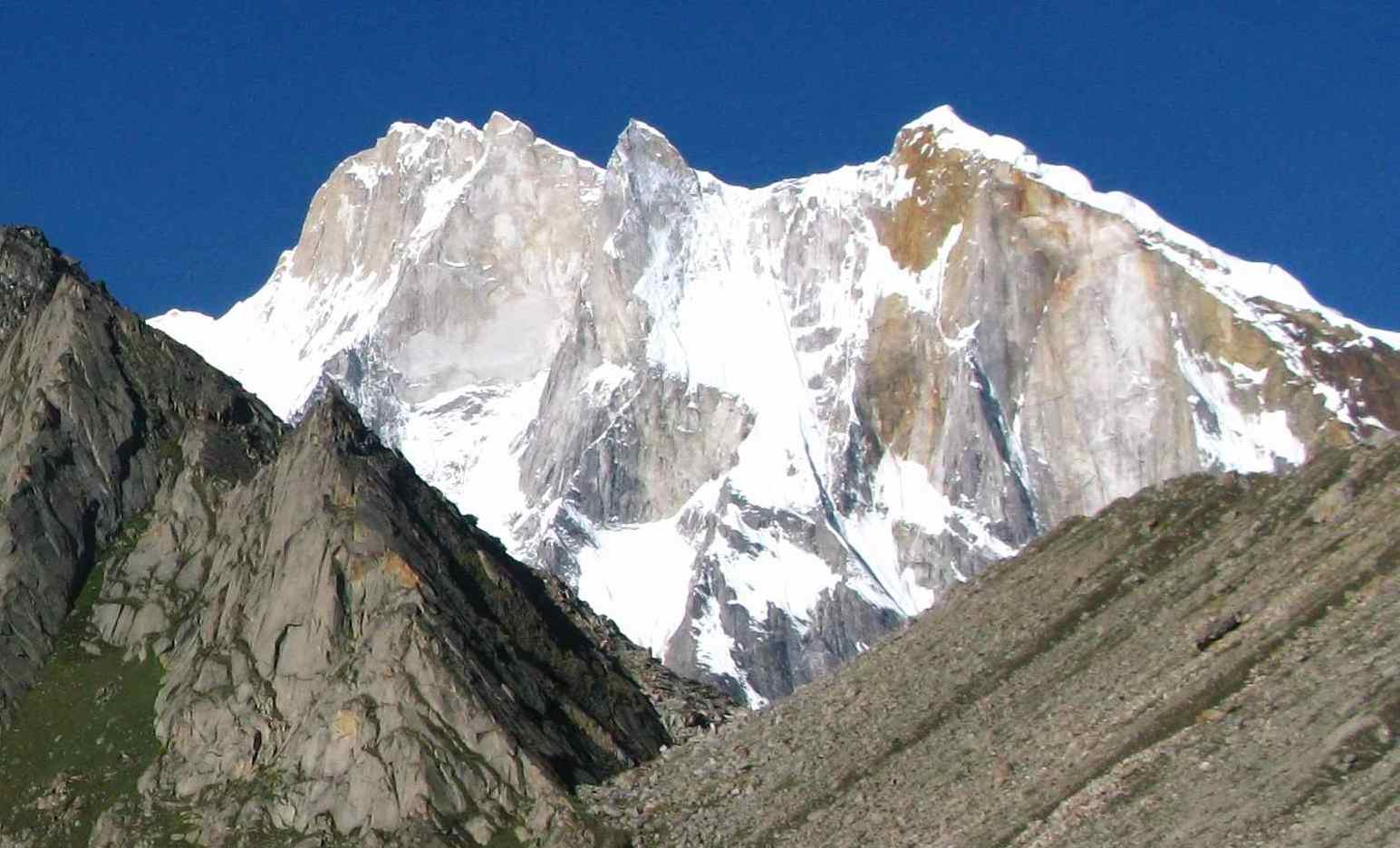
- Meru's three peaks from left to right: Southern, Central, and Northern. The Shark's Fin is just left of the wide snow slope in the centre.

Highest point
- Elevation: 6,660 m (21,850 ft)
- Prominence: 502 m (1,647 ft)
- Coordinates: 30°52′5″N 79°1′56″E

Geography
- Location within India
- Location: Gangotri National Park, Uttarakhand, India
- Parent range: Himalayas

Meru Peak is a mountain located in the Garhwal Himalayas, in the state of Uttarakhand in India. The 6,660-metre (21,850 ft) peak lies between Thalay Sagar and Shivling, and has some highly challenging routes. The name Meru likely originated from the Sanskrit word for "peak".

The mountain was formerly the site of the world's highest BASE jump from a location on the surface of the Earth by Glenn Singleman and Heather Swan, from a height of 6,604 metres (21,667 ft), in June 2006, a record which has since been surpassed by Valery Rozov's 2013 jump from the North Face of Mount Everest.

The mountain has three distinct peaks: southern (6,660 metres; 21,850 ft), central (6,310 metres; 20,700 ft), and northern (6,450 metres; 21,160 ft). The two higher peaks were climbed earlier than the harder central peak, which was first climbed in a 2001 solo ascent by Valery Babanov, twice by other teams in 2006, and for the first time along the "Shark's Fin" route in 2011.

== Shark's Fin route ==
This 1400m route to Meru Central follows the North East Pillar, over the "Shark's Fin", a massive granite feature on the northeast face variously described as a "prow", "blade" or "nose". Its exceptional difficulty is exacerbated by the fact that its most technical rock climbing is near the top, meaning that heavy gear needs to be carried almost all the way. It has been described as "one of the most attempted and most coveted lines in the entire Himalaya" and "one of the last remaining challenges of big wall mountaineering."

The route begins after a two-day approach, a 700m snow slope and a rock ramp. Next is a steep, overhanging wall nicknamed the "Indian Ocean Wall", climbed with aid techniques up to A4 difficulty. This is followed by the "Crystal Pitch", an overhanging and exposed section of aid climbing. The last section combines mixed and aid climbing.

=== Attempts ===
American Mugs Stump attempted the route in 1986, thwarted by an avalanche on the lower slopes. In 1988, he tried and failed again, defeated by a lengthy snow storm.

A serious attempt was made by the primarily British team of Paul Pritchard, Johnny Dawes, Noel Craine, Dave Kendall and Philip Lloyd in 1993. This failure included Dawes losing a boot, and later having a major fall.

Further unsuccessful attempts followed in the 1990s, including that of Scott Backes. In 1997, Nick Bullock, Jules Cartwright and Jamie Fisher achieved a height of 6,100m.

Pete Takeda and Dave Sheldon made three attempts, in 1998, 1999 and 2001, all unsuccessful.

In 2001, Russian Valery Babanov climbed the bottom part of the route to 5,800m before descending. He summited via a different route, which became known as "Shangri-La", later the same year. This was the first time Meru Central had been summited, by any route.

In 2003, Americans Conrad Anker, Doug Chabot and Bruce Miller completed the bottom part of the wall, before veering off onto ice flutings, then eventually turning back.

In 2004, Japanese climbers Hiroyoshi Manome, Yasushi Okada, Makoto Kuroda, and Yasuhiro Hanatani failed after an accident injured one of the team members. The same team attempted the climb again in 2006, but departed the Shark's Fin to reach the summit.

In October 2006, Czech climbers Marek Holecek and Jan Kreisinger attempted the route, but departed the ridge halfway up to successfully pursue an easier route to the summit.

In 2008, the team of Conrad Anker, Jimmy Chin, and Renan Ozturk climbed to within two pitches (150m) of the summit before turning back. They had experienced severe storms, forcing them to spend four days in the portaledge, depleting their food supplies.

In 2009, Slovenians Silvo Karo, Marko Lukic and Andrej Grmovsek unsuccessfully attempted the route, turning around at the base of the headwall, due to insufficient gear, poor acclimatisation and an Alpine-style approach.

The first successful climb of the route was made in October 2011 by Conrad Anker, Jimmy Chin, and Renan Ozturk, the same team that had narrowly failed in 2008. The attempt was made only 5 months after Ozturk suffered serious spinal and skull injuries while skiing; Chin also almost died in a severe avalanche on the same ski trip, four days after Ozturk’s accident. They overcame a broken portaledge and a "mini stroke" suffered by Ozturk, but cited excellent weather as a major factor in their success, which was recognized by the Guinness World Records as the first ascent of the Shark’s Fin. They reached the summit on their eighth day, and then it took them three days to descend.

In 2015, the feature film Meru was released, documenting Anker's team's two attempts on the route. It included footage taken by Chin and Ozturk on both attempts, originally intended just for posterity.

== Meru South Peak (West Face) ==
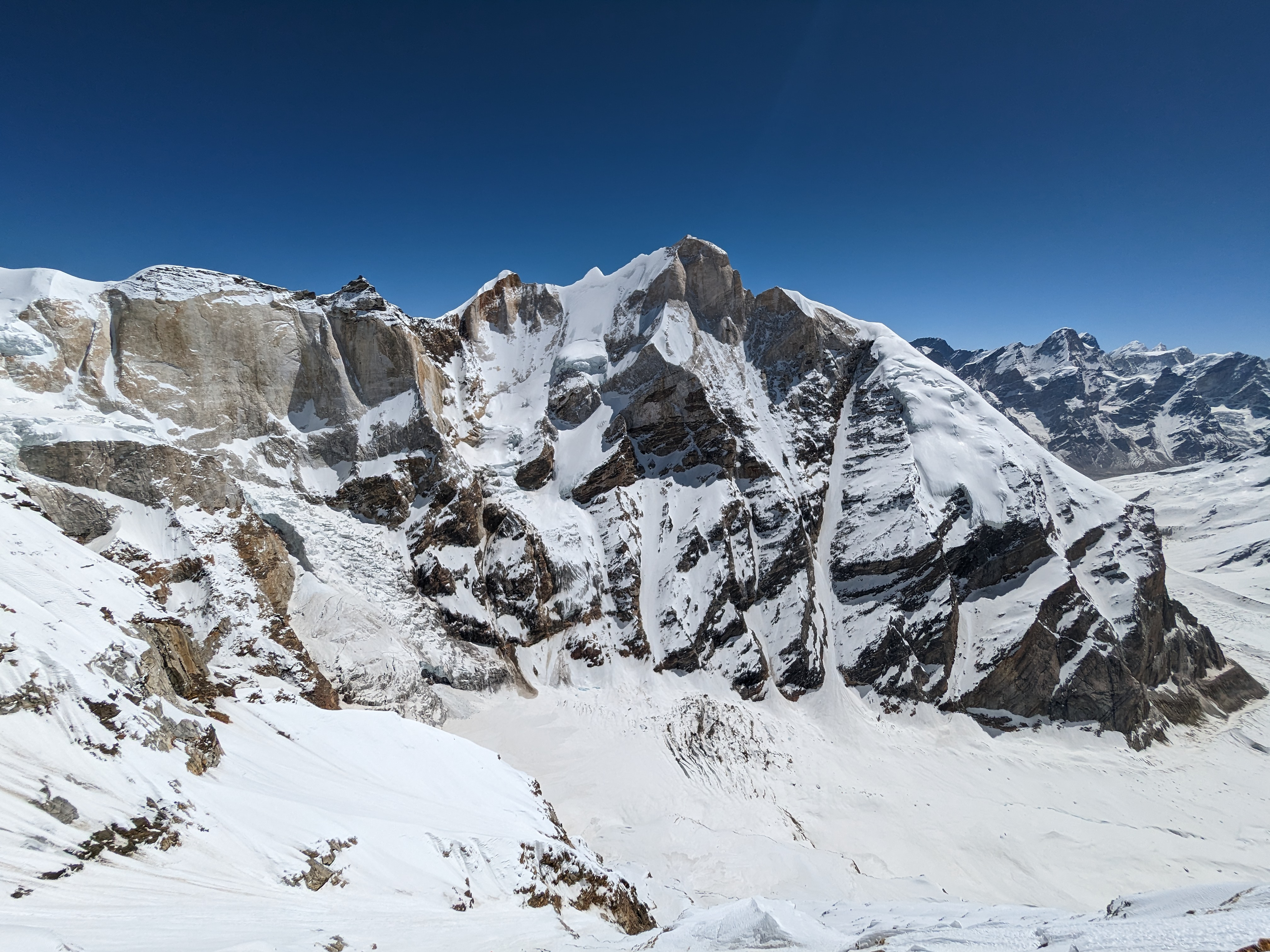
Meru Peak from the West Face (Photo by Giripremi)

Meru peak can be climbed from the East face and the West face. Giripremi Mountaineering Club from Pune, India attempted the Meru South peak (6660m) from the West face in 2023.

On 2 September 2023, the world's first successful climb to Meru South peak (6660m) from the West face was made by Indian team of Mingma Sherpa, Vinod Gusain, Ganesh More, Vivek Shivade, Varun Bhagwat, Bihari Singh Rana, Ajit Singh Rawat, Furtenzing Sherpa, and Dawa Sherpa from Giripremi Moutaineering club, Pune, India. The expedition was led by Umesh Zirpe. In 2024, the documentary film The Ascent of Mt. Meru, based on the same expedition, was screened at the Rio Mountain Festival, Brazil, and the Torello Mountain Film Festival, Spain.
