= Gomukh =

Source of the Bhagirathi River

- Gaumukh or Gomukhi
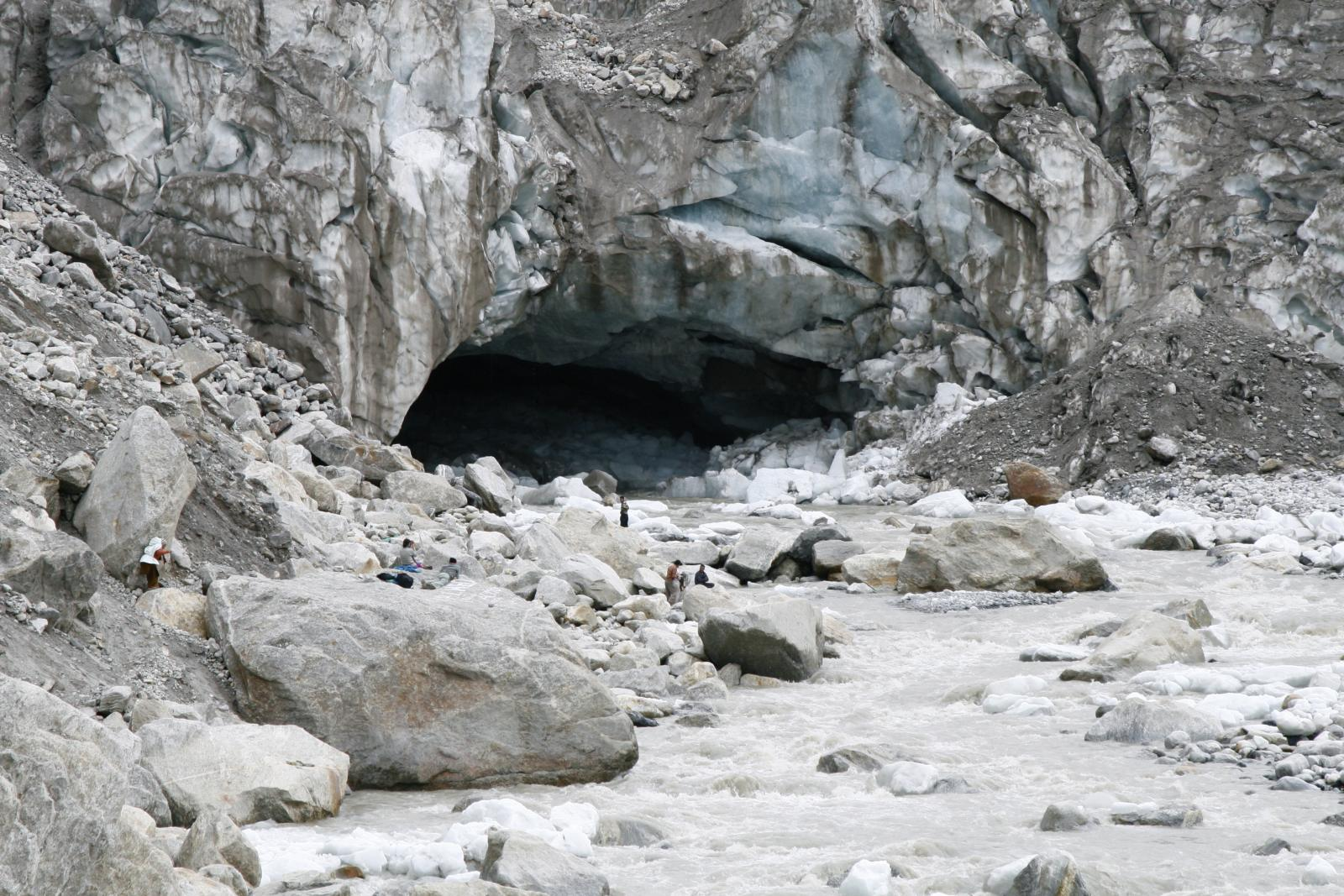
- Gomukh, "Face of a Cow", the pout of the glacier along the river

- Location within Uttarakhand Location within India
- Interactive map of Gomukh
- Location: Uttarkashi district, Uttarakhand, India
- Coordinates: 30°55′36″N 79°04′51″E
- Status: Retreating

Gomukh, also known as "Gaumukh" or "Gomukhi" (Hindi: गौमुख or गौमुखी ; Assamese and Bengali: গোমুখ or গোমুখী), is the terminus or snout of the Gangotri Glacier and the source of the Bhagirathi River, one of the primary headstreams of the Ganga River. The word Gomukh/Gaumukh (go/gau=cow, mukh= mouth) literally means "Mouth of a Cow."

The place is situated at a height of 13,200 ft (4,023 m) in the Uttarkashi district in the state of Uttarakhand, India. Gomukh is the snout of the Gangotri glacier, one of the largest glaciers in the Himalayas with an estimated volume of over 27 cubic kilometers.

It is a Hindu holy pilgrimage site, visited by many who visit Gangotri. It is around 18 km away from Gangotri and can be reached by trekking.

== Etymology and Religious Significance ==
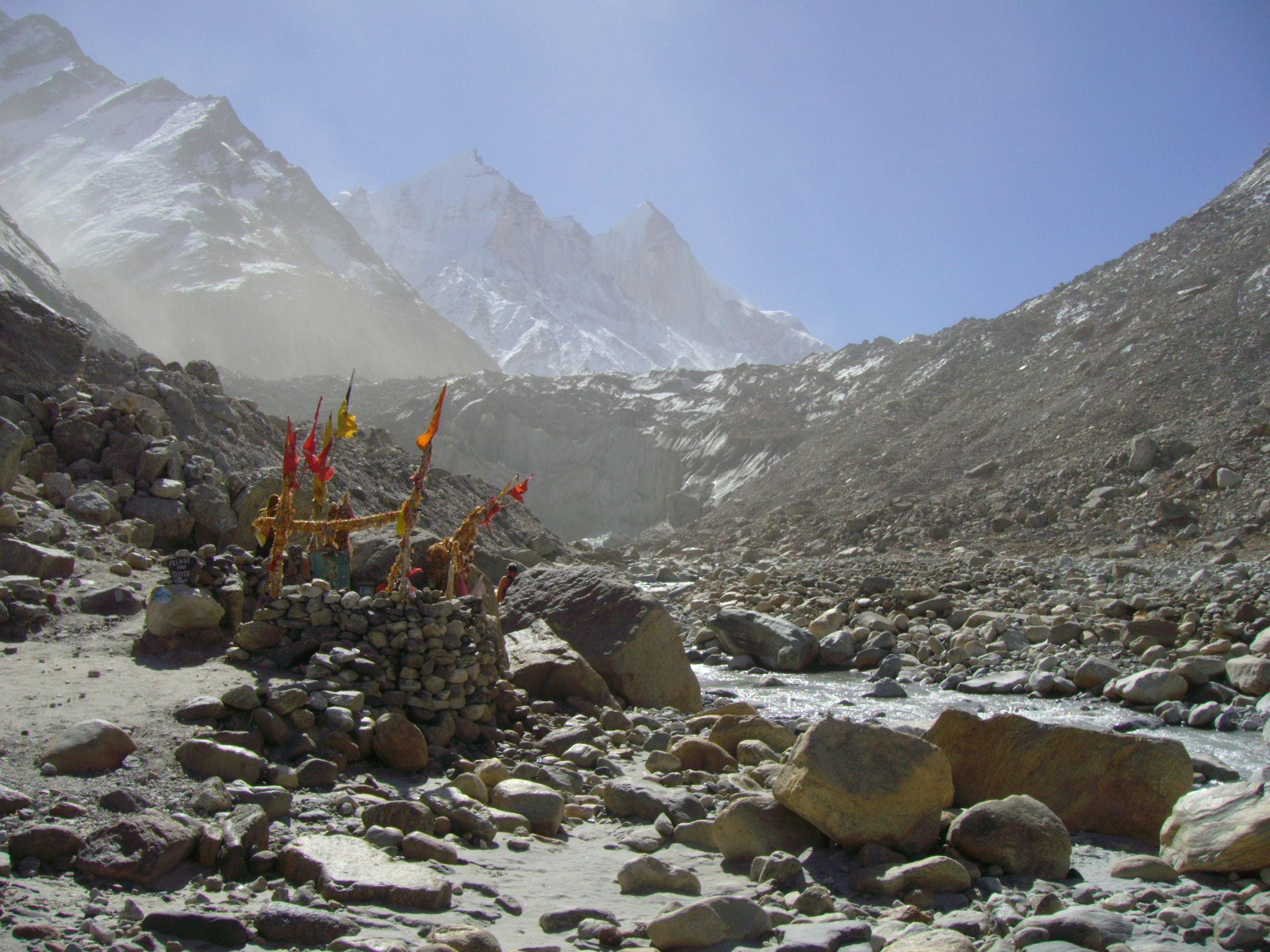
A small shrine at Gaumukh, Gangotri glacier.

Gomukh literally means “Cow’s Mouth” (go/gau = cow, mukh = mouth), named because of the shape of the ice cave. This idea stems from ancient Vedic texts like the Rig Veda, where mountain streams breaking free from melting ice were poetically compared to mother cows running out of a pen to nourish their calves with milk.

In Hindu tradition and literature, Gomukh is described as the location for the Avatarana (Divine Descent) of the Ganges on earth. According to Vedic literature e.g. the Ramayana and Puranas, the river originally flowed through the heavens as a celestial waterway. King Bhagiratha performed intense austerities (tapas) in the Himalayas to bring the river to earth so that she could redeem the ashes of the incinerated sons of King Sagara. To prevent the force of the fall from shattering earth, Lord Shiva caught the river in his matted locks (Jata), dampening her force before letting her flow out from the glacier snout - Gomukh.

== History ==
The first recorded European visit to Gomukh was made by John Hodgson and James Herbert on 31 May, 1817. Visits to Gomukh occurred long before the 19th century, as it lies on the ancient route of the Chota Char Dham Yatra, connecting Gangotri to Kedarnath. This pilgrimage route has been used by travelers and devotees for millennia.

In 1937, J B Auden published the first scientific map of the Gangotri Glacier and its snout, Gomukh.

== Geography ==
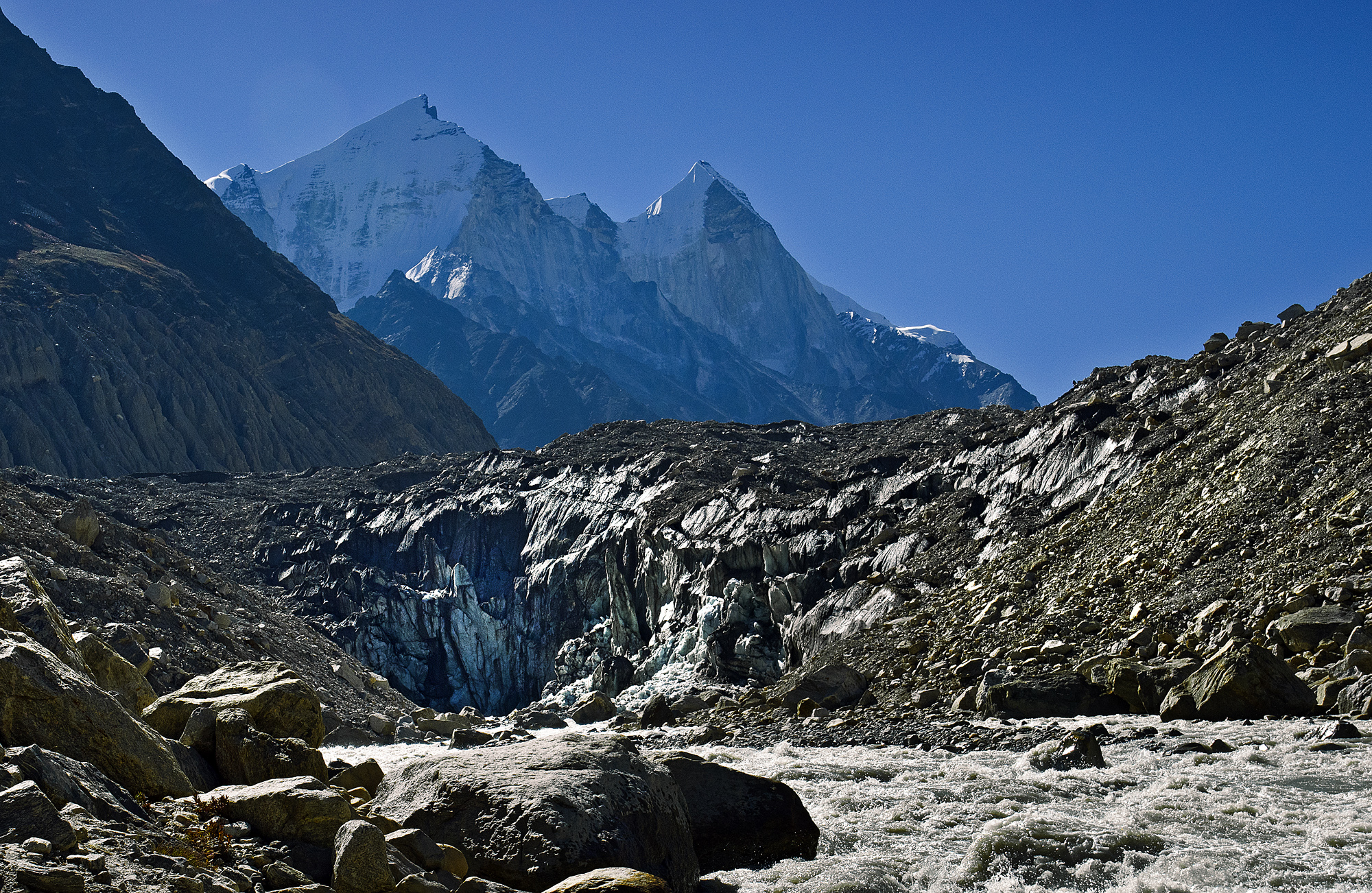
Gomukh, terminus of the Gangotri glacier. The Bhagirathi peaks rise in the background.

Gomukh is 18 km from Gangotri in the foothills of Bhagirathi at a height of 4,023 m. It is the snout of the Gangotri Glacier, a glacier system that reaches up to over 7,000 m above sea level.

Around the snout, the terrain consists of boulders, fragments of snow and compacted glacial snow. Meltwater coming out of this snout accounts for around 97% of the annual river discharge downstream near Bhojbasa.

The Gomukh snout is rapidly retreating. It has retreated about 1.5 km since the 1950s. Retreat rates averaged 10 to 20 meters per year around 1950s. However, recent surveys indicate that the snout is now retreating at a quicker rate of over 30 meters per year.

== Trek route ==
The trail to Gomukh begins at Gangotri, about 18 km (11.2 mi) from Gomukh. The route follows the Bhagirathi valley. It passes through Chirbasa - named for its blue pine (Pinus wallichiana) forests - and Gila Pahar, a stretch prone to landslides that sustained severe damage during the 2013 North India floods. The route continues through Bhojbasa, which is 14 km (8.7 mi) from Gangotri, before completing the final 4.5 km (2.8 mi) traverse across glacial moraine to the snout, set against the backdrop of Mount Shivling and the Bhagirathi Peaks.

The trek to Tapovan and Nandanvan starts from here.

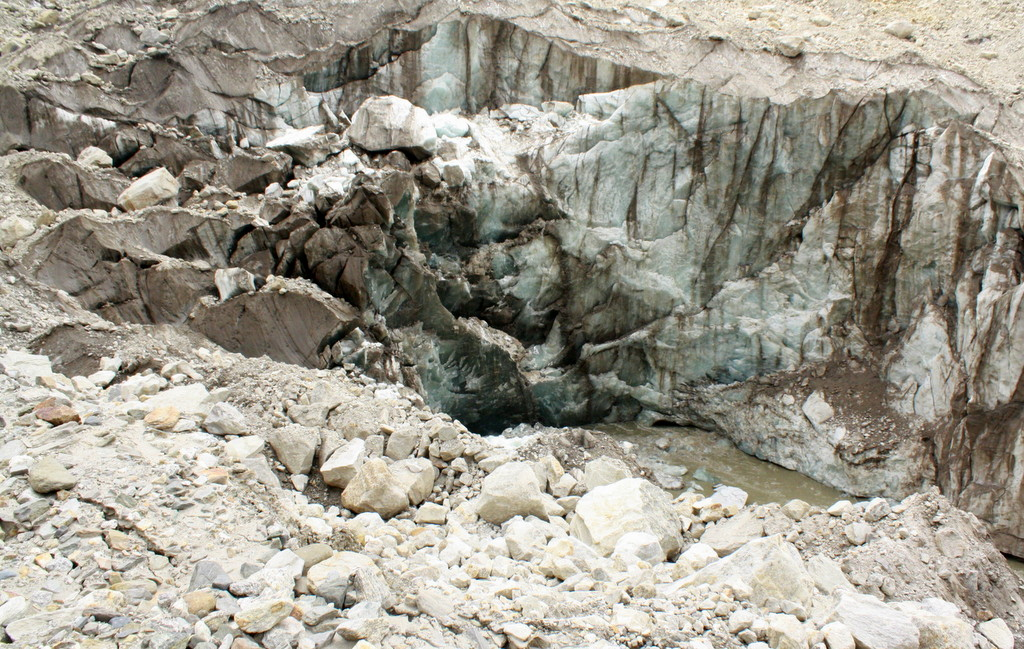
Snout point of Gangotri Glacier, Gomukh

The trek from Gomukh to Tapovan is partially marked and includes areas affected by rockfalls and landslides as well as uneven glacial terrain. The last 2 km climb to reach Tapovan is very steep with an elevation of around 1,500 ft (460 m).
