= Bhagirathi River =

River in Uttarakhand, India

Bhāgīrathī River
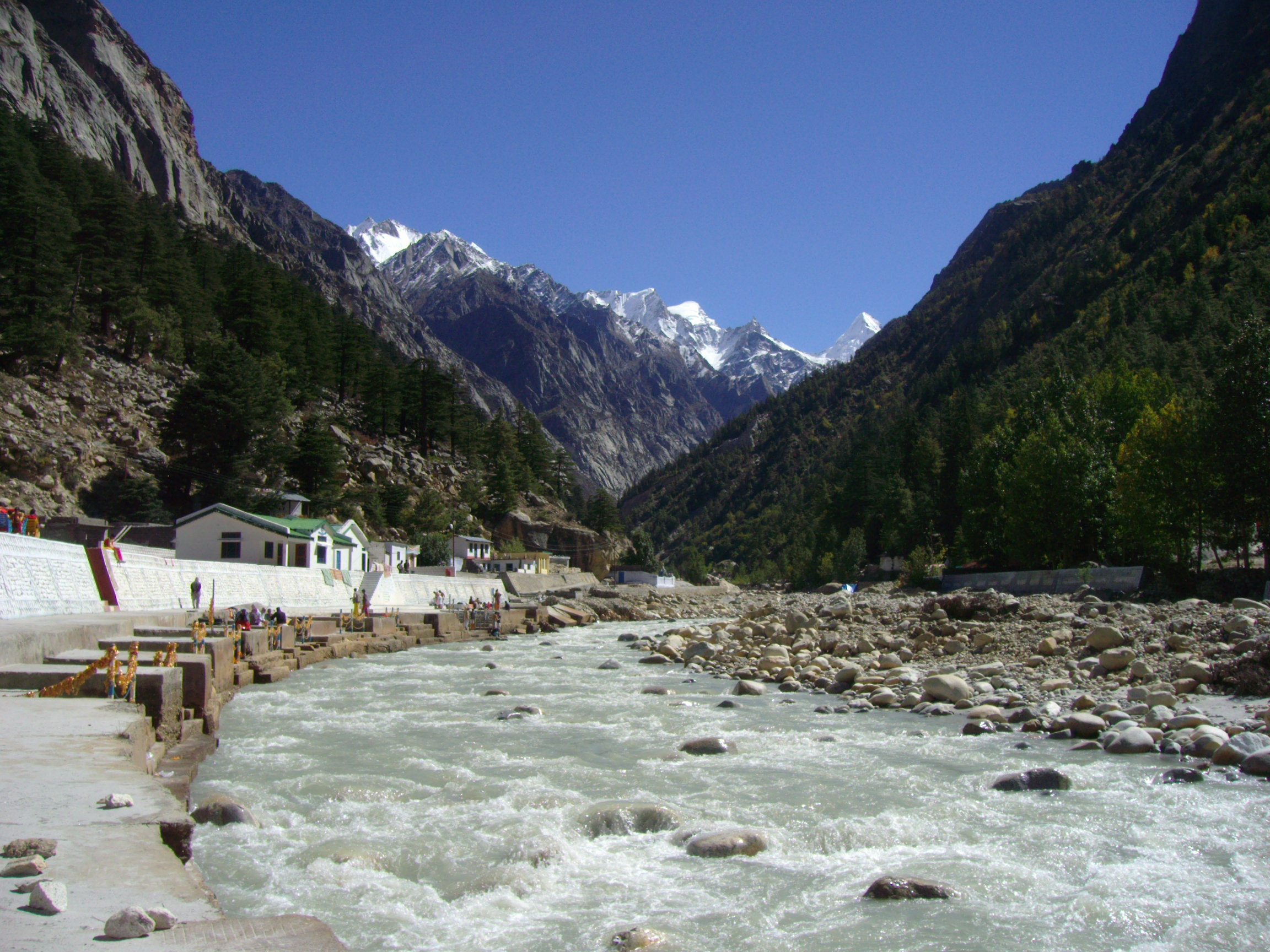
- Sacred bathing ghats on Bhagirathi River at Gangotri

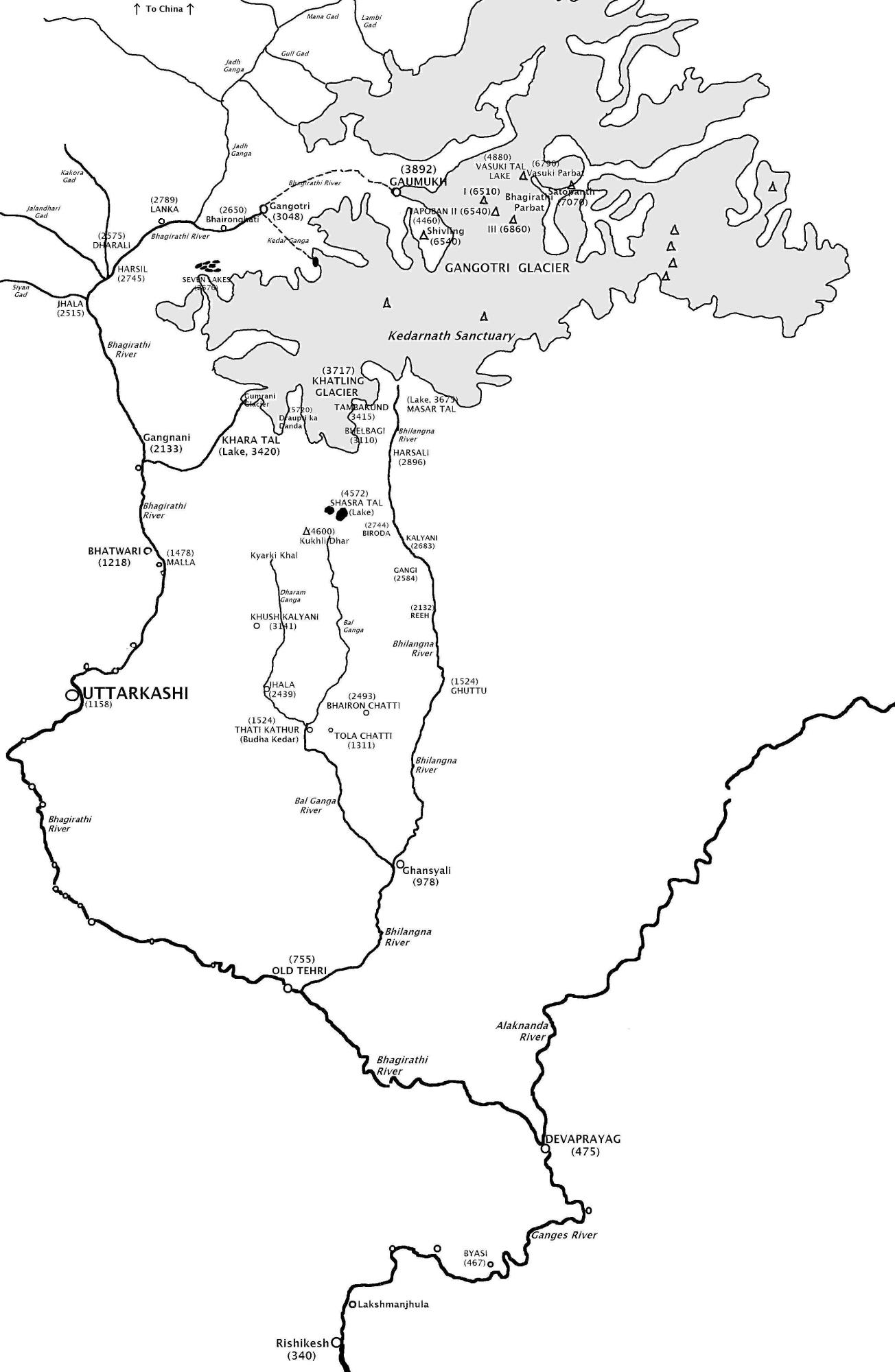
- Map showing the Himalayan headwaters of the Bhagirathi river. The numbers in parentheses refer to the altitude in meters.
- Etymology: "Bhagirathi" (Sanskrit, literally, "caused by Bhagiratha")
- Native name: भागीरथी (Sanskrit)

Location
- Country: India
- State: Uttarakhand,
- Region: Garhwal division
- District: Uttar Kashi District, Tehri District

Physical characteristics
- Source: Gaumukh (gau, cow + mukha, mouth), about 18 km (11.2 mi) from the town of Gangotri
  - coordinates: 30.925449°N 79.081480°E
  - elevation: 3,892 m (12,769 ft)
- Source confluence: Alaknanda River
- Mouth: Ganges
  - location: Devprayag, Uttarakhand, India
  - coordinates: 30.146315°N 78.598251°E
  - elevation: 475 m (1,558 ft)
- Length: 205 km (127 mi)
- Basin size: 6,921 km^{2} (2,672 sq mi)
- Discharge
  - average: 257.78 m^{3}/s (9,103 cu ft/s)
  - maximum: 3,800 m^{3}/s (130,000 cu ft/s)

The Bhāgīrathī (/ˈbɑː.ɡiː.rə.θiː/) is a turbulent Himalayan river in the Indian state of Uttarakhand, and one of the two headstreams of the Ganges, the major river of Northern India and the holy river of Hinduism. In the Hindu faith, history, and culture, the Bhagirathi is considered the source stream of the Ganges. However, in hydrology, the other headstream Alaknanda, is considered the source stream on account of its great length and discharge. The Bhagirathi and Alaknanda join at Devprayag in Garhwal and are thereafter known as the Ganges.

== Etymology ==
In Hindu texts, Bhagiratha was a descendant of King Sagara of the Suryavamsha, or Solar Dynasty. He played an important role in the descent of the Ganges. The story of Bhagiratha is narrated in the Ramayana, Mahabharata, and the Puranas.

Wanting to show his sovereignty, King Sagara performed a ritual known as ashvamedha, where a horse was left to wander for one year. However, Indra stole the horse to prevent the ritual from being successful. Learning that the horse had disappeared, King Sagara sent his sixty thousand sons to look for it. They eventually found the horse at the ashram of sage Kapila. Thinking that sage Kapila had stolen the horse, the sons interrupted him while he was in deep meditation. This infuriated sage Kapila and with his ascetic's gaze burned all sixty thousand sons to ashes. King Sagara sent his grandson, Amshuman, to ask sage Kapila what could be done to bring deliverance to their souls.

Sage Kapila advised that only the water of the Ganges, which flowed in the heavens, could liberate them. Bhagiratha, Amshuman's grandson, undertook ascetic practices and won the favour of Brahma and Shiva. Brahma allowed the goddess Ganga to descend upon the earth, while Shiva broke Ganga's fall in the coils of his hair so that her force would not shatter the earth.

When Ganga descended, Bhagiratha took her through the mountains, foothills, the plains of India, and to the sea where she liberated the sixty thousand sons of King Sagara. Due to Bhagiratha's role in the descent of the Ganges, the source stream came to be known as Bhagirathi.

== Course ==
The Bhagirathi River is mythologically known to be the source stream for the Ganges River. In hydrology, the Alaknanda is the source stream for the Ganges River due to its length and discharge. The Alaknanda River, including its tributaries, is 664.5 km (412.9 miles) and the Bhagirathi River, including its tributaries, is 456.5 km (283.7 miles).

The headwaters of the Bhagirathi River are formed at Gaumukh at the foot of the Gangotri glacier. From Gaumukh the river reaches the town of Gangotri. Kedar Ganga River joins Bhagirathi River at Gangotri.

From Gangotri, Bhagirathi River travels down a deep gorge and arrives at Bhaironghati. Jadh Ganga River joins Bhagirathi River at Bhaironghati.

The river continues to travel to Harsil and crosses the Bhagirathi Granite. Kakora Gad River and Jalandhari Gad River join Bhagirathi River near Harsil. It then enters a wide valley and meets two tributaries (Siyan Gad and another small River) near Jhala.

The Bhagirathi river continues to flow downwards to Uttarkashi, where River Asi Ganga joins, and then through Dharasu, Chinyalisaur, and the old town of Tehri. The old town of Tehri sat at the confluence of the Bhagirathi and Bhilangna rivers. It was formerly known as Ganesh Prayag. Construction of the Tehri Dam totally submerged the old town of Tehri, and the population was shifted to the town of New Tehri.

From Tehri, the Bhagirathi river reaches Devprayag via the Himalayas. At Devprayag, the Bhagirathi River converges with the Alaknanda River and travels onward as the Ganges River.

=== Tributaries ===
The Bhagirathi River is joined by several tributaries; these are, in order from the source:

- Kedar Ganga at Gangotri (elevation 3,049 m (10,003 ft)),
- Jadh Ganga at Bhaironghati (elevation 2,650 m (8,690 ft)),
- Kakora Gad and Jalandhari Gad near Harsil (elevation 2,745 m (9,006 ft)),
- Siyan Gad near Jhala (elevation 2,575 m (8,448 ft)),
- Asi Ganga near Uttarkashi (elevation 1,158 m (3,799 ft)),
- Bhilangna River near Old Tehri (elevation 755 m (2,477 ft)).

The Bhilangna itself rises at the foot of the Khatling Glacier (elevation 3,717 m (12,195 ft)) approximately 50 km (31 mi) south of Gaumukh.

The controversial Tehri dam lies at the confluence of the Bhagirathi River and the Bhilangna, at 30°22′32″N 78°28′48″E, near Tehri. Chaukhamba I is the highest point of the Bhagirathi basin.

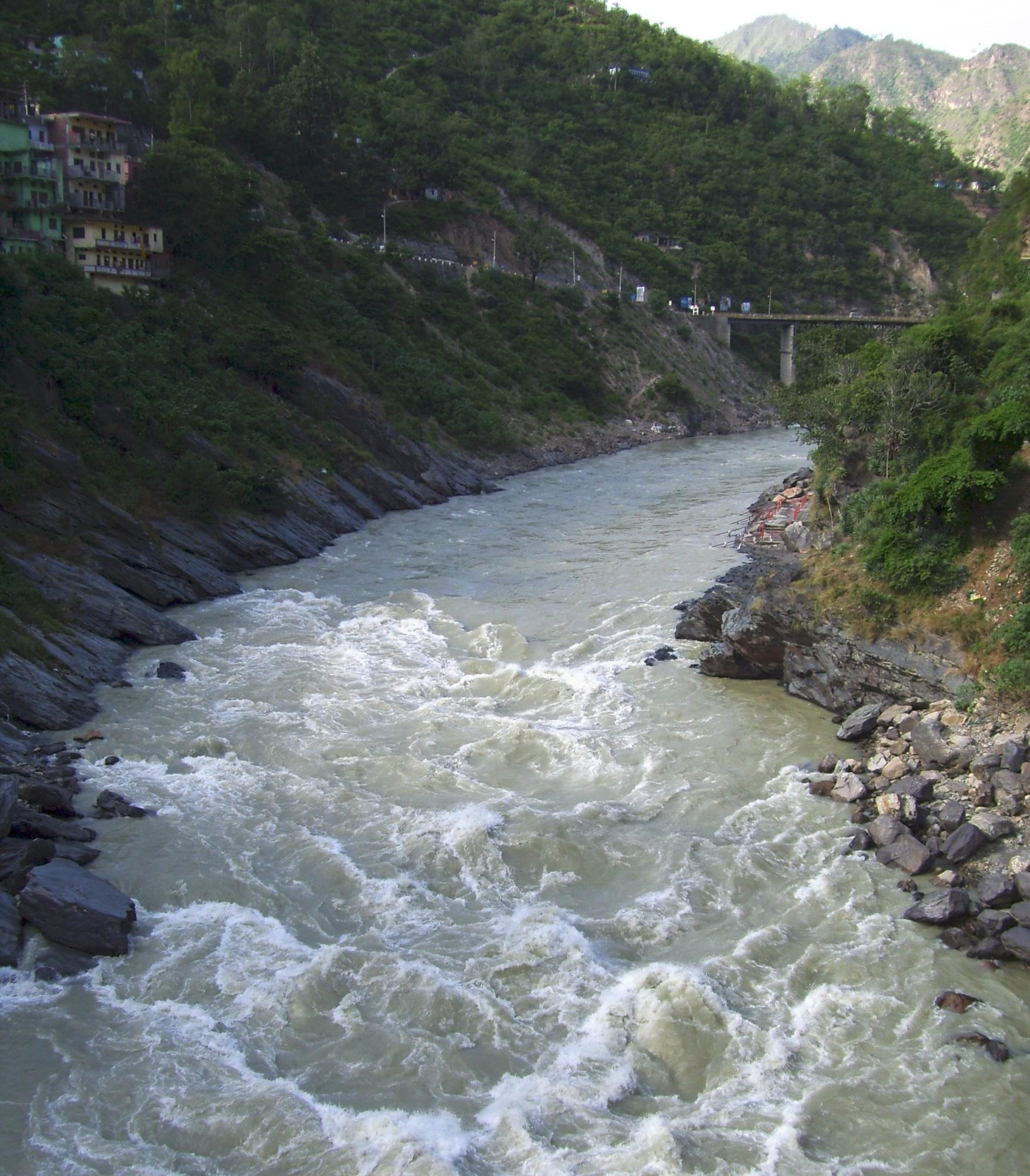
The turbulent Bhagirathi as it enters Devprayag.

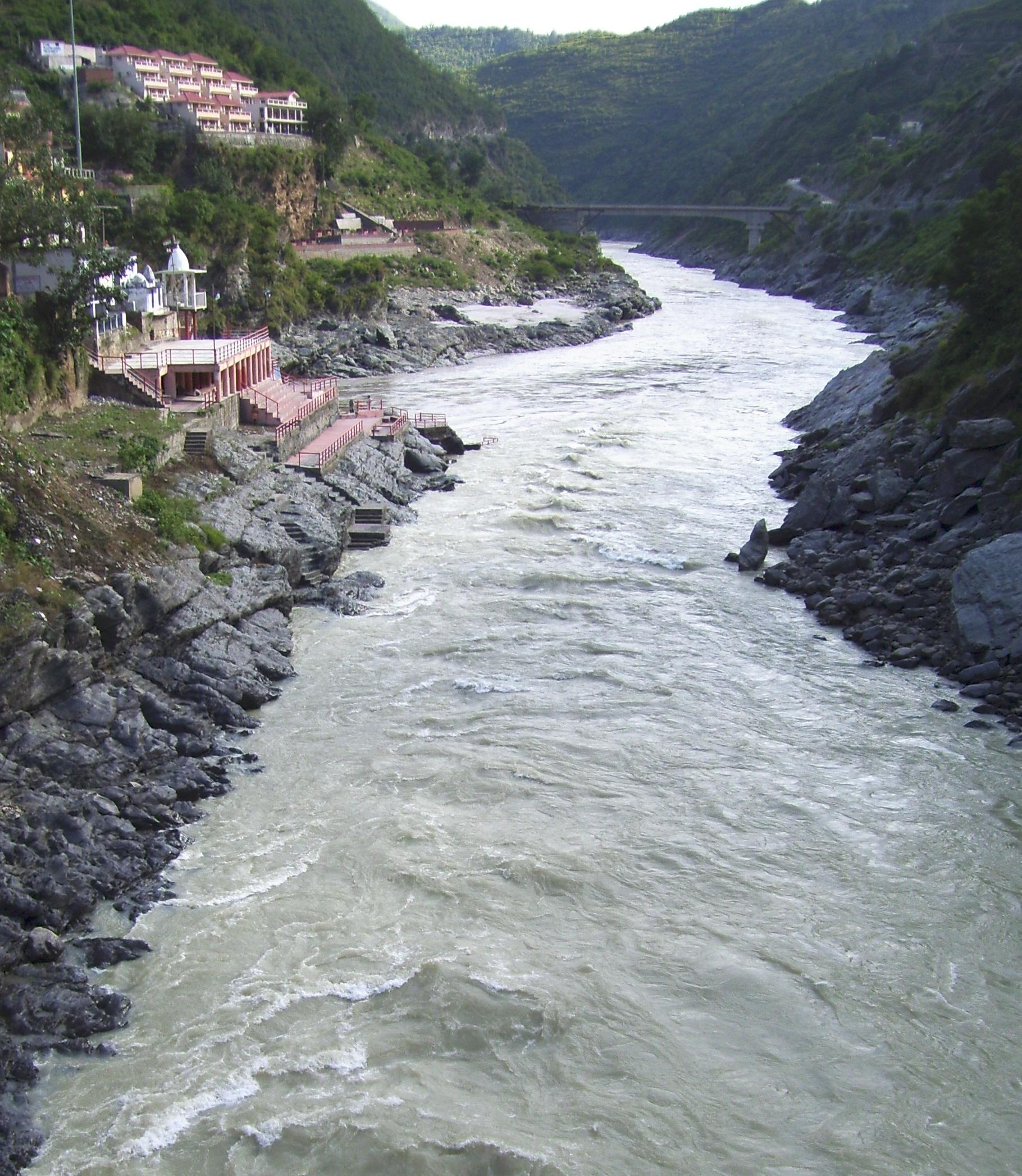
The Bhagirathi (foreground) on its way to meet the sediment-laden Alaknanda, and to flow on as the Ganges.

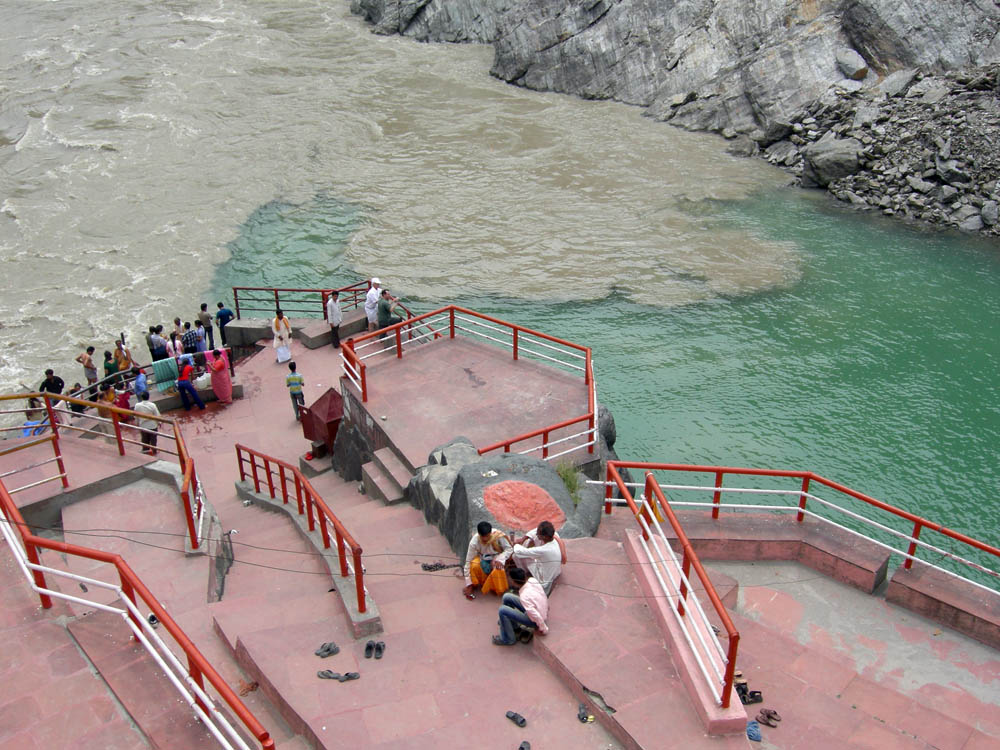
Another view of the confluence at Devprayag.

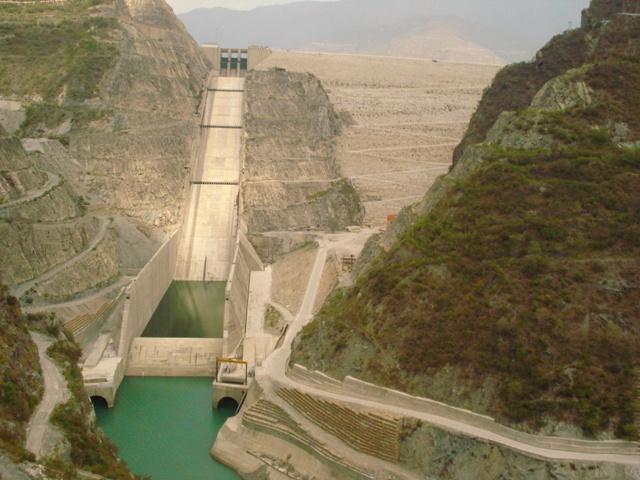
Tehri Dam, the 5th tallest dam in the world

== Dams ==
There are 18 dams along the Bhagirathi River, either in operation, under construction or planned. These are, in order from the source:

Hydroelectric Dams on the Bhagirathi River Abbreviations: MW: electrical output capacity (Megawatts), Ht: dam height (M) FRL: full reservoir level (MSL), MWL: maximum water level (MSL), HRT: head race tunnel length (KM), TRT: tail race tunnel length (KM), TWL: tail water level (MSL), RBL: river bed level at dam site (MSL)
#	Name	Ht	MW	Status	FRL	MWL	HRT	TRT	TWL	RBL	Coordinates
1	Karmoli Dam		140	planned			8.6				
2	Gangotri Dam		55	planned			5.2				
3	Jadhganga Dam		50	planned			1.1				
4	Bhaironghati I Dam		380	planned							
5	Bhaironghati II Dam		65	planned							
6	Harsil Dam		210	planned			5.06				
7	Loharinag Pala Hydro Power Project		600	cancelled	2,147	1,667	13.85	.51	1.665		30°58′6″N 78°41′56″E
8	Pala Maneri I Dam	78	480	cancelled	1,665	1,667	12.563	1.378			
9	Maneri Dam	38	90	operation				8.631			
10	Joshiyara (Bhali) Dam		304	operation			16.0				
11	Bhilangana II Dam		11	planned							
12	Bhilangana I Dam		22.5	planned			2.0				
13	Tehri Dam	260.5	2,400	operation	830	835	1.634	.8625			30°22′40″N 78°28′50″E
14	Koteshwar Dam	97.5	400	operation	612.50	615					
15	Kotli Bel 1A Dam	82.5	195	construction							
16	Kotli Bel 1B Dam	90	320	cancelled							
17	Kotli Bel II Dam	82	530	cancelled							
