= Bugyals =

High altitude meadows in India

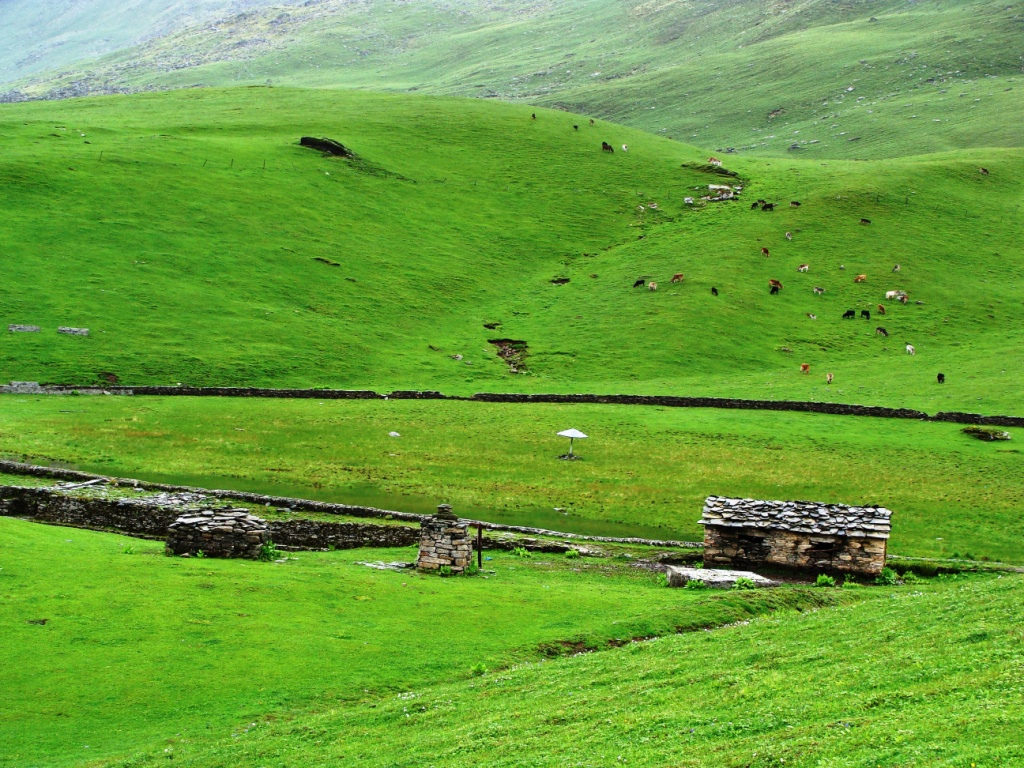
View of Bedni Bugyal on the way to Roopkund

Bugyal are alpine pasture lands, or meadows in India, in higher elevation range between 3,300 metres (10,800 ft) and 4,000 metres (13,000 ft) of the Himalayas in the Indian state of Uttarakhand, where they are called "nature’s own gardens". "Bugyal" (बुग्याल) is primarily a localised regional word from the Himalayan state of Uttarakhand. It originates from the Garhwali and Kumaoni languages. The topography of the terrain is either flat or sloped. The surface of these bugyals is covered with natural green grass and seasonal flowers. They are used by tribal herdsmen to graze their cattle. During the winter season, the alpine meadows remain snow-covered. During summer months, the Bugyals present a riot of beautiful flowers and grass. As bugyals constitute very fragile ecosystems, particular attention needs to be given for their conservation.

Some of the notable bugyals are: Auli near Joshimath, Garsi, Kwanri, Gulabi Kantha, Bedni, Panwali Kantha and Kush Kalyan, Dayara, Gidara, Bagji Bugyal and Munsiyari.

== List of Bugyals ==
| Place | District | Image |
|---|---|---|
| Ali Bugyal | Chamoli | Ali Bugyal |
| Auli Bugyal | Chamoli | Auli Bugyal |
| Bagji Bugyal | Chamoli | Bagji Bugyal |
| Bedni Bugyal | Chamoli | Bedni Bugyal |
| Chainsheel Bugyal | Uttarkashi | Chainsheel Bugyal |
| Chopta Bugyal | Rudraprayag | Chopta Bugyal |
| Dayara Bugyal | Uttarkashi | Dayara Bugyal |
| Gidara Bugyal | Uttarkashi | Gidara Bugyal |
| Gorson Bugyal | Chamoli | Gorson Bugyal |
| Gulabi Kantha Bugyal | Uttarkashi | Gulabikantha Bugyal |
| Har Ki Doon Bugyal | Uttarkashi | Har Ki Doon Bugyal |
| Helsi Bugyal | Tehri Garhwal | Helsi Bugyal |
| Kedar Kantha Bugyal | Uttarkashi | Kedarkantha Bugyal |
| Khaliya Bugyal | Pithoragarh | Khaliya Bugyal |
| Kush Kalyan Bugyal | Tehri Garhwal | Kush Kalyan Bugyal |
| Madhyamaheshwar Bugyal | Chamoli | Madhyamaheshwar Bugyal |
| Moila Bugyal | Dehradun | Moila Bugyal |
| Moth Bugyal | Rudraprayag | Moth Bugyal |
| Nag Tibba Bugyal | Tehri Garhwal | Nag Tibba Bugyal |
| Panar Bugyal | Chamoli | Panar Bugyal |
| Panwali Kantha Bugyal | Tehri Garhwal | Panwali Kantha Bugyal |
| Pushtara Bugyal | Uttarkashi | Pushtara Bugyal |
| Nawali Bugyal | Chamoli | Nawali Bugyal |

== Conservation issues ==
Bugyal is a fragile ecosystem and it is essential to maintain a balance between ecology and environment. In this context a court case was filed by the public objecting to erection of the prefab houses and by introducing non-biodegradable matter in the upper meadows of the bugyals by the tourism departments. It was averred that the peace and tranquility of the bugyals was getting affected. The court had ordered that the polluter must pay for the damage to environment based on absolute liability principle, which covered payment of damages to the affected people but also to compensate for all costs for restoration of the degraded environments.

== See also ==
- Meadow
- Grassland
- Shola

== Bibliography ==
- Pandey, Abhimanyu, Nawraj Pradhan, Swapnil Chaudhari, and Rucha Ghate. "Withering of traditional institutions? An institutional analysis of the decline of migratory pastoralism in the rangelands of the Kailash Sacred Landscape, western Himalayas." Environmental Sociology 3, no. 1 (2017): 87–100.
- Alter, Stephen (10 March 2015). Becoming a Mountain: Himalayan Journeys in Search of the Sacred and the Sublime. Skyhorse Publishing Company, Incorporated. ISBN 978-1-62872-542-1.
- Bahuguna, Sunderlal (1997). Fire in the Heart, Firewood on the Back. Parvatiya Navjeevan Mandal.
- Bhatt, Saligram (2004). Environment Protection and Sustainable Development. APH Publishing. ISBN 978-81-7648-512-8.
- Bisht, P. S. (1 January 2008). Tourist Resources and Development in Himalayas. Anamika Publishers & Distributors. ISBN 978-81-7975-231-9.
- Goyal, Ashutosh (1 May 2014). RBS Visitors Guide INDIA – Uttarakhand: Uttarakhand Travel Guide. Data and Expo India Pvt. Ltd. ISBN 978-93-80844-79-4.
- Betts, Vanessa; McCulloch, Victoria (10 February 2014). Indian Himalaya Footprint Handbook: Includes Corbett National Park, Darjeeling, Leh, Sikkim. Footprint Travel Guides. ISBN 978-1-907263-88-0.
- Kohli, M.S. (1983). The Himalayas: Playground of the Gods – Trekking, Climbing and Adventures. Indus Publishing. ISBN 978-81-7387-107-8.
- Nigam, Devesh (2002). Tourism, Environment, and Development of Garhwal Himalaya. Mittal Publications. ISBN 978-81-7099-870-9.
- Pandey, Dinesh Chandra; Pandey, Puran C. (1 January 2003). Environmental Resources and Tourism Development in the Himalaya. Anamika Publishers & Distributors. ISBN 978-81-7975-054-4.
- Prasad, Mahesh (2009). No, Minister: Memoirs of a Civil Servant. Macmillan India. ISBN 978-0-230-63647-7.
- Rai, Himanshu; Upreti, Dalip K. (11 December 2013). Terricolous Lichens in India: Volume 2: Morphotaxonomic Studies. Springer Science & Business Media. ISBN 978-1-4939-0360-3.
- Rawat, G. S. (2005). Alpine Meadows of Uttaranchal: Ecology, Landuse, and Status of Medicinal & Aromatic Plants. Bishen Singh Mahendra Pal Singh. ISBN 978-81-211-0464-7.
- Singhal, Yogy (18 November 2013). The Human Trinity. Partridge Publishing. ISBN 978-1-4828-1387-6.
- Sharma, Dr. Shiv (2008). India – A Travel Guide. Diamond Pocket Books (P) Ltd. ISBN 978-81-284-0067-4.
- Singh, Tapeshwar (2004). Resource Conservation and Food Security: An Indian Experience. Concept Publishing Company. ISBN 978-81-8069-101-0.
- Thapliyal, Uma Prasad (2005). Uttaranchal: Historical and Cusltural Perspectives. B.R. Publishing Corporation. ISBN 978-81-7646-463-5.
- Tmh. General Knowledge Digest 2010. Tata McGraw-Hill Education. ISBN 978-0-07-069939-7.
- Weare, Garry (2009). Trekking in the Indian Himalaya. Lonely Planet. ISBN 978-1-74059-768-5.
- Yadav, Hridai Ram (1 January 1989). Dimensions of Wastelands Development: Proceedings of the National Seminar on Wastelands Development, New Delhi, 1986. Concept Publishing Company. ISBN 978-81-7022-264-4.
