= Gidara Bugyal =

Bugyal (Himalayan Alpine Meadows) in the Uttarkashi district of Uttarakhand

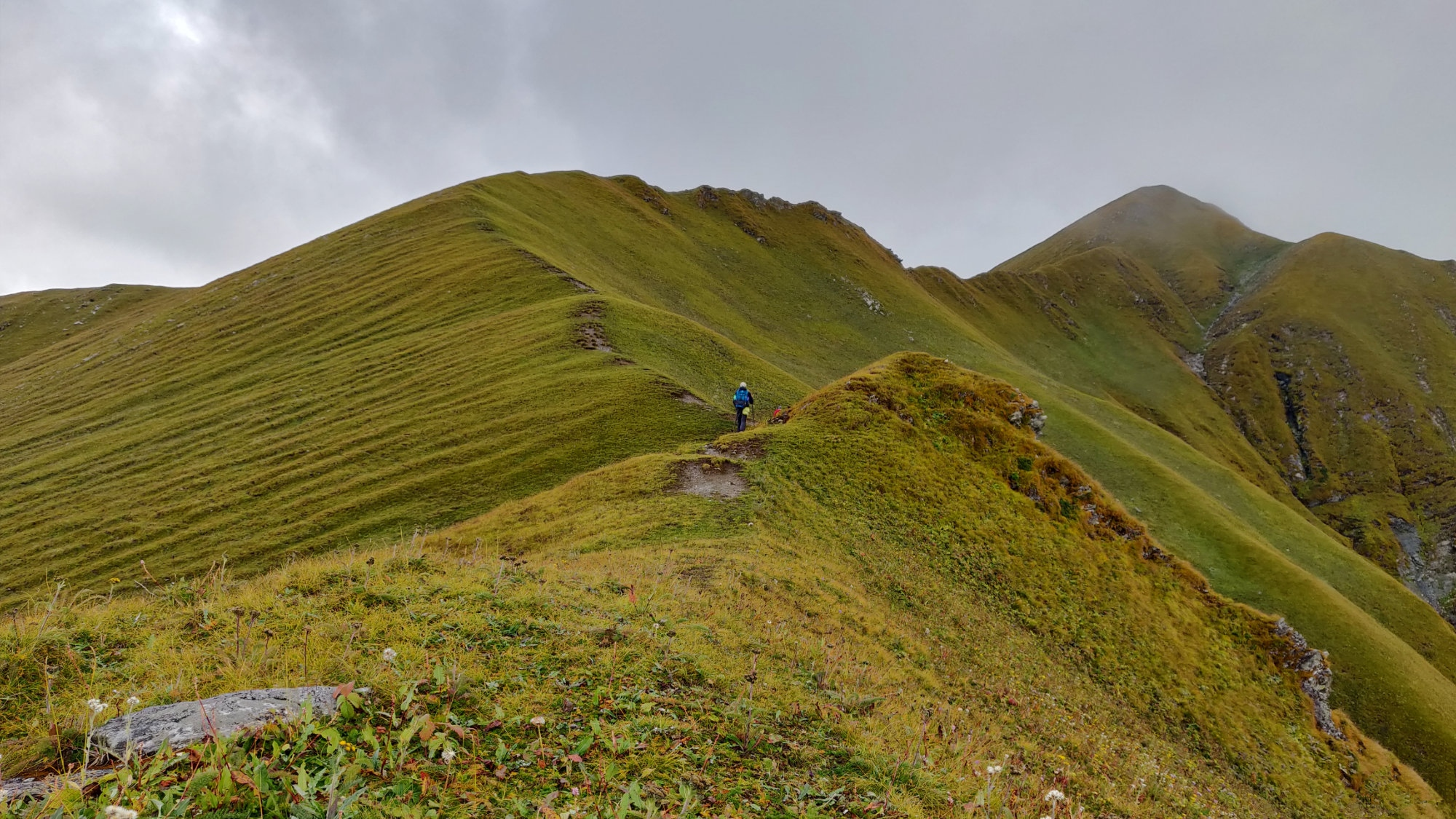
- Gidara Bugyal

Highest point
- Elevation: 4,309 m (14,137 ft)
- Coordinates: 30.9400276°N 78.6021087°E

Geography
- Location: Uttarkashi district, Uttarakhand, India
- Parent range: Garhwal Himalaya

Gidara Bugyal is a Bugyal (Himalayan Alpine Meadows) in the Uttarkashi district of Uttarakhand. Gidara Bugyal is a trekking and camping destination. The Bugyal has an average elevation of 4309m. The bugyal has a great expanse of lush green meadows and Himalayan peaks such as Bandarpunch, Gangotri can be seen clearly from here. The trek to this Bugyal is of around 20 km and starts from Gangnani, which is about 48 km from Uttarkashi.

The Bugyal can also reached from Dayara Bugyal and is 20 km ahead of Dayara Bugyal. Gidara Bugyal is a lesser known trek due to its altitude and difficulty. The best time to visit Gidara Bugyal is either in the month of June, when some patches of the land are covered with snow or in the month of September, when the snow has melted. The region remains unapproachable during the Winters due to the trek route which remains covered with snow. It is one of the highest and largest high altitude meadows and larger than the twin meadows of Ali and Bedni Bugyal as well. Bamsaru Tal, situated at an elevation of 4812m is also place to visit and is located 10 km ahead of Gidara Bugyal.

== Gallery ==
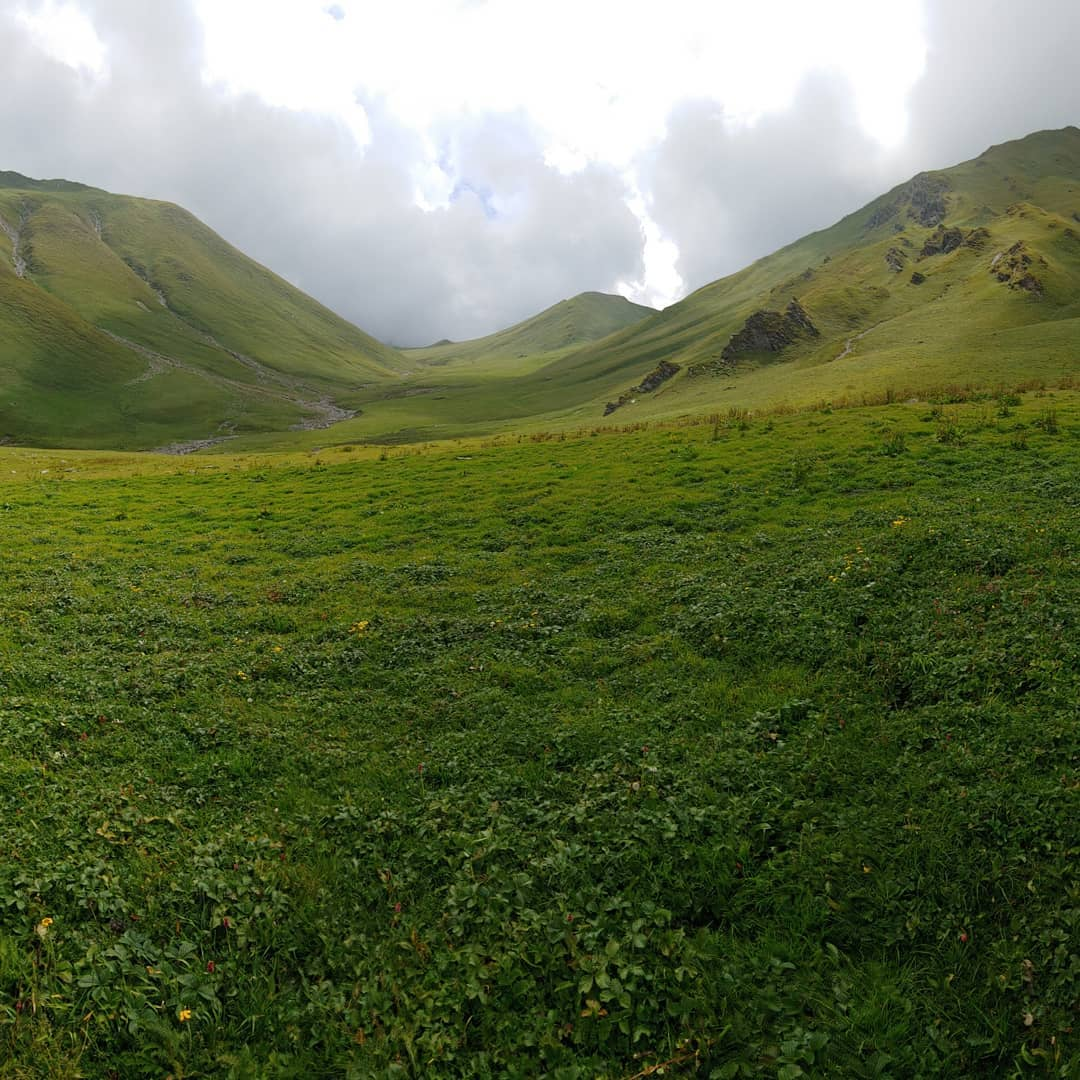
Gidara Bugyal

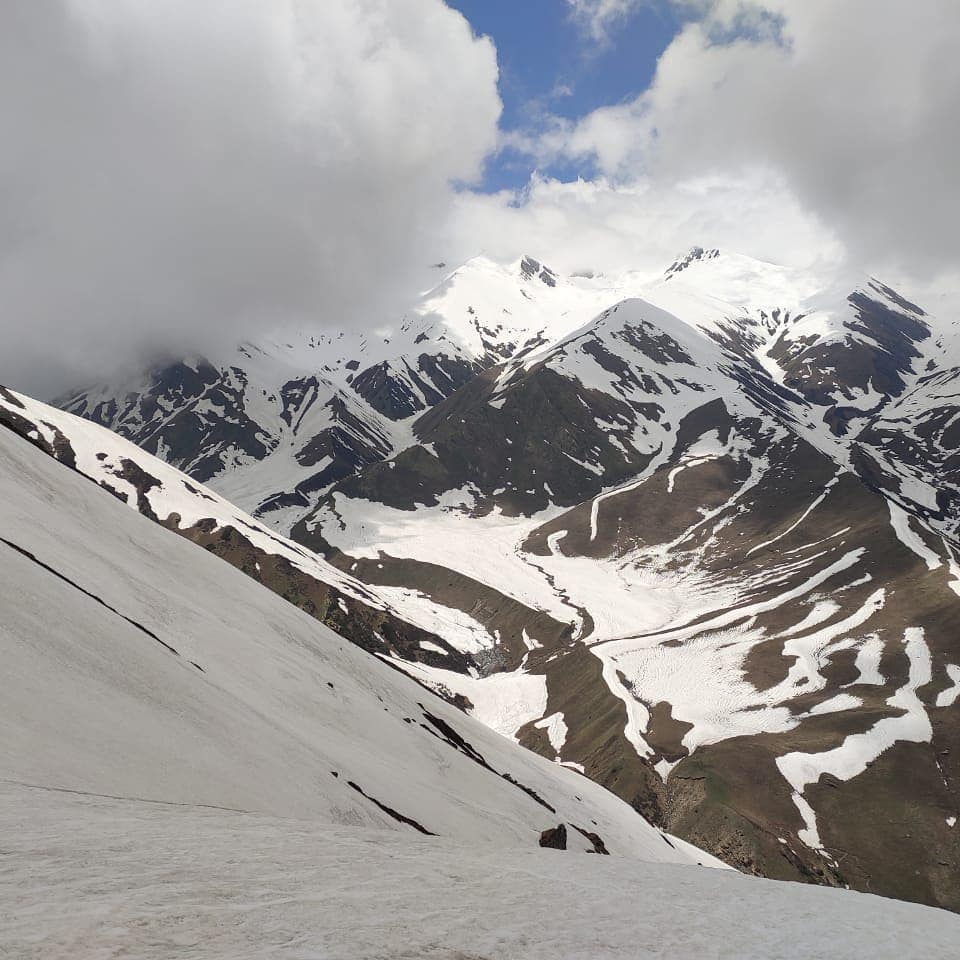
Gidara Bugyal covered with snow

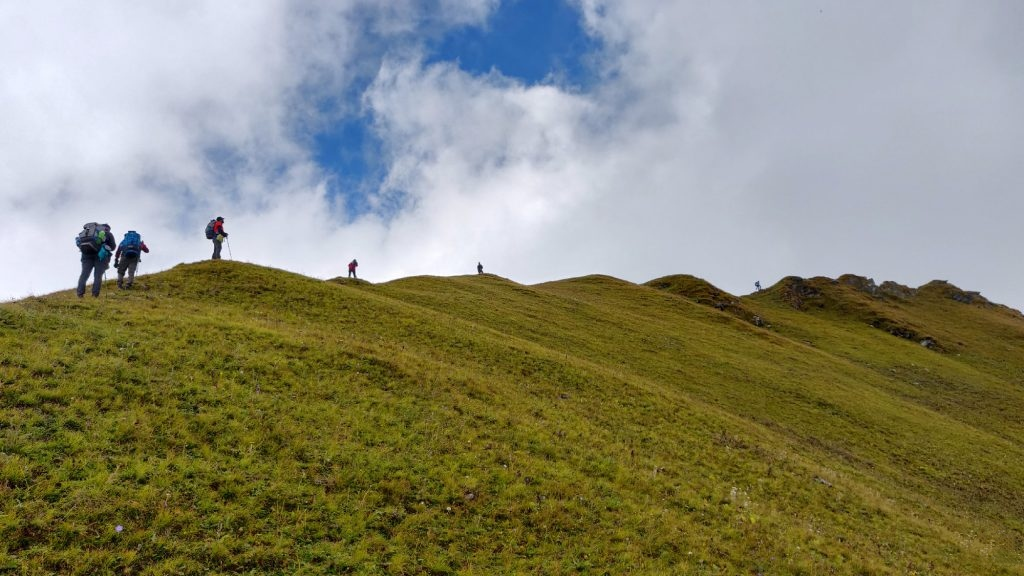
Ridge walking at Gidara Bugyal

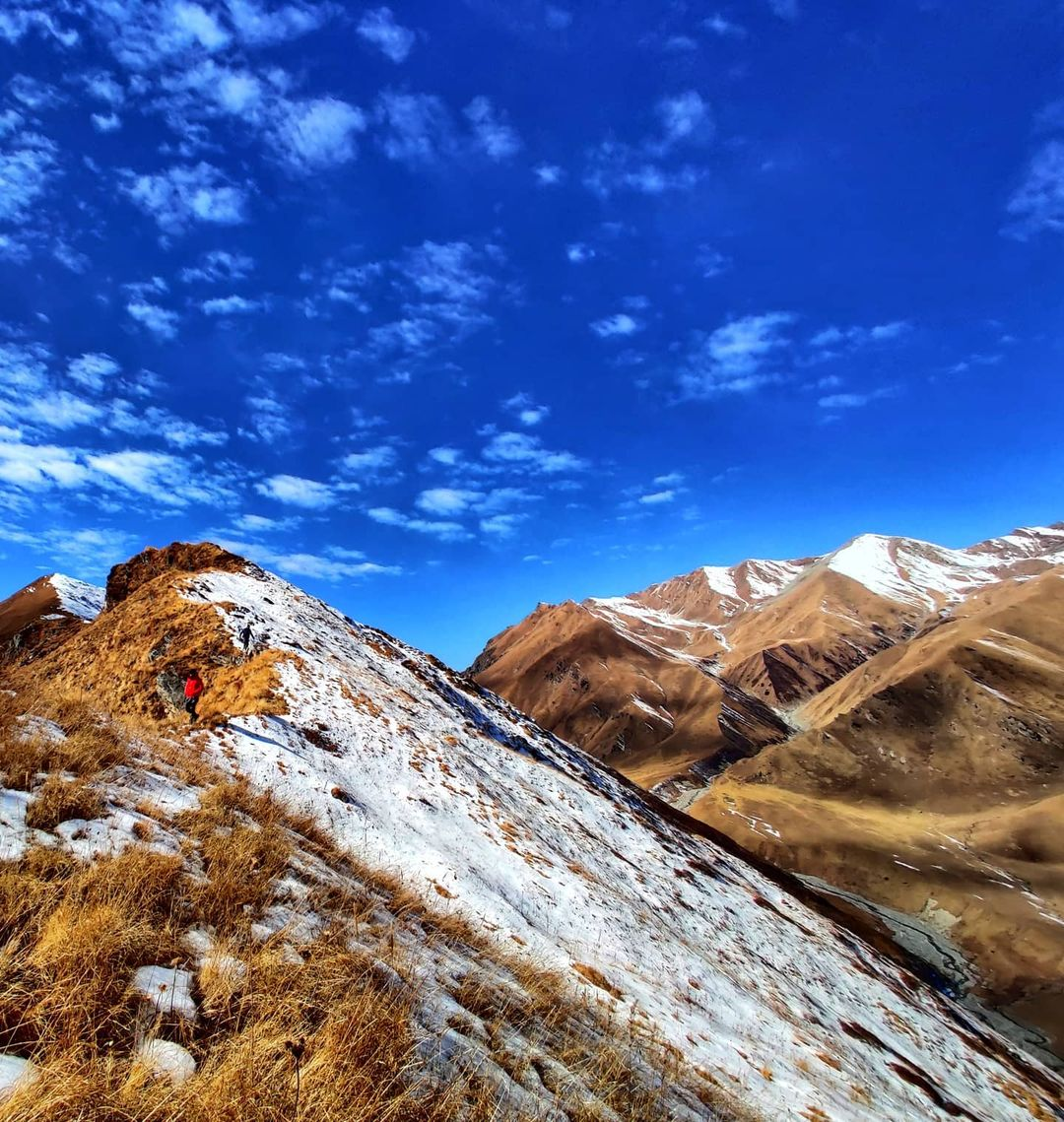
Gidara Bugyal
