= Sankri =

Village in Uttarakhand, India

Coordinates: 31.07844°N 78.183698°E

Sankri is a village situated at an altitude of 1950 m above sea level in Mori Tehsil, Uttarkashi district, Uttarakhand, India. Part of the Govind Balabh Pant Wildlife Sanctuary, Sankri is 25 km away from the sub-district headquarters Mori and 195 km from the district headquarters Uttarkashi. Barkot is the closest town to Sankri at approximately 86 km. The total geographical area of Sankri village is 40.01 hectares. According to 2009 statistics, Saur is the gram panchayat of Sankri, and according to 2011 census information, the location code or village code of Sankari village is 040230.

Sankri is also considered as the base camp of several treks like Har Ki Doon, Kedarkantha, Ruinsara Tal, Bali Pass, Borasu Pass, Dev Kyara Bugyal, Bharadsar Lake, Saru Tal, Nalgan Pass, Maldaru and is also the base village of various mountain peaks such as Swargarohini Ranges, Banderpunch, and Black Peak.

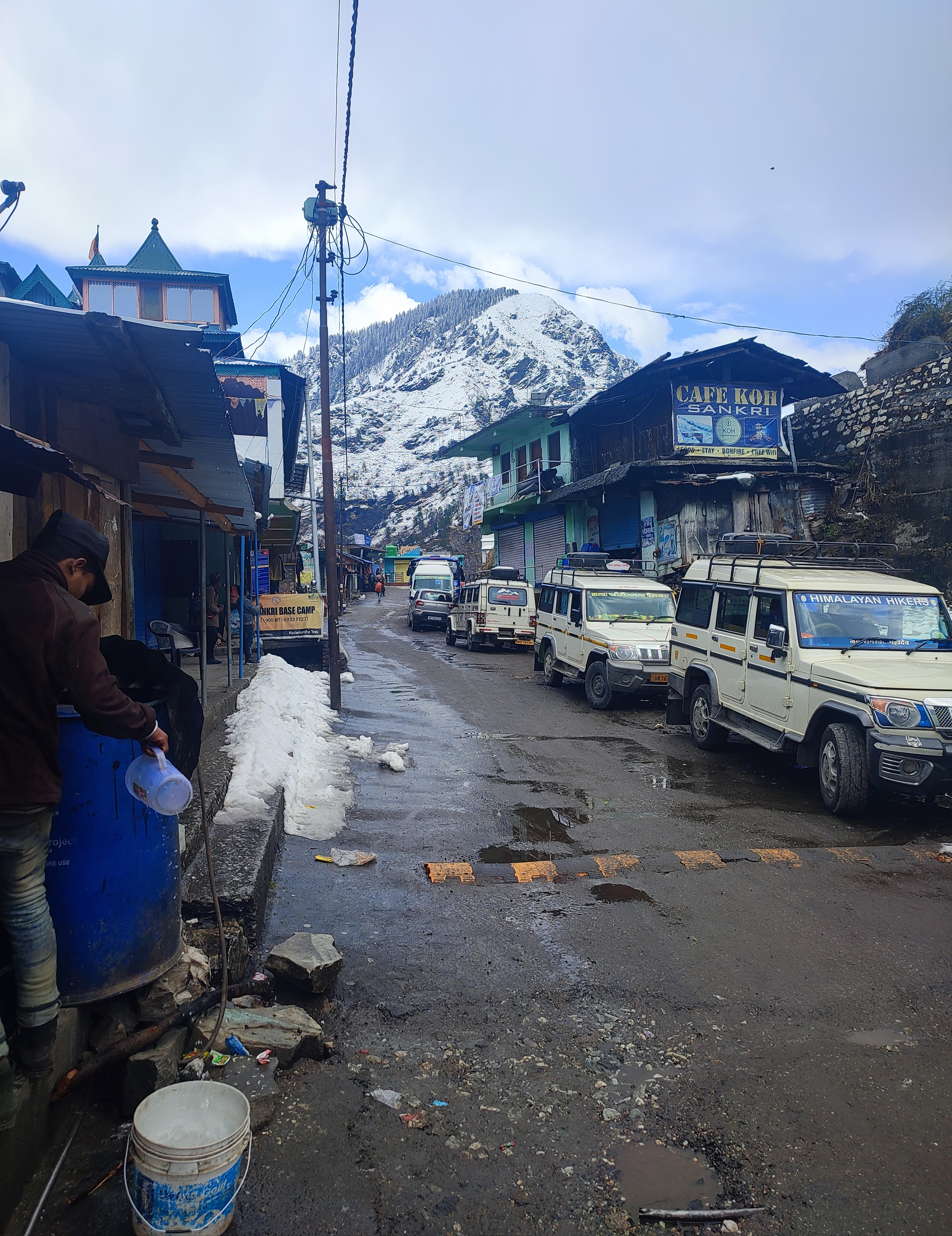

One has to go through Dehradun to reach Sankri. The route from Dehradun to Sankri is 200 km long that can be completed by taxis or government buses from Dehradun. There is no road beyond Sankri village; hence this village is also considered as the last road of Govind Wildlife Sanctuary. Unlike other villages present in Uttarakhand, the lush greenery of the Himalayan valley is seen inside Sankri. Sankri is the only village present in Uttarakhand, situated between mountains, deodar forests, and rivers like Supin, Tons and Kedarganga.

== Trekking Destinations ==
Sankri serves as a base camp for many treks in the western Garhwal Himalayas. Some of the accessible destinations are mentioned below-

- Kedarkantha Peak: The peak is known for its moderatly easy trail and thrilling summit climb. The trail includes campsites such as Juda Ka Talab, Kedarkantha Base Camp, and Hargaon. It reaches an altitude of 12,500 feet with a steep summit climb; however, the overall difficulty is considered easy to moderate. The summit offers 360-degree Himalayan views, including Mt. Swargarohini, Mt. Bandarpunch, Black Peak, and other mountain ranges.
- Har ki Dun Valley: The valley is famous as a traditional cultural trek that passes through villages including Taluka, Dhatmeer, Gangad, and Osla. The route to the valley follows the Supin River and moves through dense deodar forests. Mt Swargarohini can be seen up close from the Har ki Dun Valley.
- Bali Pass: This mountain pass connects two valleys, Har Ki Dun Valley and Yamunotri Valley. Moving ahead from Sankri, the route reaches 16,200 feet at Bali Pass with a steep and difficult climb.

== Accessibility ==
- By train: The nearest railway station is Dehradun Railway Station, approximately 200 km from Sankri.
- By air: Located about 30 km southeast of Dehradun city, Jolly Grant Airport (DED) is the nearest airport to Sankri.

Mountain Sankri

== Weather ==
The village receives annual snowfall in the months of January and February. The average temperature is estimated to be in the range of 10 to 15 degrees celsius and the annual precipitation is about 1328 mm.
