= Kush Kalyan =

Kush Kalyan Bugyal
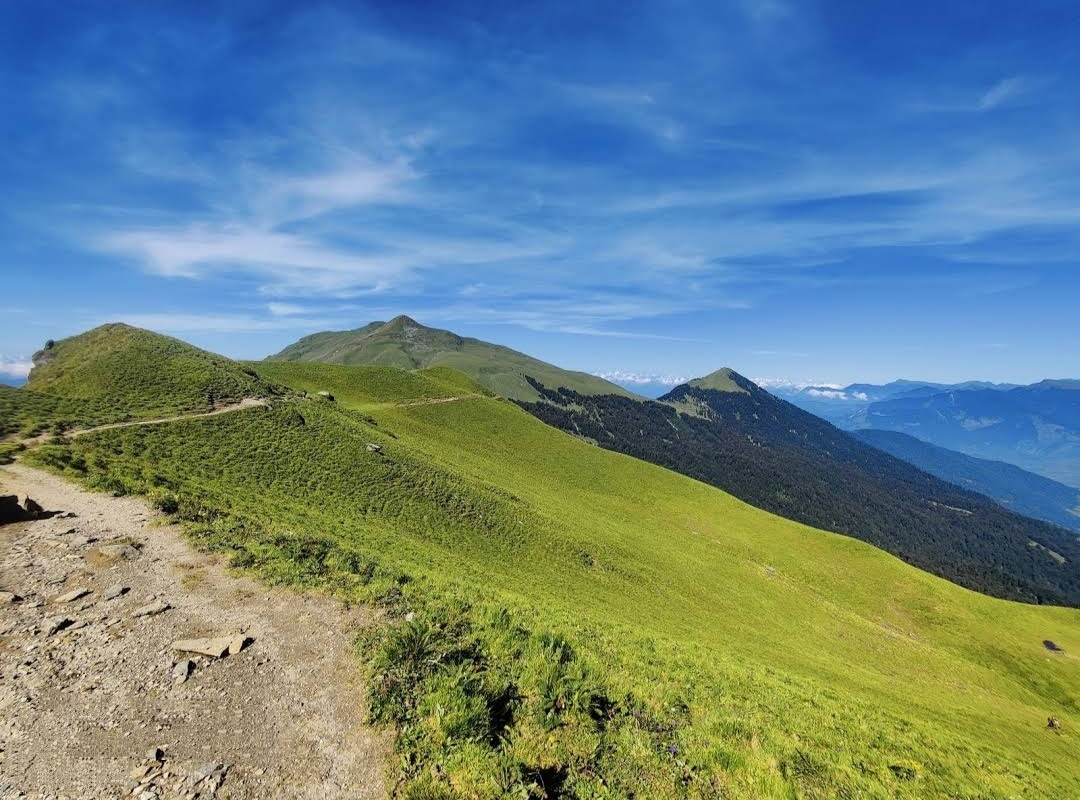
- Kush Kalyan Bugyal

Highest point
- Elevation: 3,682 m (12,080 ft)
- Coordinates: 30.704°N 78.660°E

Geography
- Location: Uttarkashi district, Uttarakhand, India
- Parent range: Garhwal Himalaya

"Kush Kalyan" is a bugyal (Himalayan Alpine Meadow) in the Tehri Garhwal district of Uttarakhand, India. Kush Kalyan Bugyal is a popular trekking and camping Destination. The Bugyal has the highest elevation of 3789m. The trek is of 16 km tow said and starts from Silla village, which is around 30 km from Uttarkashi. The trek to Kush Kalyan goes through dense forests, past lakes, and amongst wild flora and fauna.

Summer months of April and June and Post-Monsoon months of September and October are the best time to visit Kush Kalyan. The Bugyal is located on the old bridle route of Gangotri and Kedarnath. The Garhwal Himalayan peaks including Kalanag, Bandarpunch and Swargarohini can be seen from Kush Kalyan Bugyal. [Kush kalyan bugyal Trek www.greathimalayanhikers.com]
