= Nag Tibba =

Mountain in India

- Serpent's Peak
- Location within India

Highest point
- Elevation: 3,022 m (9,915 ft)
- Coordinates: 30°35′11″N 78°9′4″E

Geography
- Location: Jaunpur Range, Tehri Garhwal district, Uttarakhand, India
- Country: India
- State: Uttarakhand
- District: Tehri Garhwal
- Nearest city: New Tehri
- Parent range: Garhwal Himalaya

Nag Tibba ("Serpent's Peak"), at an elevation of 3,022 metres (9,915 ft), is the highest peak in the Lesser Himalayan region of the Garhwal Division of Uttarakhand state in India and of the Bugyals region. It lends its name to the Nag Tibba Range, itself the next-northerly of the five folds of the Himalayas. It is situated 16 km (9.9 mi) away from Landour cantonment, 57 kilometres (35 mi) from Mussoorie and 148 kilometres (92 mi) from New Tehri in the Tehri Garhwal district of Uttarakhand. The Nag Tibba Range is one of the three principal ranges of the Lesser Himalayas, along with the Dhauladhar and the Pir Panjal, which branch off from the Great Himalayas.

== Importance ==
The mountain is believed to be the abode of Nag Devta or God of Snakes, from which it borrows the first part of its name; "Tibba" is a local word for hill or peak. Together, "Nag Tibba" means the place or abode of the Snake God. It has a temple on the top, from which one can see the entire Bandarpoonch ranges of the Great Indian Himalayas towards the Yumnotri side. Local villagers come here to offer their prayers to Nag Devta for the protection of their cattle. This place is at an elevation of 3048 meters.
