= Har Ki Doon =

Himalaya valley in Uttarakhand, India

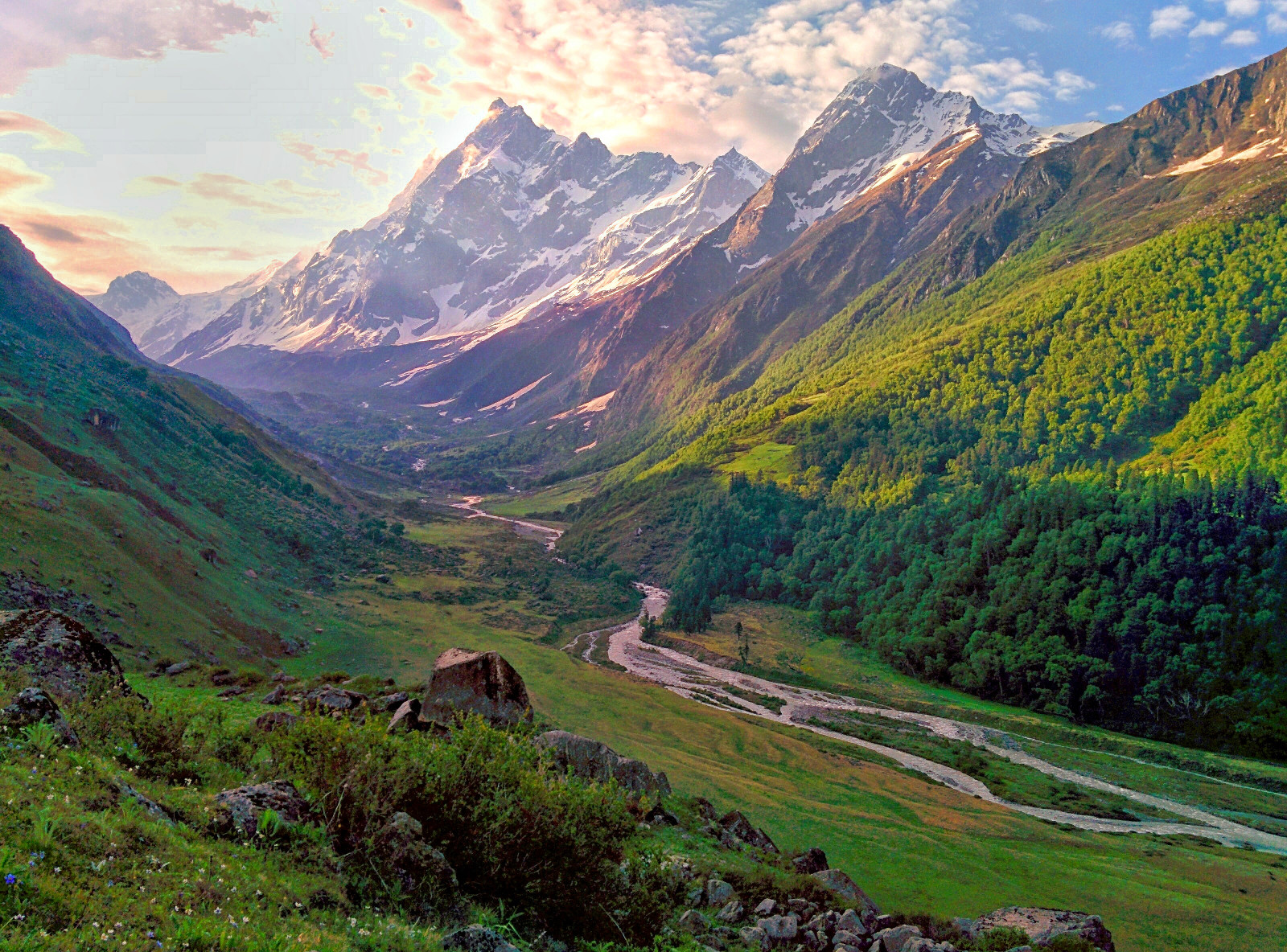
A portion of the valley, a river which flows through it, and the peak Swargarohini.

Har Ki Doon or Har Ki Dun is a cradle-shaped hanging valley in the Garhwal Himalayas of Uttarakhand, India. The region is surrounded with green Bugyals (High Altitude Meadows). It is surrounded by snow-covered peaks and alpine vegetation. It is connected to Baspa Valley by the Borasu Pass.

This valley is about 3566 m (11700 ft) above mean sea level and is snow-covered from October to March. In the final village along the trek, there stands a temple dedicated to Lord Shiva.

Purola has the last ATM point before Sankri (Basecamp). Sankri is the last place before starting a trek with a stable mobile signal.
