= Geography of Uttarakhand =

- Continent: Asia
- Region: India
- Area
  - Total: 53,483 km^{2} (20,650 sq mi)
- Coastline: 0 km (0 mi)
- Borders: (China) Tibet Autonomous Region (Nepal) Sudurpashchim Pradesh (India) Uttar Pradesh (India) Himachal Pradesh
- Highest point: Nanda Devi; 7,817 metres (25,646 ft)
- Lowest point: Sharda Sagar Reservoir; 187 metres (614 ft)
- Longest river: Ganges
- Largest lake: Ramganga–Sonanadi Reservoir

Uttarakhand has a total geographic area of 53,483 km^{2}, of which 86% is mountainous and 65% is covered by forest. Most of the northern parts of the state are part of Greater Himalaya ranges, covered by the high Himalayan peaks and glaciers, while the lower foothills were densely forested till denuded by the British log merchants and later, after independence, by forest contractors. Recent efforts in reforestation, however, have been successful in restoring the situation to some extent. The unique Himalayan ecosystem plays host to many animals (including bharal, snow leopards, leopards and tigers), plants and rare herbs. Two of India's great rivers, the Ganges and the Yamuna take birth in the glaciers of Uttarakhand, and are fed by myriad lakes, glacial melts and streams.

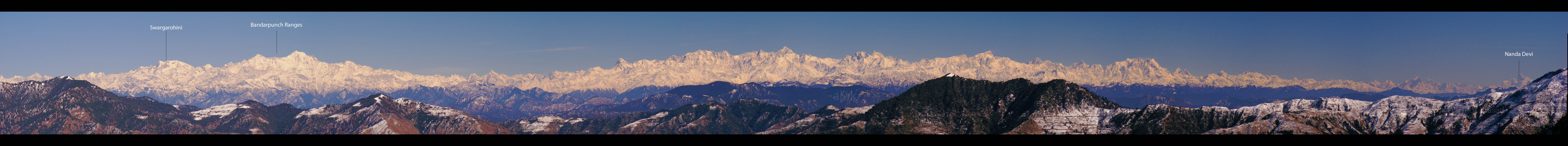
A panorama of Garhwal Himalaya from Dhanaulti

== Terrain and vegetation ==
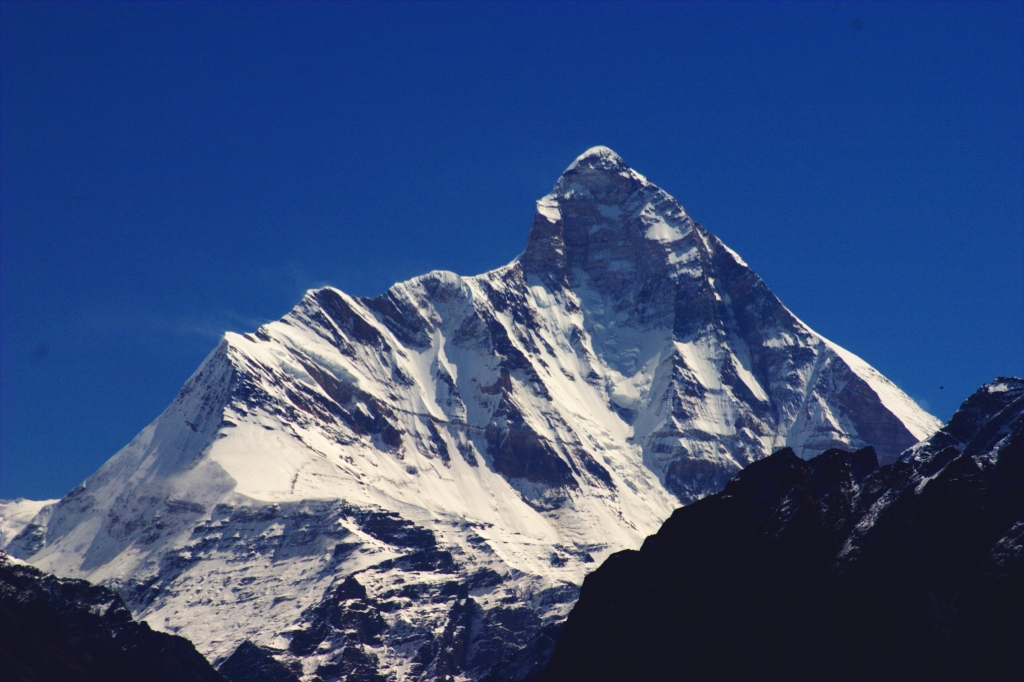
With the elevation of 7,817 metres (25,646 ft) above sea level, Nanda Devi is the highest mountain in Uttarakhand and the second-highest mountain in India, following Kangchenjunga in Sikkim.

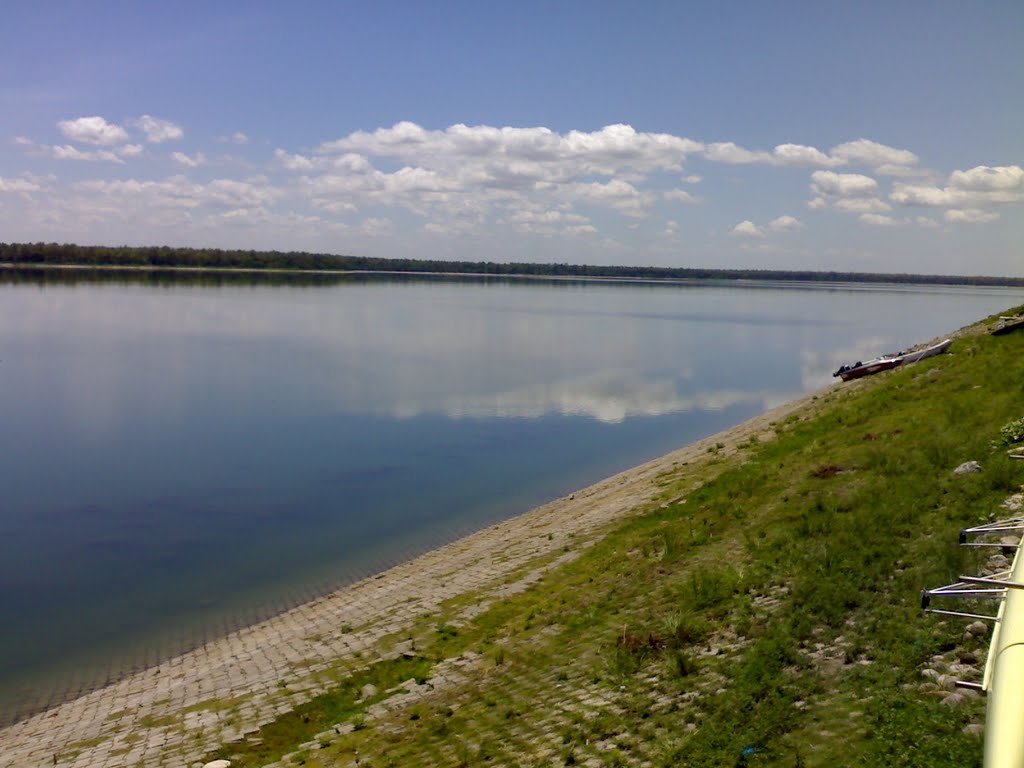
With the elevation of 187 metres (614 ft) above sea level, Sharda Sagar Reservoir is the lowest land point in Uttarakhand.

Uttarakhand lies on the southern slope of the Himalaya range, and the climate and vegetation vary greatly with elevation, from glaciers at the highest elevations to tropical forests at the lower elevations. The highest elevations are covered by ice and bare rock. Nanda Devi is the highest land point of Uttarakhand with the altitude of 7,817 metres (25,646 ft) above sea level. Sharda Sagar Reservoir is the lowest land point of Uttarakhand with the altitude of 187 metres (614 ft). Western Himalayan alpine shrub and meadows occur between 3,000 and 5,000 metres (9,800 and 16,400 ft): tundra and alpine meadows cover the highest elevations, Rhododendron-dominated shrublands cover the lower elevations. Western Himalayan subalpine conifer forests lie just below the tree line; at 3,000 to 2,600 metres (9,800 to 8,500 ft) elevation they transition to western Himalayan broadleaf forests, which lie in a belt from 2,600 to 1,500 metres (8,500 to 4,900 ft) elevation. Below 1,500 metres (4,900 ft) elevation lie the Himalayan subtropical pine forests. The drier Terai-Duar savanna and grasslands belt and the Upper Gangetic Plains moist deciduous forests cover the lowlands along the Uttar Pradesh border. This belt is locally known as Bhabar. These lowland forests have mostly been cleared for agriculture, but a few pockets remain.

During the last five years Uttarakhand witnessed number of forest fires. These fires include 2020 Uttarakhand forest fire and many others. Some of the consequences of these forest fires include loss of life, shrinking of forest areas, loss of biodiversity and decrease in Ecotourism in the state.

== National parks ==
Indian National Parks in Uttarakhand include the Jim Corbett National Park previously named as Hailey National Park (the oldest national park of India) in Nainital District and Pauri Garhwal District, Valley of Flowers National Park and Nanda Devi National Park in Chamoli District, which together are a UNESCO World Heritage Site, Rajaji National Park in Haridwar District, Dehradun District and Pauri Garhwal District and Govind Pashu Vihar National Park and Gangotri National Park in Uttarkashi District.

== See also ==
- List of mountain peaks of Uttarakhand
- Lakes of Kumaon hills
- Nanda Devi and Valley of Flowers National Parks
- Indomalayan realm
- Himalayan states
- Indian Himalayan Region
- Ecology of the Himalayas
- Geology of the Himalayas
- Geography of India
- Geology of India
