= Panwali Kantha Bugyal =

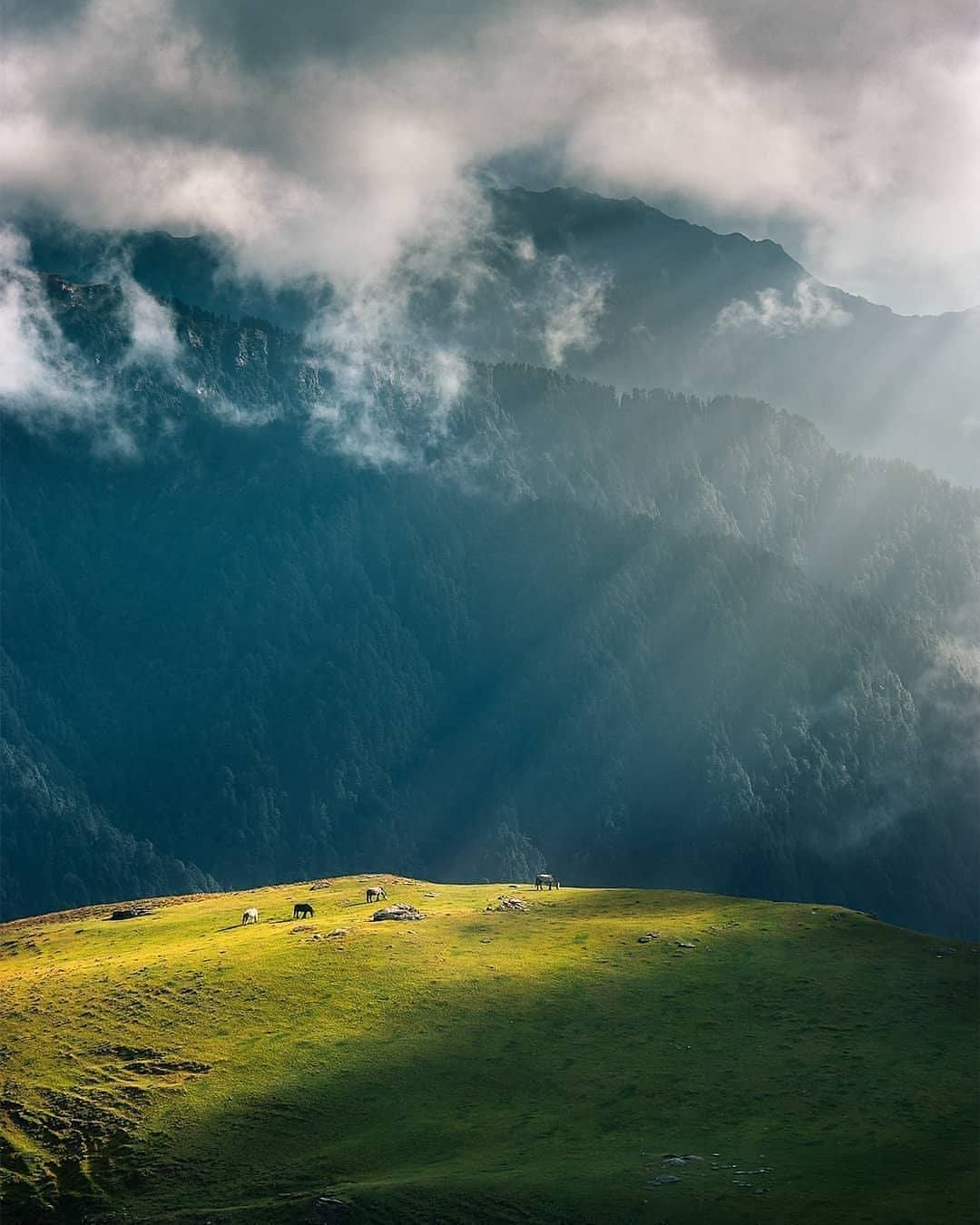
- Panwali Kantha Bugyal

Highest point
- Elevation: 3,368 m (11,050 ft)
- Coordinates: 30.5659245°N 78.8641914°E

Geography
- Location: Tehri Garhwal, Uttarakhand, India
- Parent range: Garhwal Himalaya

Panwali Kantha Bugyal is a Himalayan Alpine Meadow (commonly known as Bugyal) in the Tehri Garhwal district of Uttarakhand. Panwali Kantha Bugyal is a trekking and hiking Destination. The Bugyal has an average elevation of 3368m and is around 90 km from New Tehri. It is an alpine meadow which has expanse of grass land. It has a well maintained trek route. The trek to Panwali Kantha Bugyal passes through lush vegetation of rhododendrons, oak and deodar forests.

There is green grass all over the meadow during the monsoons. The trail is decked with red and pink rhododendron, during months of April and May. During the winter season, the whole meadow is covered with snow. This place offers scenic views of the Char Dham ranges. The trek starts from Uttarkashi at Gangotri's side and from Trijuginarayan at Kedarnath's side. It is also accessible from Ghuttu Village which is about 30 km from Ghansali It is also accessible from Ghuttu Village which is about 30 km from Ghansali.
