= Gorson Bugyal =

Himalayan alpine meadow

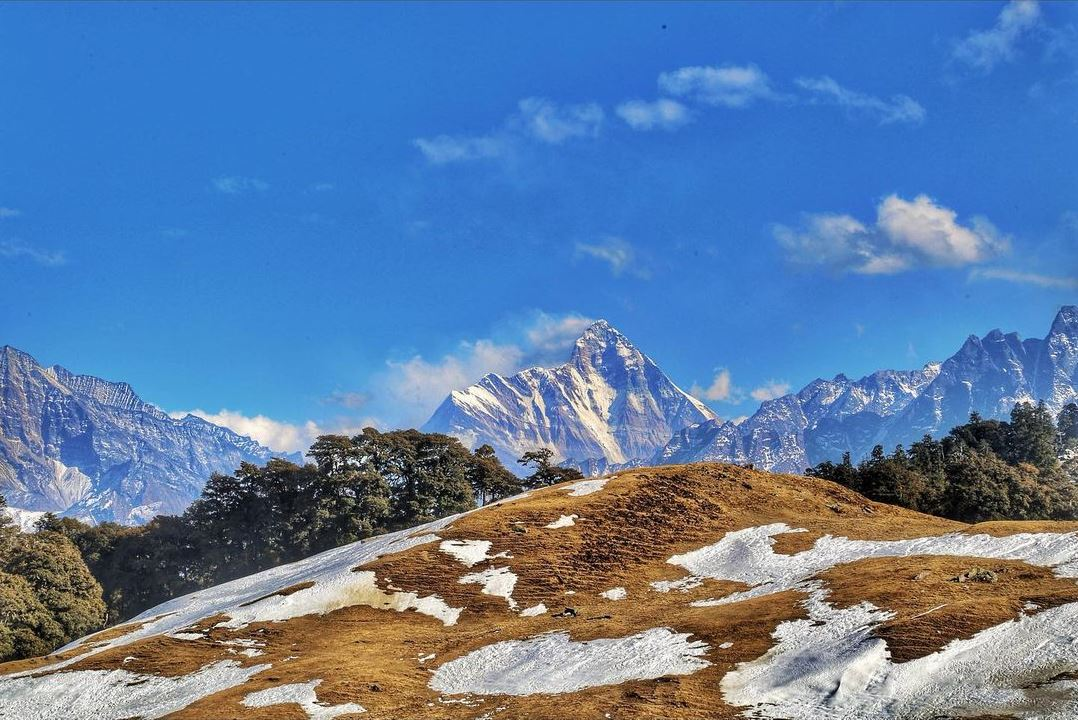
- Gorson Bugyal

Highest point
- Elevation: 3,519 m (11,545 ft)
- Coordinates: 30.5033812°N 79.5692754°E

Geography
- Location: Chamoli, Uttarakhand, India
- Parent range: Garhwal Himalaya

Gorson Bugyal is a Himalayan Alpine Meadow (commonly known as Bugyal) in Auli, Chamoli district of Uttarakhand. Gorson Bugyal is a skiing destination. The Bugyal has an average elevation of 3519m and is around 19 km from Joshimath. It is a large alpine meadow which has expanse of grass land that covers several hundred acres of land. It has a well maintained trek route. The trek to Gorson Bugyal passes through lush vegetation of apple orchards, oak and deodar forests.

There is green grass all over the meadow during the spring season and is considered the best time for trekking and camping. During the winter season, the whole meadow is covered with snow. This area has views of Nanda Devi and Nanda Ghunti. Chattarkund, located just 1 km away from Gorson Bugyal is known for its sweet water and is located in centre of a dense forest.

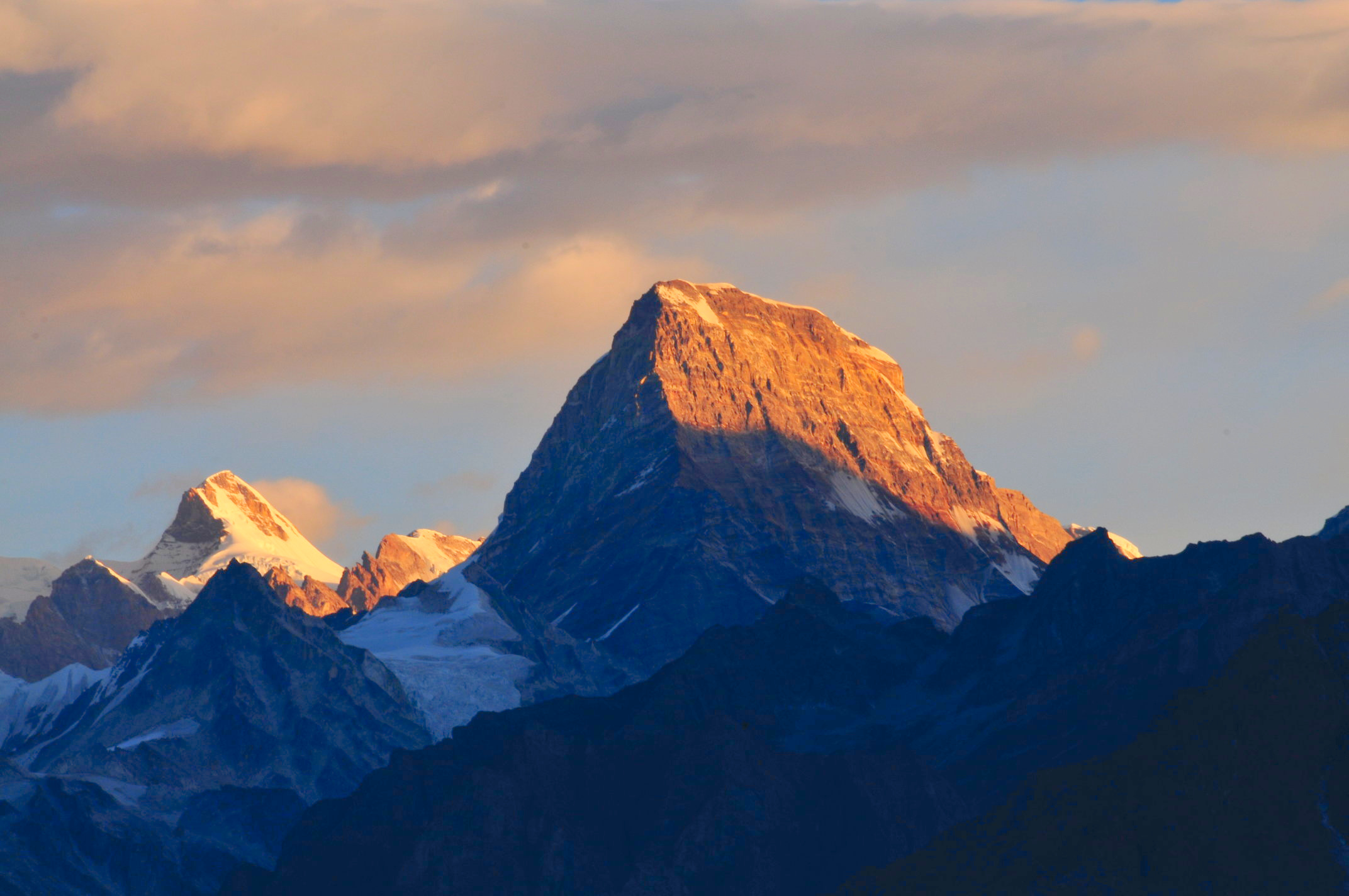
Nilgiri Parbat From Gorson Bugyal

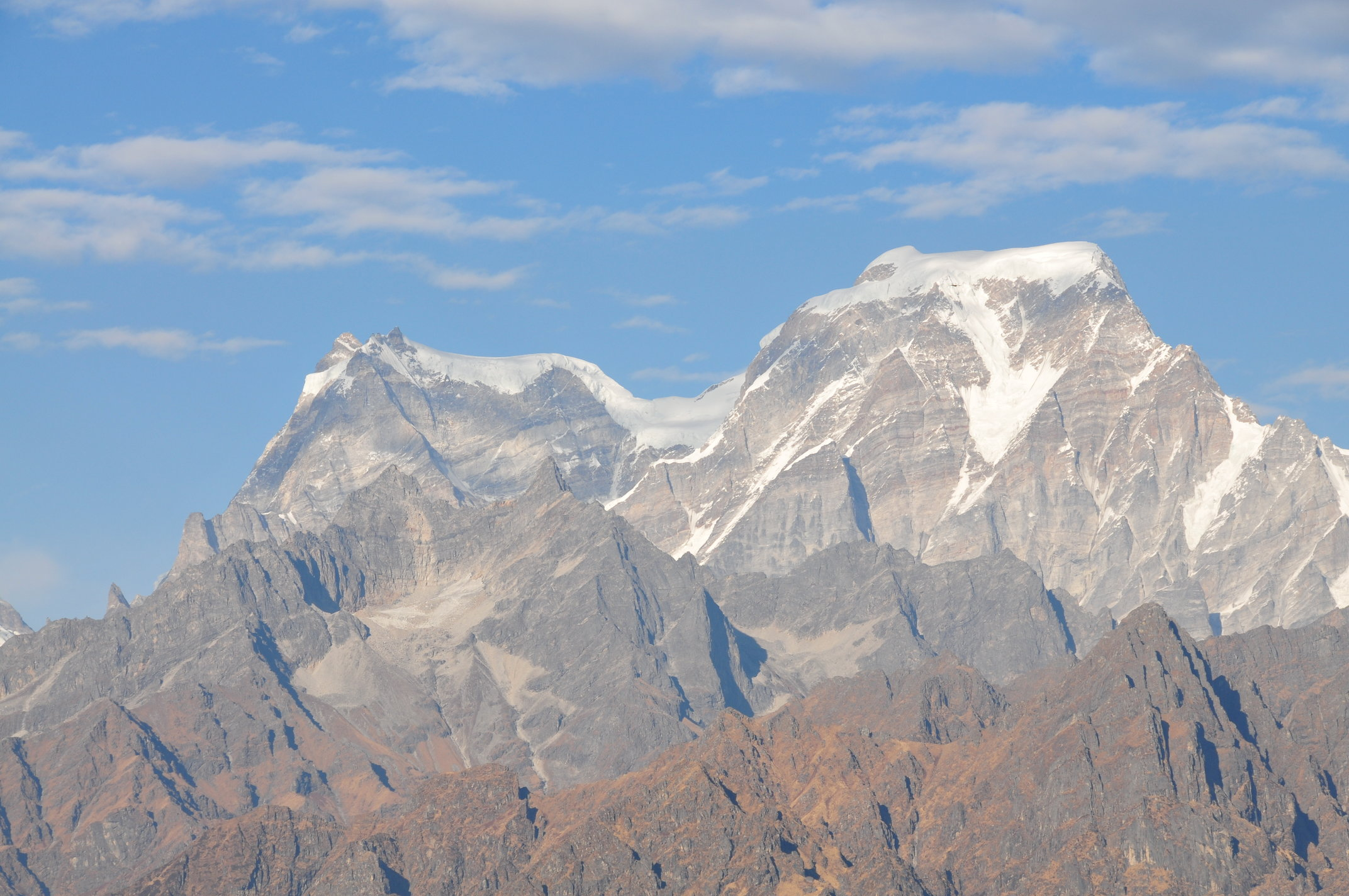
Hathi Parbat from Gorson Bugyal
