= Roopkund =

Lake in Uttarakhand, India

- Mystery Lake; Skeleton Lake
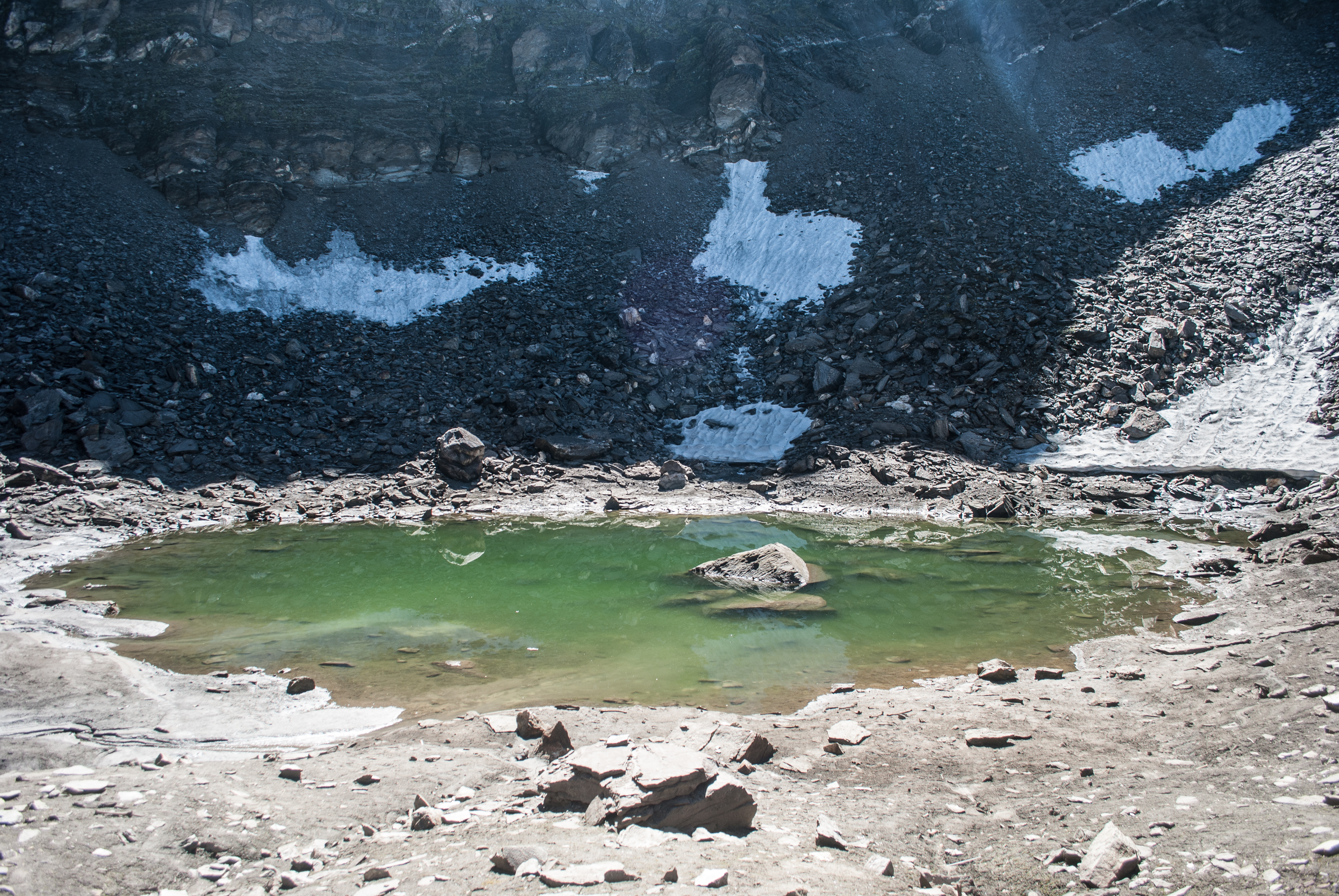
- Roopkund lake in August 2014

- Location within Uttarakhand Location within India
- Interactive map of Roopkund
- Location: Chamoli, Uttarakhand
- Coordinates: 30°15′44″N 79°43′54″E
- Average depth: 3 m (9.8 ft)
- Surface elevation: 4,536 m (14,882 ft)

Roopkund, locally known as Mystery Lake or Skeleton Lake, is a high-altitude glacial lake in Himalayas at an altitude of 5,020 m (16,470 ft), between Trishul peak (7,120 m) and Nanda Ghunti peak (6,310 m), in the Chamoli District of Uttarakhand state of India. Surrounded by rock-strewn glaciers and snow-clad mountains, Roopkund is a popular trekking destination. The size of the lake varies substantially, but it is seldom more than 40 m in diameter (1000 to 1500 m^{2} in area), and is frozen in the winter.

With a depth of about three metres, Roopkund is widely known for the hundreds of human skeletons found at the edge of the lake. The human skeletal remains are visible at its bottom when the snow melts. Initial investigations led some to believe they were the remains of a semi-legendary event when a single group was killed in a sudden and violent hailstorm in the 9th century, but scientific research has subsequently shown that the remains belong to three distinct ancestry groups who died in two independent events; around 800 CE and 1800 CE respectively. Because of the human remains, the lake has been called "Skeleton Lake" in recent times.

== Human skeletons ==
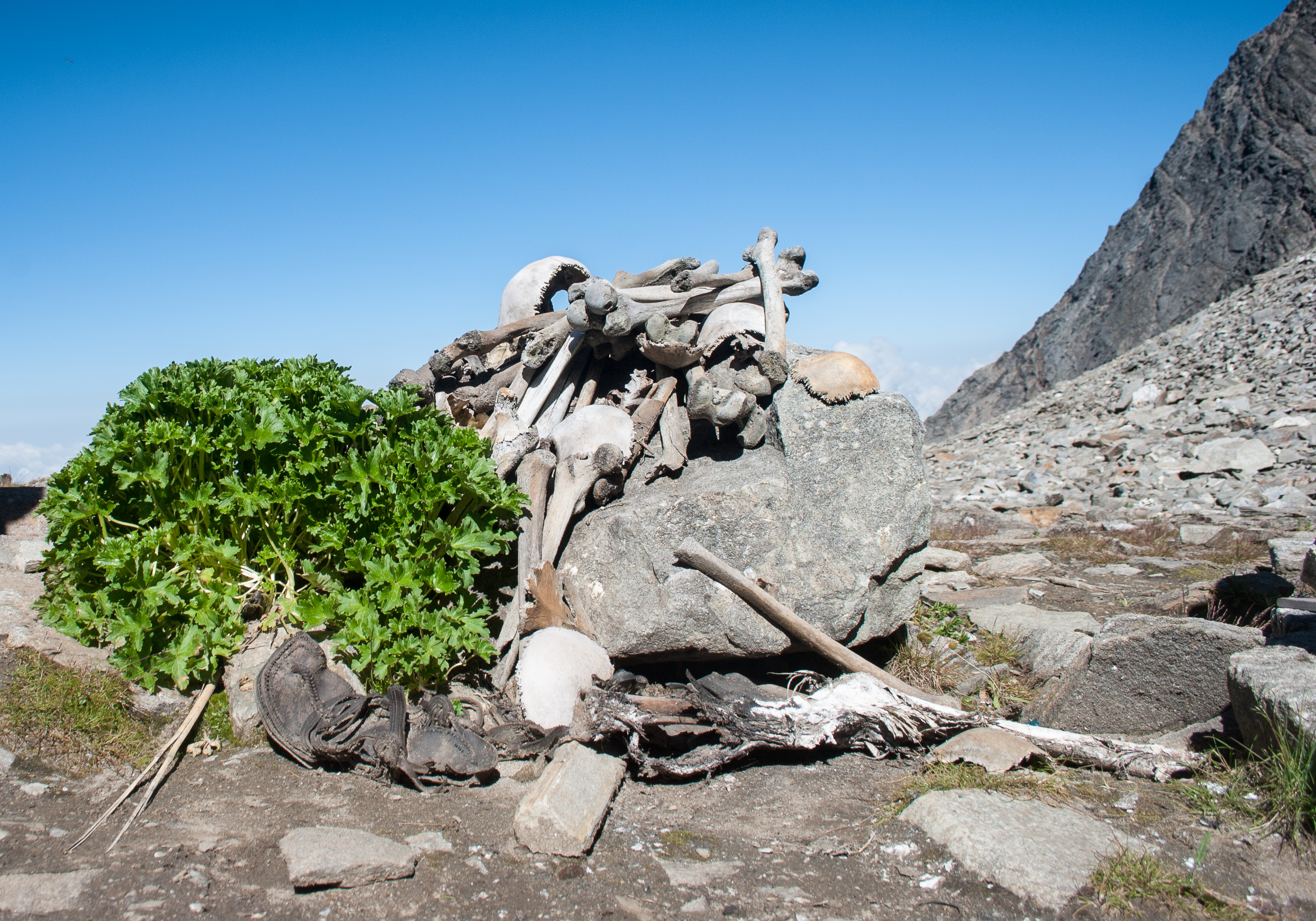
Human skeletons at Roopkund Lake.

Skeletons were rediscovered in 1942 by a forest ranger of the Nanda Devi National Park, named Hari Kishan Madhwal. At first, British authorities feared that the skeletons represented casualties of a hidden Japanese invasion force, but it was found that the skeletons were far too old to be Japanese soldiers. The skeletons are visible in the clear water of the shallow lake during one month when the ice melts. Along with the skeletons, wooden artefacts, iron spearheads, leather slippers, and rings were also found. When a team from National Geographic retrieved about 30 skeletons in 2003, flesh was still attached to some of them.

Local legend says that the King of Kanauj, Raja Jasdhaval, with his pregnant wife, Rani Balampa, their servants, a dance troupe and others went on a pilgrimage to Nanda Devi shrine, and the group faced a storm with large hailstones, from which the entire party perished near Roopkund Lake.

=== Identification ===
Remnants belonging to more than 300 people have been found. The Anthropological Survey of India conducted a study of the skeletons during the 1950s and some samples are displayed at the Anthropological Survey of India Museum, Dehradun. The studies of the skeletons revealed head injuries; according to some sources, these injuries were caused by round objects from above, and were the common cause of death amongst the deceased. Those researchers concluded that the victims had been caught in a sudden hailstorm, just as described in local legends and songs. Radiocarbon dating of the bones at Oxford University's Radiocarbon Accelerator Unit determined the time of death to be 850 CE ±30 years. More recently, radiocarbon dating combined with genome-wide analysis of 38 individuals from Roopkund Lake, found that the remains are from different eras and belong to three distinct groups. A group of 23 individuals (dated ~800 CE) had typical South Asian ancestry, one individual (dated ~1800 CE) had Southeast Asian ancestry, analyzed as roughly 82% Malay and 18% Vietnamese, and 14 individuals (dated ~1800 CE) had ancestry typical of the eastern Mediterranean, and specifically of present-day people from mainland Greece and Crete. Those findings counter the theory that the individuals died in a single catastrophic event. The radiocarbon dating further suggests that the older, South Asian remains were deposited over an extended period of time, while the younger, eastern Mediterranean and Southeast Asian remains were deposited during a single event.

=== Conservation concerns ===
There is growing concern about the regular loss of skeletons and it is feared that, if steps are not taken to conserve them, the skeletons may gradually vanish in the years to come. It is reported that tourists visiting the area are in the habit of taking back the bones in large numbers and the district administration has expressed the need to protect the area. The district magistrate of Chamoli District has reported that tourists, trekkers, and curious researchers are transporting the skeletons on mules and recommended that the area should be protected. Government agencies have made efforts to develop the area as an eco-tourism destination to protect the skeletons.

== Tourism ==
=== Festivals ===
A religious festival is held at the alpine meadow of Bedni Bugyal every autumn with nearby villages participating. A larger celebration, the Nanda Devi Raj Jat, takes place once every twelve years at Roopkund, during which Goddess Nanda is worshipped.

=== Natural landscape ===
Roopkund is a picturesque tourist destination and one of the important places for trekking. To the north of Roopkund lie three peaks—Trishul, Nanda Ghunti, and Junargali—while Chandania Kot peak is to the east. Roopkund is situated in a bowl-like depression at the base of the Trishul massif. The lake is flanked by the rock face of Junargali to the north and the peak of Chandania Kot to the east. Trekkers climb the Junargali peak to get a better view of Trishul and Nanda Ghunti and other areas to the north of Roopkund.

=== Trekking ===
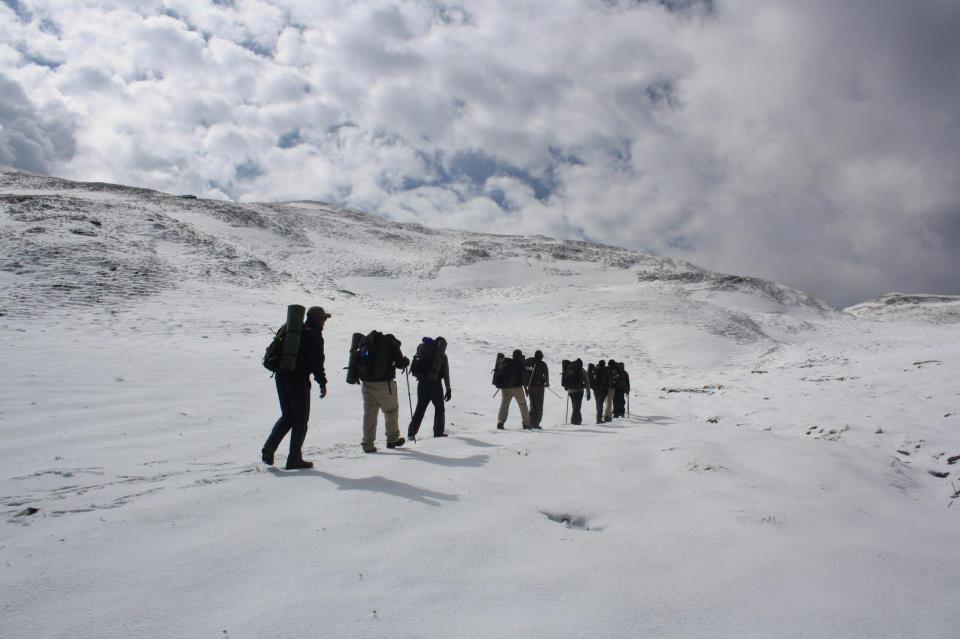
Trekking path to Roopkund, passing near Bedni Bugyal

The Roopkund lake is covered with ice for most of the year, with the best time to trek being in autumn (mid-September to October). Trekkers have several options of, shorter or longer, as well as easier or strenuous routes. The typical trek from Lohajung to Roopkund is a multi-day trek via medows (bugyals) and snow-covered alpine areas, often taking five days. Motorable roads are available till Lohajung (also called Loaganj, 10,400 ft elevation) starting point for trek, or further to Wan village (base camp for Route-1) and Didina village (base camp for Route-2). Route beyond Wan or Didna is on-foot only, and goes northeast via Bedni Bugyal high-altitute meadow campground approximately half-way to Roopkund, Patar Nachauni, Kelwa Vinayak temple, and Bhagwabasa, before reaching Roopkund. The final ascent to Roopkund from Bhagwabasa is a challenging climb. Guesthouses at Lohajung, Wan and Didina villages have paid homestays, and during the trekking season the camping is common in Ali Bugyal and Bedni Bugyal meadows.

- Route-1 Lohajung-Wan-Bedni Bugyal-Roopkund route:
  - The older, shorter, and steeper route, 53 km multi-day on-foot hiking trek to Roopkund is via Wan village. The trek starts from Lohaganj pass with a gentle hike to Wan village 15 km (7-8 hours) north from Lohajung, which is also used as the base camp for the trek. The 10–12 km (one-day) climb from Wan to Bedni Bugyal to the east is shorter but steeper well-marked ascent through dense forest. Wan is connected to Lohajung via motorbale road, where paid 45-minutes long jeep rides are available for hire; hence some trekkers choose to start the trek from the Wan itself.
- Route-2 Lohajung-Didna-Ali Bugyal-Bedni Bugyal-Roopkund route:
  - The trek via Didina village, 10 km (5 hours) northeast from Lohajung, is a bit longer as the Didina to Bedni Bugyal section is less steep and strenuous. Didina is connected to Lohajung via motorbale road, hence some trekkers choose to start the trek from the Didina itself.

== Transport ==
Roopkund is reachable by the Pantnagar Airport (250 km south), the Kathgodam Railway Station (235 km south; Karanprayag 80 km west will be the nearest railway station after Char Dham Railway is completed), or by road from Bageshwar (82 km southeast), Rudraprayag (115 km west), Pithoragarh (200 km southeast), and Kathgodam (235 km south).

== In popular culture ==
Roopkund's skeletons were featured in a National Geographic documentary, "Riddles of the Dead: Skeleton Lake". India's Centre for Cellular and Molecular Biology (CCMB) commissioned the documentary The Mysterious Frozen Lake in the Himalayas, where a scientific team and a film crew try to investigate the lake.

== See also ==
- Geography of Uttarakhand
- Tourism in Uttarakhand
- List of unsolved deaths
- Yatra, pilgrimages in the nearby area
- Char Dham
