= Moila Danda =

Alpine pasture land in Uttarakhand, India

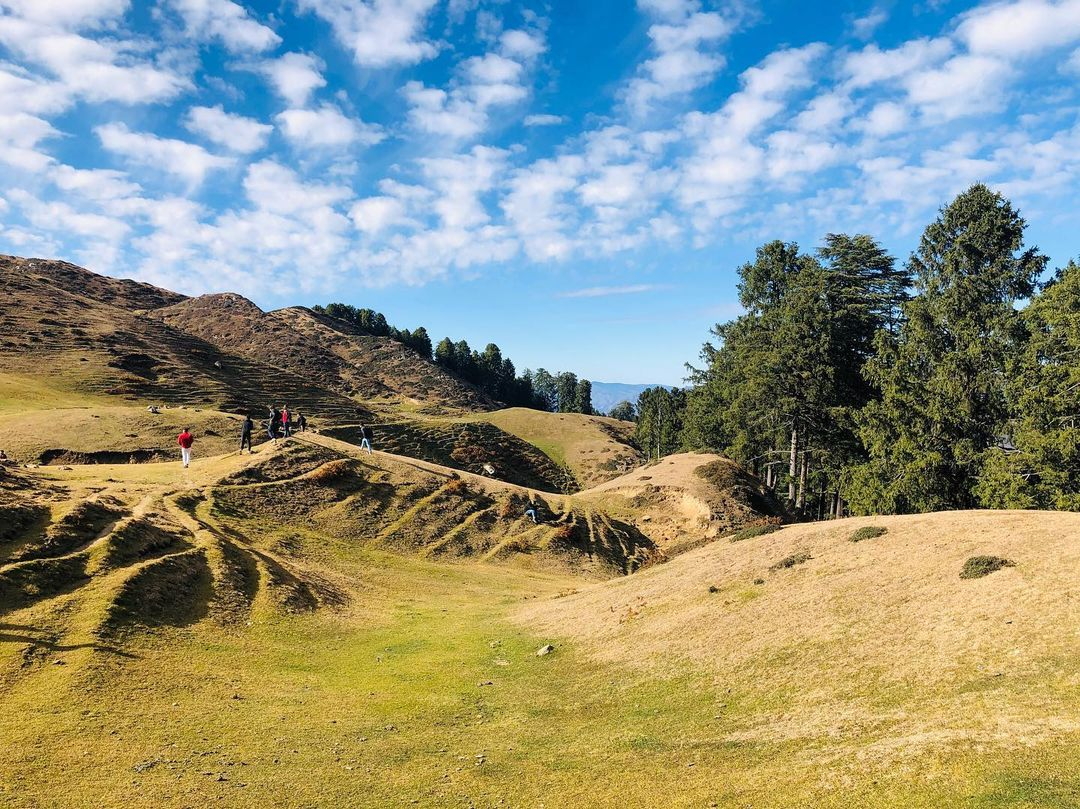
- Moila Danda

Highest point
- Elevation: 2,699 m (8,855 ft)
- Coordinates: 30.7768200°N 77.7845050°E

Geography
- Location: Dehradun district, Uttarakhand, India
- Parent range: Garhwal Himalaya

Moila Danda (lit. Moila Hill-top) also known as Moila Top, (Danda translates to pastures on higher peaks of the mountains in Mahasuic languages) is situated in the Jaunsar-Bawar region of the Dehradun district of Uttarakhand. Moila Danda is a hiking and camping destination. The Bugyal has the highest elevation of 2759m and is around 40km from Chakrata. Moila Danda is situated between thousands of Deodar trees. The trek to the Bugyal is of 3km and starts from Budher Forest Rest House, which is around 30km from Chakrata.

Budher Caves, situated at the corner of the Bugyal is also a place to visit. Also, an ancient temple built in traditional Koti Banal architecture of Uttarakhand, is situated at the centre of the bugyal, dedicated to the fairy goddesses known as 'Pari mata' or 'Matriya Mata' believed to be residing there according to the locals. The glorious views of the Garhwal Himalayas can be seen from here.

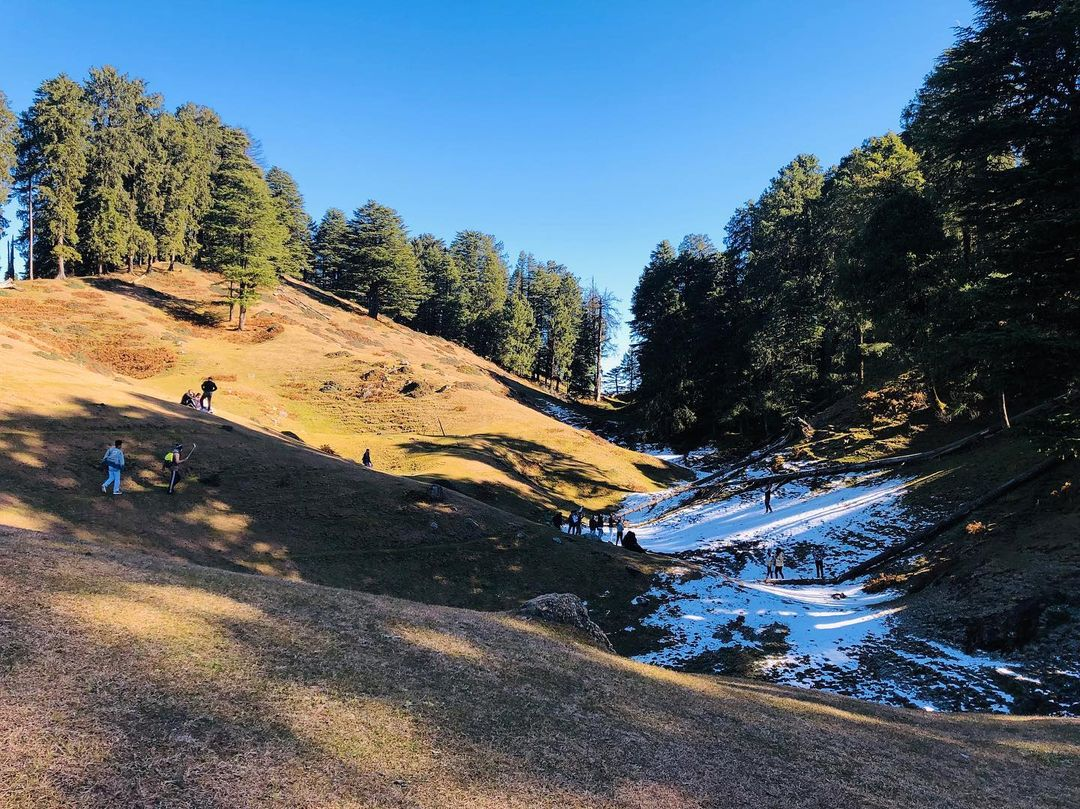
Moila Danda in late winters

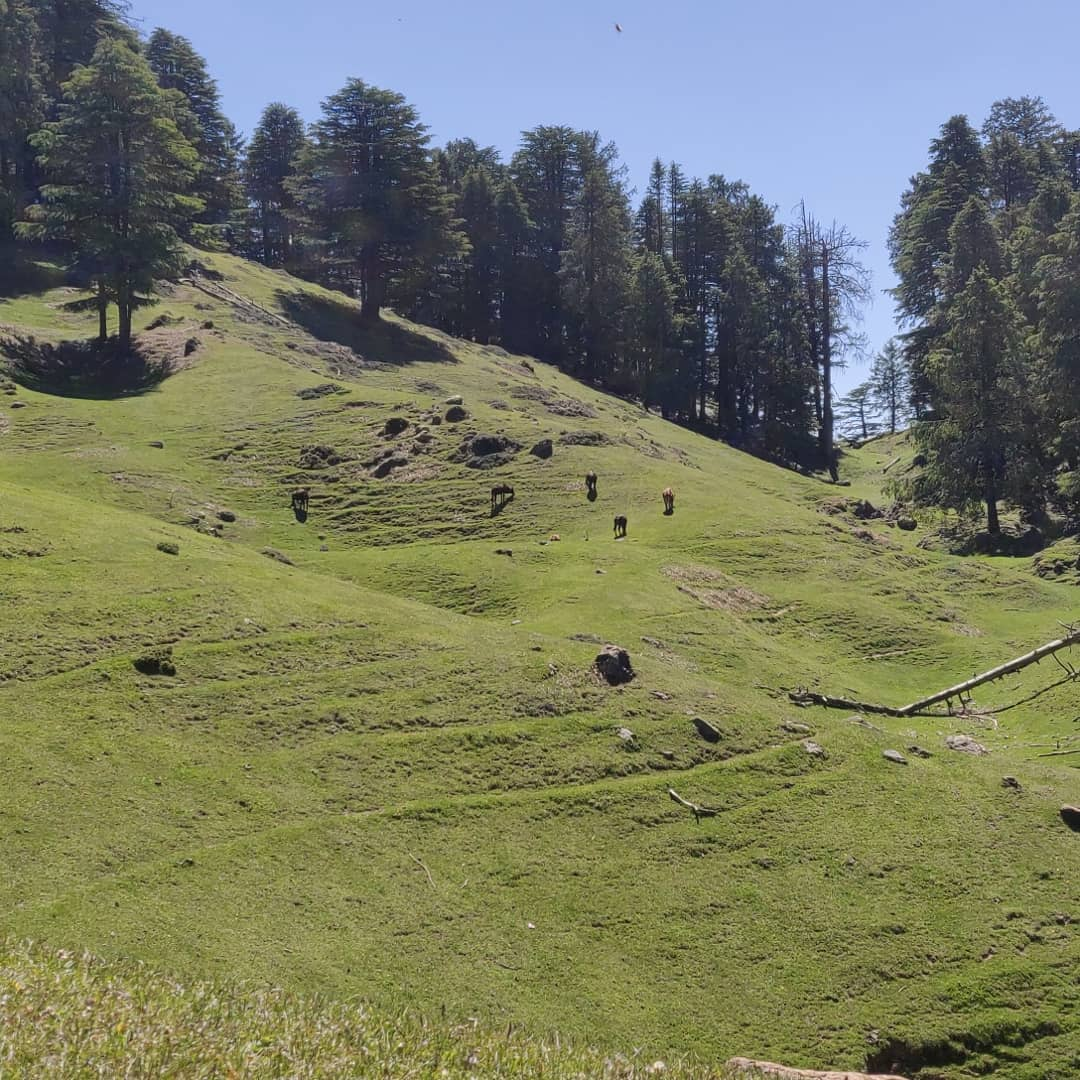
Moila Danda in Summers
