= Govind Pashu Vihar National Park =

Indian wildlife sanctuary

- IUCN category II (national park)
- Interactive map of Govind Pashu Vihar National Park
- Location: Uttarkashi district, Uttarakhand, India
- Area: 958 km^{2} (370 sq mi)

Govind Pashu Vihar National Park and Wildlife Sanctuary is a national park in Supin Range, near Uttarkashi town in the district and state of the same name in India. It was established initially as a wildlife sanctuary in 1955, and was later converted into a national park. It is named after prominent Indian freedom fighter and politician Govind Ballabh Pant, who became Home Minister in 1955 and is credited for establishing Hindi as an official language of India.

The park was established on 1 March 1955, and is situated in the Uttarkashi district in the Indian state of Uttarakhand. The park lies in the higher reaches of the Garhwal Himalayas. The total area of Govind Pashu Vihar National Park and Wildlife Sanctuary is 958 km^{2} (370 sq mi). The Snow Leopard Project started by the Government of India is being managed at this sanctuary. Also, it is one of the remaining strongholds in the Himalayas of the bearded vulture, a vital ecological catalyst.

== The park and its management ==
The altitude in the park ranges from 1,400 to 6,323 metres (4,593 to 20,745 ft) above sea level. Within the park is the Har Ki Doon valley which is a known spot for trekking, while the Ruinsiyara high altitude lake is also popular as a tourist destination. The Har-ki-dun Forest Rest House is known for its location amidst a valley of wild flowers. The forest rest houses of Naitwar, Taluka and Osla Are en route to Hari-ki-dun and attract large number of tourists.

The nearest town from the park is Dharkarhi, 17 km (11 mi) from the park. The nearest airport and railway station are in Dehradun at a distance of 190 km (120 mi).

Many visitors come to India in order to trek or to see the wildlife. State governments are engaged in managing national parks and wildlife sanctuaries, and may put the interests of tourists, and the money they bring into the state, before the interests of the indigenous peoples that live inside park boundaries. Before independence, the British managed this area for the extraction of timber, building roads and providing forest rest houses. After independence, the state forest department took on this role, regulations increased and timber extraction decreased. Other departments became involved, a motor road was built to Naitwar, schools, administrative buildings and a small hospital were built, immigrants arrived from Nepal and elsewhere and set up stalls, shops and restaurants. By 1988, the road had been extended for 20 km (12 mi) inside the park to Sankri and 300 visitors arrived that year. The road was further extended and in 1990, over one thousand tourists, mostly Indian, visited. By this time, several state departments were involved. The wildlife division of the forest department wanted to preserve the wildlife, exclude tourists and local people from certain areas, and plough back any funds they accumulated into upkeep of the park. The tourism department wanted to encourage the opening up of the area, the building of new roads and tourist accommodation, and was uninterested in the socio-development of the permanent park residents. Since then eco-tourism has further expanded, and tourists from all parts of the world now visit the park.

== Flora ==
The sanctuary contains western Himalayan broadleaf forests at its lowest elevations, transitioning to western Himalayan subalpine conifer forests and western Himalayan alpine shrub and meadows at its highest elevations. Trees present in the lower parts of the sanctuary include chir pine, deodar cedar, oak and other deciduous species. At altitudes over about 2,600 m (8,500 ft), common species include conifers such as blue pine, silver fir, spruce, yew, and deciduous species such as oak, maple, walnut, horse chestnut, hazel and rhododendron.

== Fauna ==
There are about fifteen species of large mammal in the sanctuary as well as about one hundred and fifty species of bird. This is the place from which the Indian Government has inaugurated the Snow Leopard Project. This project aims to provide special conservation measures to protect the snow leopard. This endangered predator is threatened by the decline in wild animals on which to prey, by being poached for its skin and body parts, and by being killed by farmers to protect their livestock. Other mammals found in the sanctuary include the Asian black bear, the brown bear, the common leopard, the musk deer, the bharal, the Himalayan tahr and the serow. Smaller mammals include the Indian crested porcupine, European otter, goral, civet, hedgehog, Himalayan field rat, Hodgson's giant flying squirrel, wild boar, masked palm civet and Sikkim mountain vole.

Birds found here include several endangered species such as the golden eagle, the steppe eagle and the black eagle, the bearded vulture, the Himalayan snowcock, the Himalayan monal pheasant, the cheer pheasant and the western tragopan. Smaller birds include owls, pigeons, minivets, thrushes, warblers, bulbuls, parakeets, cuckoos, tits, buntings and finches.
