= Kedarkantha =

Himalayan mountain

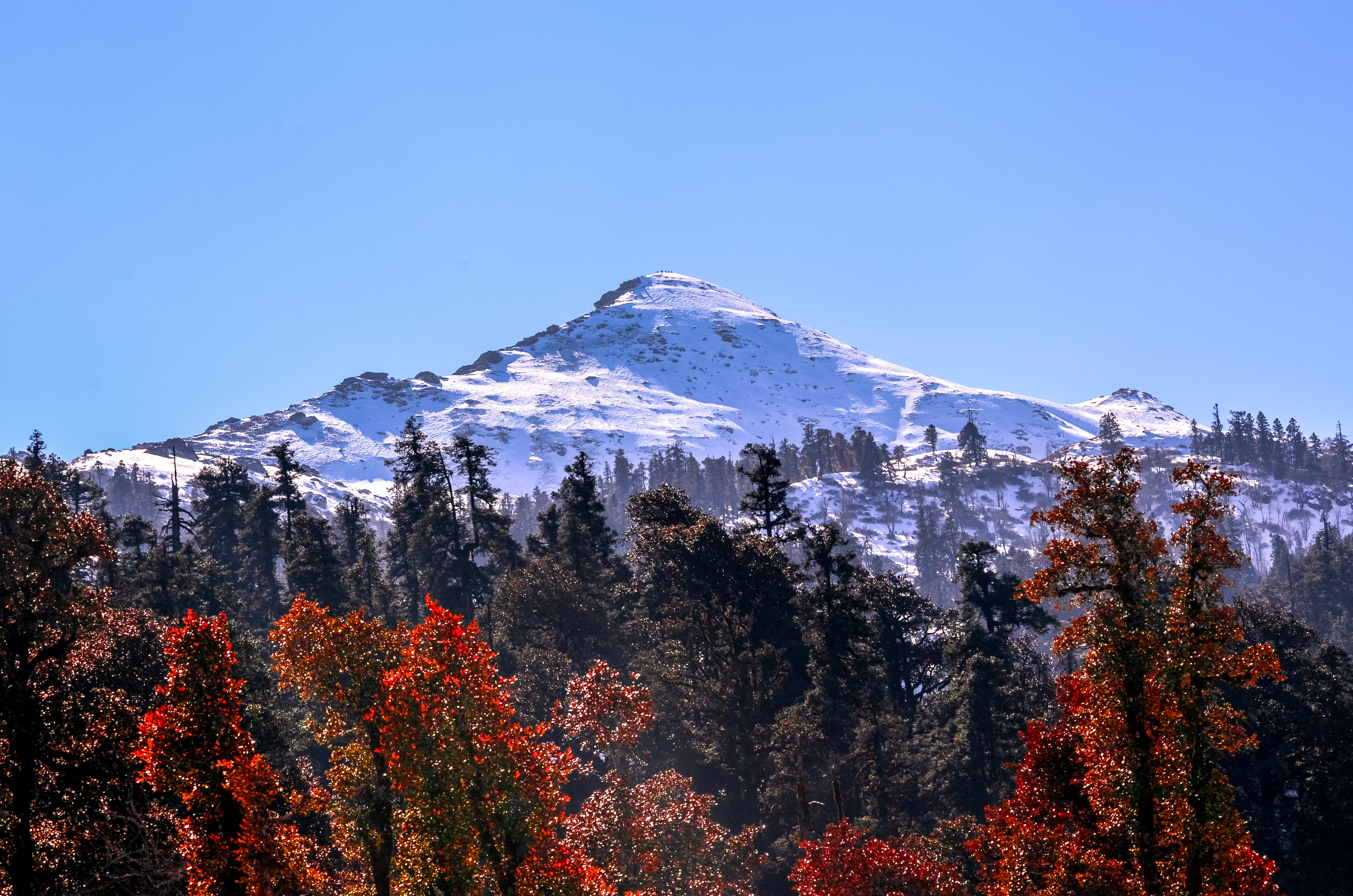

Highest point
- Elevation: 12,500 ft (3,800 m)
- Coordinates: 31°01′21″N 78°10′19″E

Geography
- Location within Uttarakhand Location within India
- Country: India
- State: Uttarakhand
- District: Uttarkashi
- Parent range: Garhwal Himalaya

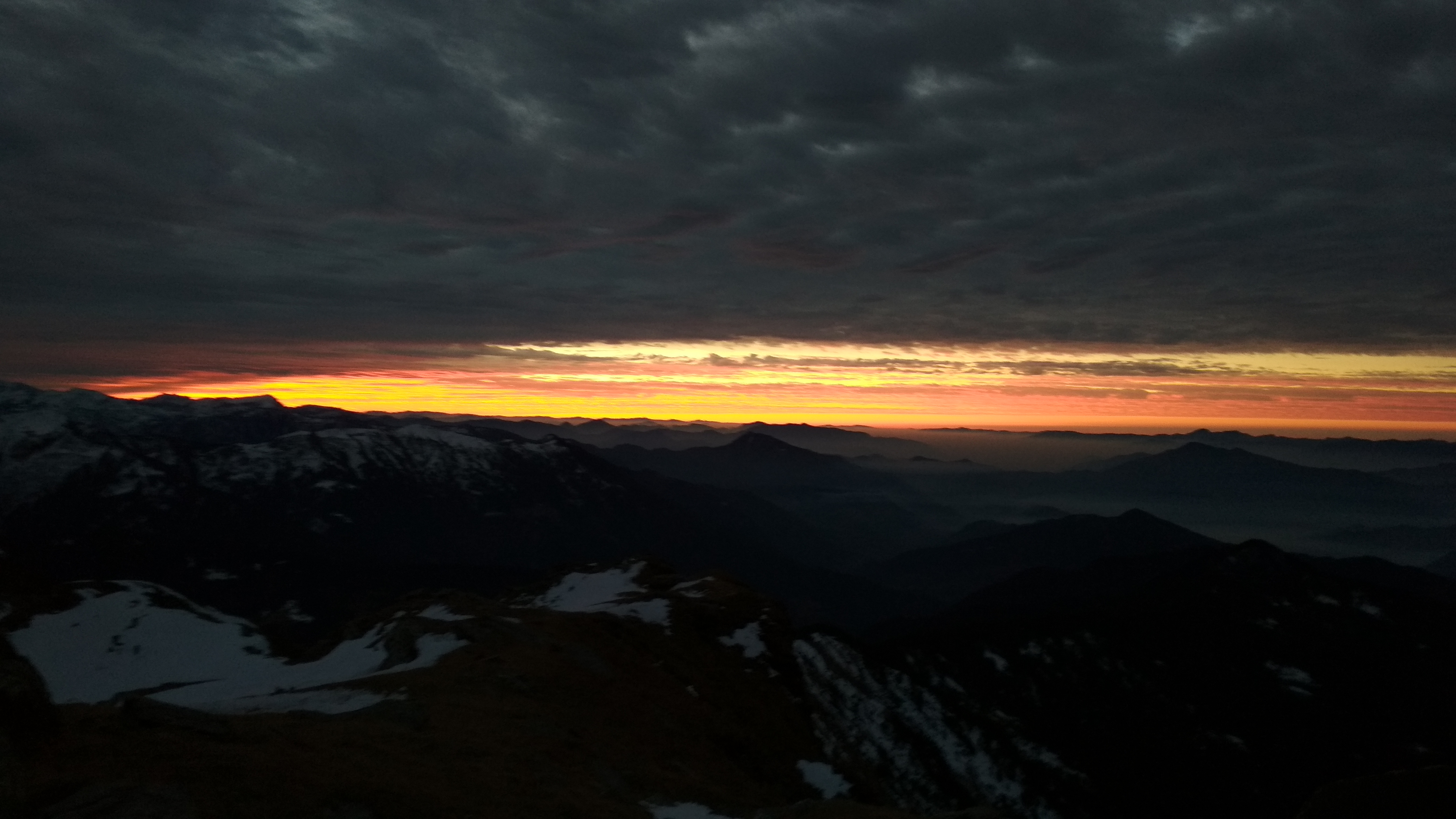
Sunrise view from Kedarkantha summit

Kedarkantha is a mountain peak of the Himalayas in Uttarakhand, India. Its elevation is 12,500 ft (3,800 m). Kedarkantha is located within Govind Wildlife Sanctuary in Uttarkashi district.

== Flora and fauna ==
The forest cover around Kedarkantha Peak is predominantly made up of pine trees. Between elevations of 2,000 meters to 3,000 meters, one can find forests of deodar, oak, and rhododendron. Deodar (from the Sanskrit words "deva" meaning divine and "daru" meaning tree) is traditionally used in the construction of temples. Oak and rhododendron wood is commonly utilized for making agricultural tools, while their leaves serve as fodder for livestock. These materials are often seen in use by the local villagers in the region.

The trail is adorned with a diverse range of floral species, including Reinwardtia (Yellow Himalayan Flax), Bauhinia variegata, Primula denticulata (Drumstick Primrose), Rhododendrons, Fragaria nubicola (Himalayan Wild Strawberries), Gentiana kurroo (Himalayan Gentian), Persicaria capitata (Pink Knotweed), White Himalayan Lungwort, Viburnum grandiflorum (Grand Viburnum), and many more. Typically, wildflowers bloom during early spring, from late March to April.

The region is known for birds such as the Himalayan snow cock, kala titar, chakor, magpie, thrush, paradise flycatcher, parakeet, and bulbuls.

The area is also home to a variety of mammals, including the Himalayan black bear. Other animals such as leopards, tigers, barking deer (kakar), and sambhar are occasionally seen. Marmots along with other rodents, are present.
