= 2020 Uttarakhand forest fires =

Forest fires in Uttarakhand, India

- Location: Uttarakhand

Statistics
- Burned area: Approximately 71 hectares (180 acres)

Impacts
- Deaths: 2
- Injuries: 1

The 2020 Uttarakhand forest fires started in late May, after several forest fires broke out in Srinagar of Pauri Garhwal district in Uttarakhand, India. As of 24 May 2020, 46 fires were reported covering around 71 hectares and 2 people have died.

== Overview ==
The state of Uttarakhand in north India is primarily mountainous, with the northern part of the state lying within the Greater Himalayas. According to the Government of India, as of 2014, 71% of the land of the state is forested. In total, the forest cover in Uttarakhand stretches to 24000 square kilometers, and extends through several protected regions, and biodiversity hotspots in the Himalayan region.

Naturally occurring forest fires are a regular summer occurrence in the state, and the State Government of Uttarakhand's prevention methods including collecting pine needles from forested areas, spreading awareness to limit man-made fires, and maintaining local alert systems. The usual season for such naturally occurring fires is between February and June, i.e. during the Indian summer months, when temperatures are high and there is limited to no rainfall.

== Cause and spread ==
In the last week of May 2020, Indian news media began reporting events of extensive and unprecedent rates of forest fires in the state of Uttarakhand. Initial reports suggested that the fires were primarily in the Kumaon region, but also confirmed that there were multiple, separate incidents of forest fires occurring throughout the state's forest cover. On 26 May 2020, the Times of India reported that there had been 46 incidents of forest fire in the state, resulting in a loss of 51.34 hectares (0.5134 km^{2}) of forest cover.

In October 2020, forest officials reported continued incidents of forest fires, which were stated to be 'untimely' for that time of the year. Forest officials described these fires as being caused by an unseasonable heatwave and period of dry weather.

== Damage ==
It led to a large damage to plants, animals along with destruction of large amount of land .

== Response ==
Initial reports of forest fires in Uttarakhand in May were met with denials by the State Government. The Uttarakhand State Department's Conservator, Dr Parag Madhukar, stated that visuals of forest fires being circulated in the media were fake. Another Forest Department official, on 26 May 2020, described the spread of the fires in 2020 as a "record low" for the region. On 27 May 2020, Jai Raj the Principal Chief Conservator of Forests for the Uttarakhand Forest Department stated that fake images circulating on social media had produced misleading beliefs in the spread of the fires, as these indicated crown fires, whereas forest fires in Uttarakhand were primarily limited to the ground level. On 28 May 2020, Uttarakhand Chief Minister Trivendra Singh Rawat stated that he had instructed the Uttarakhand Police to register First Information Reports against any person spreading rumors about forest fires in the state.

== Impact ==
Due to forest fire in Uttarakhand, forests in this region witnessed an increase in fire frequency. Studies have shown that biodiversity in fact increased during low fire frequency, but during high fire frequency biodiversity in the region decreased significantly. Other results show that species richness and density decreased in higher fire frequency classes, which could be due to a poor regeneration process.
