= Swargarohini =

Mountain massif in Uttarakhand, India

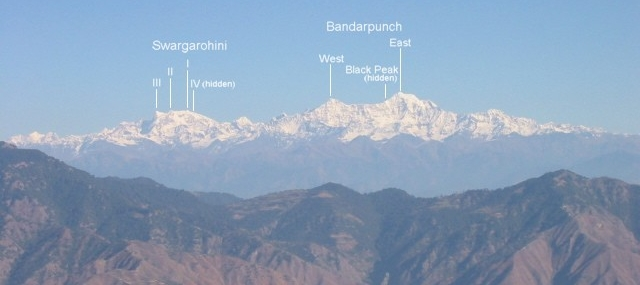
- Swargarohini and Bandarpunch massifs

Highest point
- Elevation: 6,252 m (20,512 ft)
- Coordinates: 31°05′04″N 78°30′58″E

Geography
- Location within Uttarakhand
- Location: Uttarakhand, India
- Parent range: Garhwal Himalaya

Climbing
- First ascent: 1990 by a team from the Nehru Institute of Mountaineering
- Easiest route: technical rock/snow/ice climb

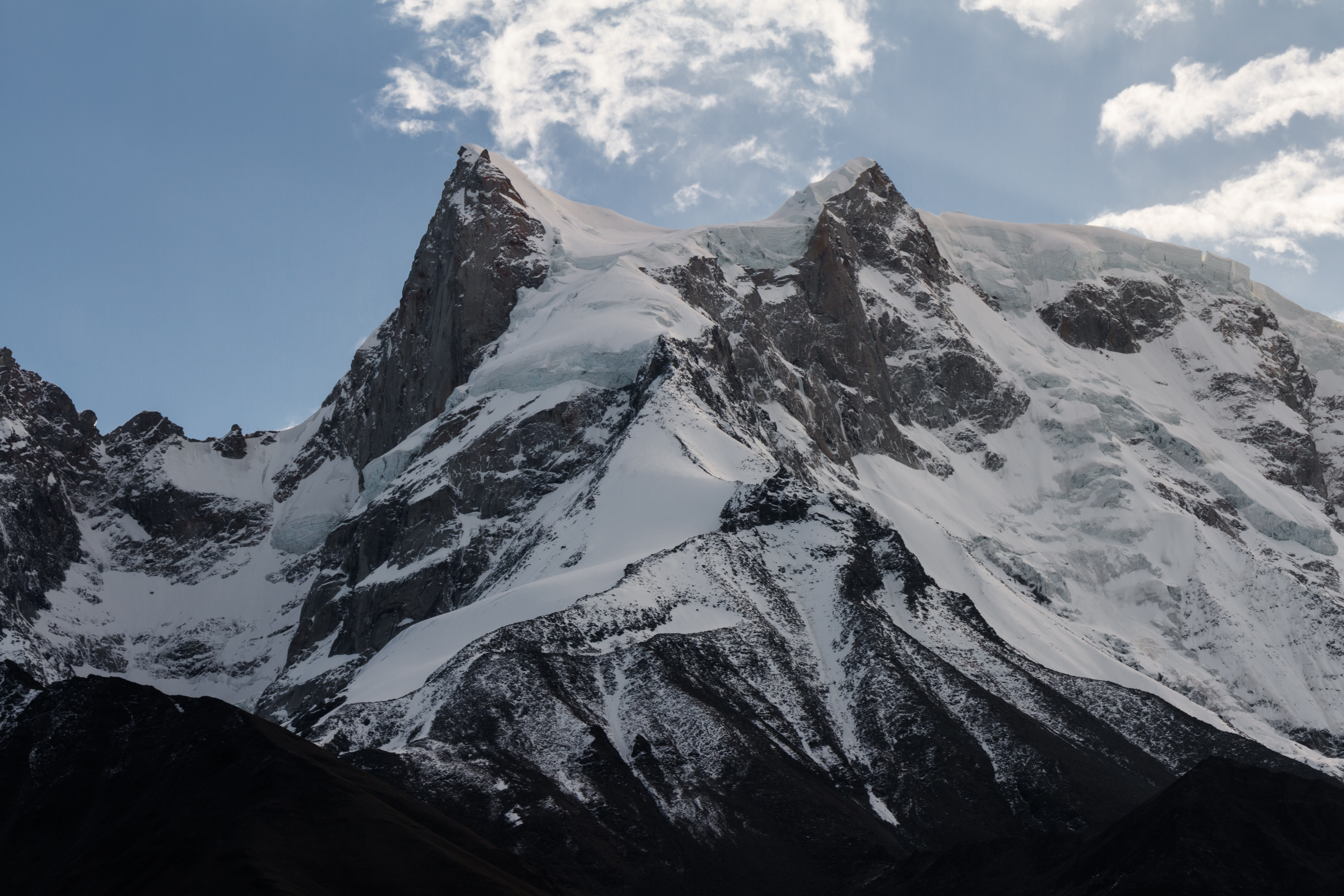
Swargrohini 3 (6209m) and Swargrohini 2 (Swargrohini East) (6247m) from Oodari Campsite en route Bali pass basecamp

Swargarohini (IAST: svargārohiṇī) is a mountain massif in the Saraswati (Bandarpunch) Range of the Garhwal Himalaya. It lies in the Uttarkashi District of the northern Indian state of Uttarakhand, west of the Gangotri group of peaks. It comprises four separate peaks, the main peak Swargarohini I is the subject of this article.

Swargarohini I, while not particularly high by Himalayan standards and not the highest in the Bandarpunch range, it is notable for its dramatic local relief. Since its north face drops 2,000 metres (6,560 ft) in less than 2 kilometres (1.2 mi) of horizontal distance, and its south face achieves the same drop in less than 3 kilometres (1.9 mi), the climb is steep and challenging. Swargarohini I has two summits, east and west. The Swargarohini I West is slightly higher than the Swargarohini I East summit, the later has an elevation of 6,247 m (20,495 ft). However, the first ascensionists of the Swargarohini I West peak claim that that summit is the higher of the two.

This snow-clad peak is the source of the Tons River and along with the Bandarpunch massif it acts as a watershed between the Yamuna and the Bhagirathi Rivers.

== History ==
Swargarohini derives its name from the legends associated with it from the Hindu epic Mahabharata. In the final section of the epic, the Pandavas give up kingdom and travel northwards in the hope of reaching heaven. The peaks are said to be the stairway to heaven that was followed by Pandavas, but only Yudhishthira, the eldest of the Pandavas, is able to reach heaven. According to the legends it is believed that this is the only way one can go to heaven without dying. But the legends further gets complicated as many claim that the Pandavas had taken a route from the present town of Badrinath in the eastern part of Garhwal, Uttarakhand, which is very far apart from the Swargarohini peaks in Sankari range of western Garhwal. AHead of Badrinath, Mana and onwards to Satopanth Lake, one can see the Swargarohini Glacier ( no relation to Swargarohini peaks ) and Yudhishthira and the dog ( form taken by Yamraj ) had climbed the Swargarohini glacier to the top and not the Swargarohini peak.

In the Upayana Parva of the Mahabharata, various hill tribes from the hill and mountain region of what is now Garhwal are mentioned as giving gifts to Yudhishthira during his Rajasuya yagna, including the Taganas, Kiratas and Kunindas. Parshurama killed his mother Renuka at Nakuri, 10 km from Uttarkashi town. Also, it is said the Pandavas, after leaving their kingdom to Parikshit, halted at Patangini before continuing to Swargarohini, where they died.

== Climbing history ==
By 1994, there had been fifteen documented attempts had been made to climb Swargarohini peak. On 25 October 1974, Charles Clarke (England); Dilsher Singh Virk, Peter Fuhrman and Bruce MacKinnon (Canada); and Mohan Singh and Rattan Singh (India) made the first ascent of Swargarohini I, ascending from its west side and reaching the west summit.

On 3 May 1990, the first successful ascent of the main Swargarohini summit was achieved by a team of instructors from the Jawahar Institute of Mountaineering and Winter Sports. They climbed from the Ruinsara Valley on the north side, via the eastern col connecting the peak to the rest of the range, and found challenging rock climbing to achieve the col, leading to easier snow slopes above. However, other sources claim that this ascent stopped (5 m (16 ft)) short of the summit due to the presence of an unstable cornice.

In 1991, an attempt to climb the south face of the peak was unsuccessful. On 7 June 1993, however, an expedition from Sweden made the first undisputed ascent of the peak from south face. The summit team comprised Birger Andrén, Ingela Nilsson, and Ake Nilsson. They ascended a rock ridge on the eastern side of the south face, leading to the easy east-southeast ridge.

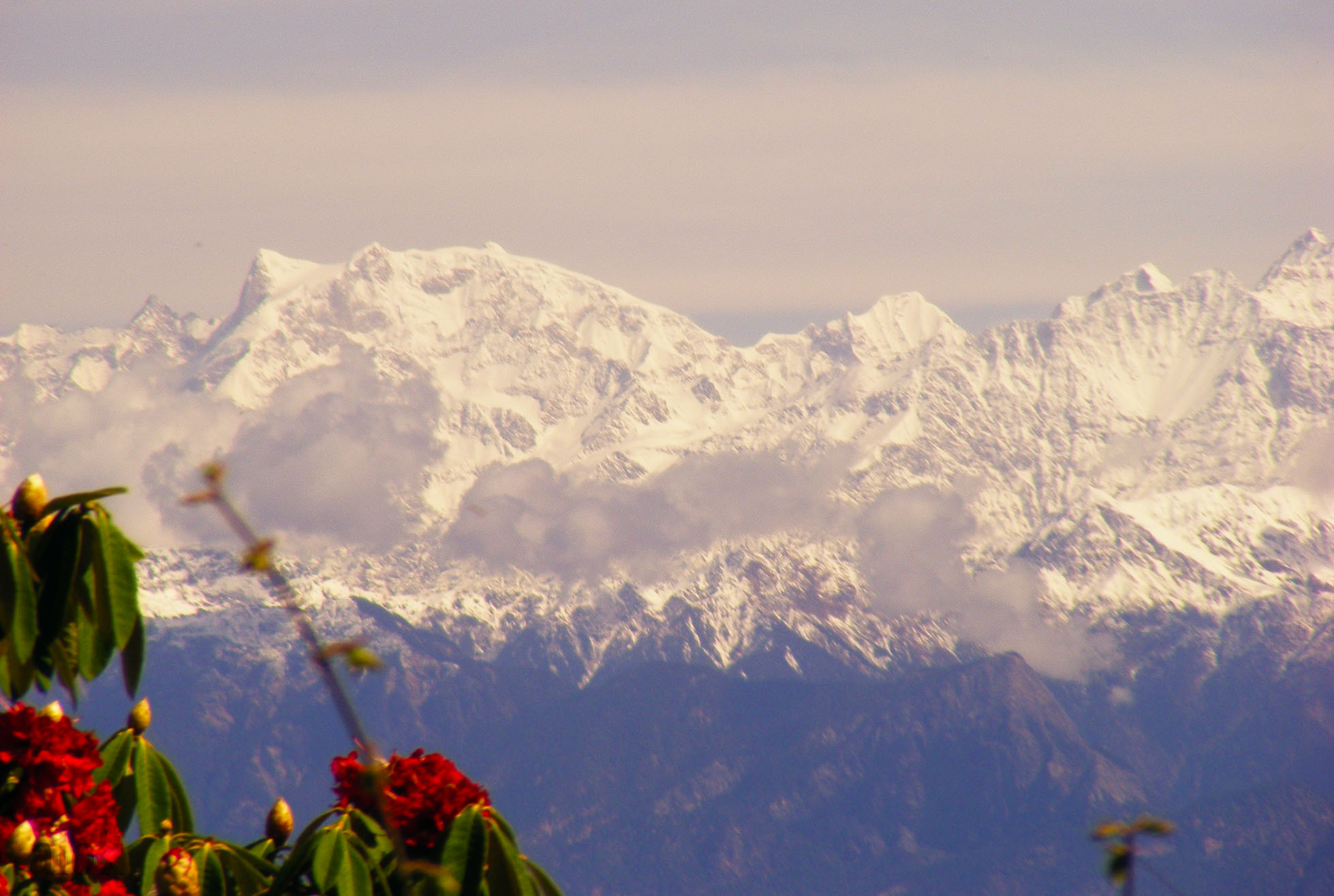

== See also ==
- Geography of Uttarakhand
- Geology of the Himalaya
- List of mountain peaks of Uttarakhand
