= Bedni Bugyal =

Himalayan meadow in Uttarakhand, India

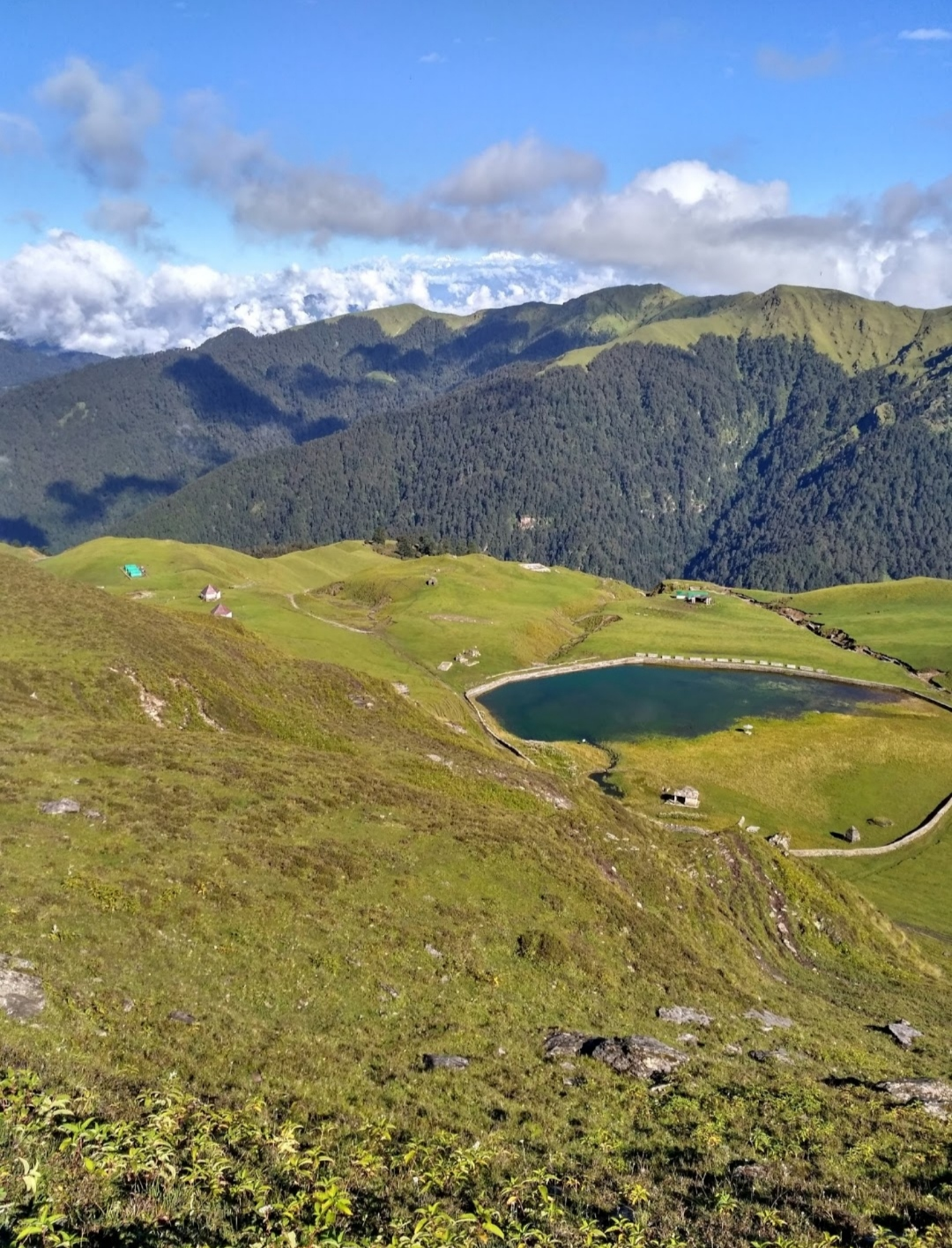
- Bedini Bugyal

Highest point
- Elevation: 3,354 m (11,004 ft)
- Coordinates: 30.206°N 79.663°E

Geography
- Location: Chamoli, Uttarakhand, India
- Parent range: Garhwal Himalaya

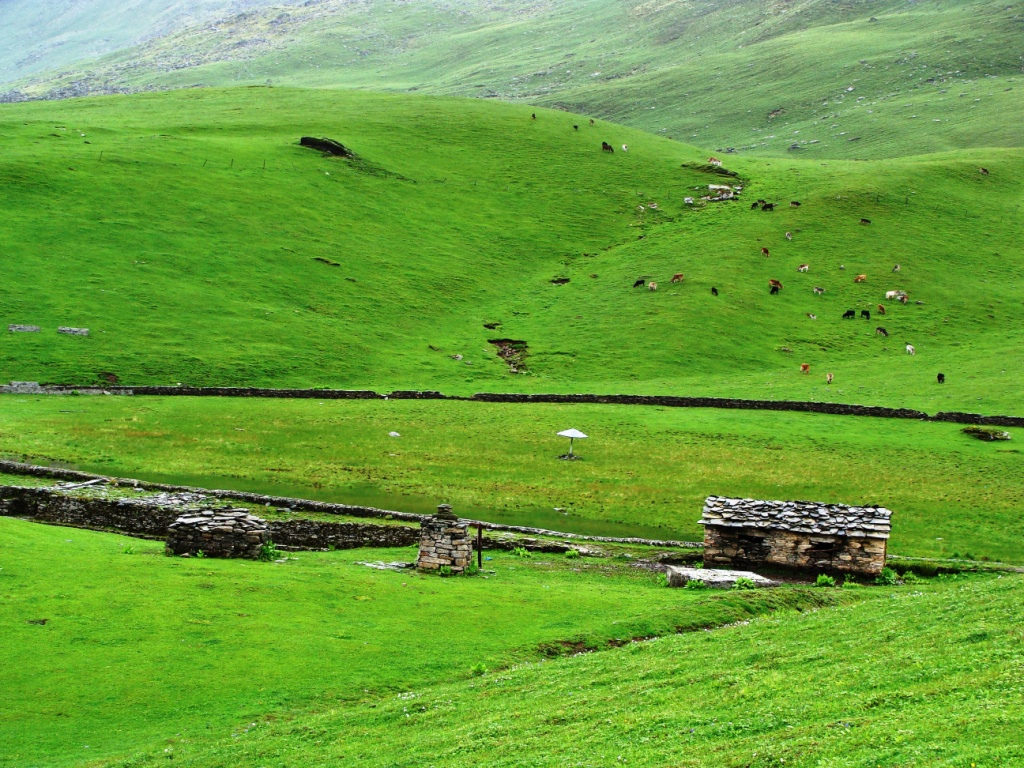
Bedni bugyal green

Aali Bedni Bugyal is a Himalayan Alpine meadow situated at an elevation of 3,354 metres (11,004 ft) in the Chamoli district of Uttarakhand state of India. Bedni Bugyal falls on the way to Roopkund near Wan village. Trisul and Nanda Ghunti are clearly visible from here. This lush green meadow is adorned with blooms in a wide range of varieties. There is a small lake named Vaitarani (Bedni Kund) situated amidst the meadow. The rich flora of the area includes 'Brahm Kamal' or Saussurea obvallata.

== Cultural & Religious Significance ==
Bedni Bugyal is an important stop on the famous Nanda Devi Raj Jat. It comes just before the last stop, Homkund, a sacred pond near Roopkund. The mysterious glacial lake of Roopkund is near Bedni Bugyal and is about 12 km away. One of the most revered places in Bedni Bugyal is Bedni Kund, which is a holy lake also known as Baitarni Kund. Near this pond, there is an ancient temple dedicated to Goddess Nanda Devi, a small temple of local deity Latu and other small carved shrines. Every year, a smaller pilgrimage of Nanda Devi Raj Jat concludes at the temples near Bedni Kund, while the grand twelve-yearly pilgrimage continues towards Homkund.

During the pilgrimage, Bedni Kund becomes the center of important rituals. Devotees offer Pindas to their ancestors here. Many believe that taking a dip in this holy lake purifies the soul and brings God's blessings. A grand fair is held around the lake during the pilgrimage, where priests and devotees pray, sing hymns, and offer flowers and food to the deities.

== Accessibility ==
Getting to Bedni Bugyal requires a hike of about 20 km (12.4 mi) from the village of Lohajung. A shorter but steeper route to Bedni Kund starts from Wan village, which is accessible from Lohajung village via a motorable road of about 15 km. Starting from Lohajung, the trail crosses the small Neel Ganga River and passes through Didna village and Aali Bugyal. To reach the nearest locations of Wan or Lohajung, Rishikesh is the closest city, accessible only by road (about 250 km). From Rishikesh, the route passes through Karnprayag, Tharali, and Deval before finally reaching Lohajung. The nearest airport to Lohajung is Jolly Grant Airport in Dehradun, and the nearest railway station is Yog Nagari Rishikesh Railway Station (YNRK).

== Conservation ==
Bedni Bugyal is classified as a high-altitude Himalayan region, and according to folklore, plucking flowers, singing songs, playing musical instruments like the flute, shouting, dancing, and engaging in disrespectful behavior are prohibited here. According to local beliefs, the Himalayan highlands are the abode of deities, who are thought to be sensitive to human actions. It is possible that these restrictions were made to maintain the sanctity of these holy places, conservation of wildlife system and to avoid natural disasters like avalanches, heavy snowfall, etc. However, scientific explanations do not support prohibitions affecting the risk of heavy snowfall, avalanches, and other natural disasters. Coincidental timing (such as someone shouting before an avalanche) might have strengthened this belief as scientific evidence over time.

Bedni Bugyal is under the reserve forest. The Allahabad High Court (1997) ruled that Bedni Bugyal is a fragile ecosystem meant for wildlife and must remain undisturbed. It ordered the removal of tourist camps, citing environmental harm from plastic waste. The court emphasized sustainable tourism to preserve the meadow’s natural balance. In August 2018, the Uttarakhand High Court recognized the ecological significance of high-altitude meadows, known as bugyals, and implemented measures to protect them. The court banned overnight stays in these areas, citing threats to their fragile ecosystems, and ordered the removal of permanent structures, including fiber huts constructed for tourists.
