= Dayara Bugyal =

Bugyal (Himalayan Alpine Meadow) in Uttarakhand, India

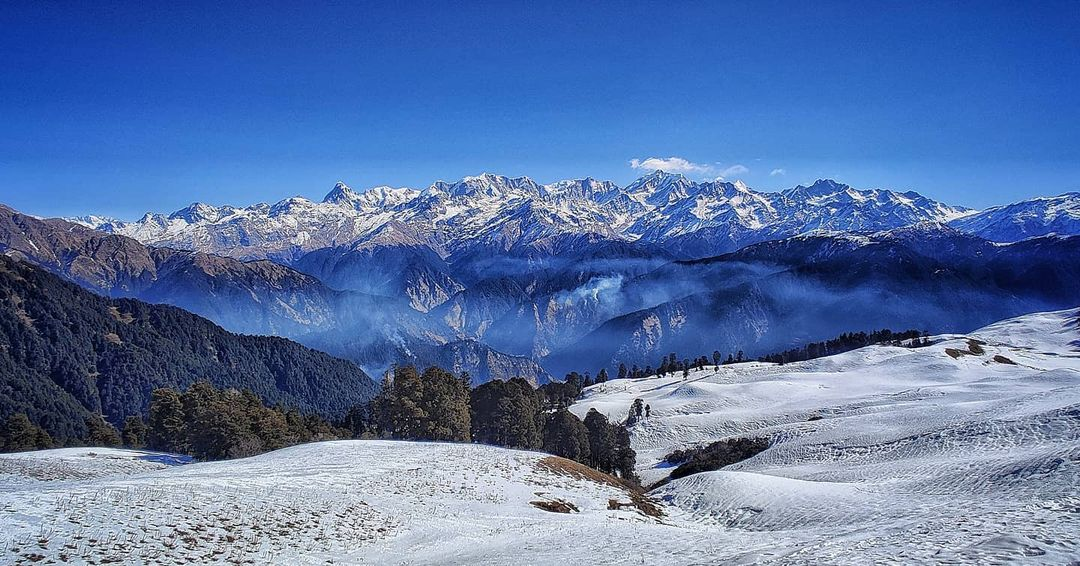
- Dayara Bugyal

Highest point
- Elevation: 3,639 m (11,939 ft)
- Coordinates: 30.8383656°N 78.5550349°E

Geography
- Location: Uttarkashi district, Uttarakhand, India
- Parent range: Garhwal Himalaya

Dayara Bugyal is a high altitude pastureland in the Uttarkashi district of Uttarakhand, India, and it covers an area of approximately 3.38 square kilometres. The grassland stretches from an elevation of around 2,600 meters to 3,500 meters. It is situated close to the villages of Raithal and Barsu, approximately 40 kilometers from Uttarkashi town. The meadow is preserved as part of a conservation initiative by the Uttarakhand Forest Department to protect alpine meadows.

In spring, there is contrast of greenery of the grasslands and red and pink rhododendrons. During the summer months, local shepherds bring their cattle to graze in the meadow and remain there until the winter season.In winter, the landscape is covered in snow, and shepherds return to the Himalayan foothills to graze their livestock. The place remains accessible year-round, even during the monsoon season. Views of the Garhwal Himalayas, including Mt. Bandarpunch, Srikantha, Jaonli, Draupadi ka Danda (DKD) and several lesser-known mountains, can be seen from Dayara Bugyal.

== Cultural Facts ==
Dayara Bugyal is known not only for its beautiful meadow but also for its rich culture.

- Jeetu Bagdwal: The interesting story of Jeetu Bagdwal, famous in the whole of Uttarakhand, revolves around this Bugyal.
- Butter Holi Festival: The unique tradition of Butter Holi festival is a part of Dayara Bugyal. This festival is celebrated every year on the auspicious occasion of Sankranti on the 1st Pravishte/Gate of the month of August (Sanskrit: भाद्रपद). This festival is organized by the villagers of Raithal. It is mainly dedicated to Lord Krishna, which is why butter is used in abundance.

== Gallery ==
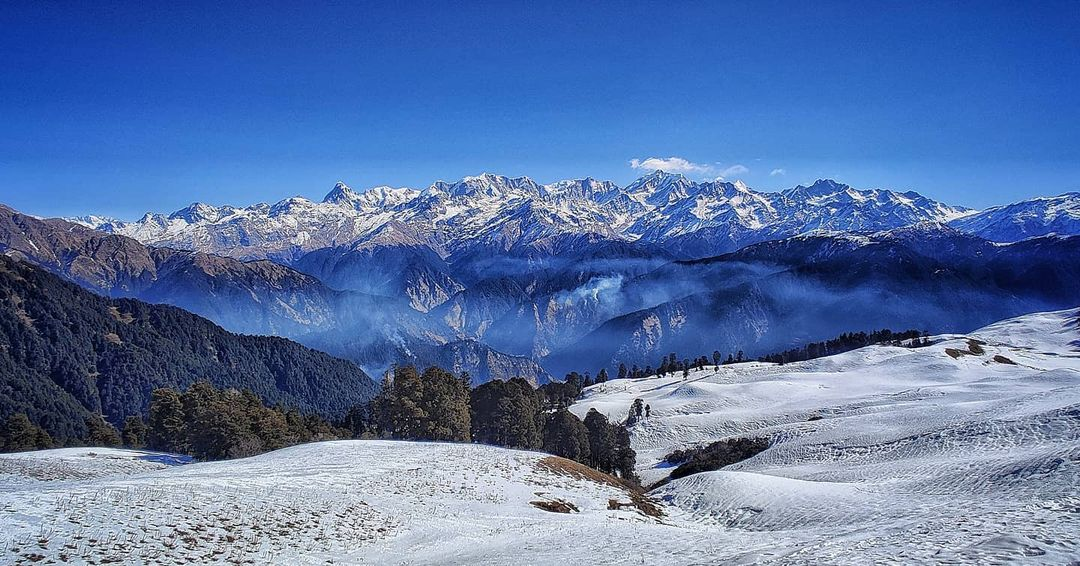
Dayara Bugyal

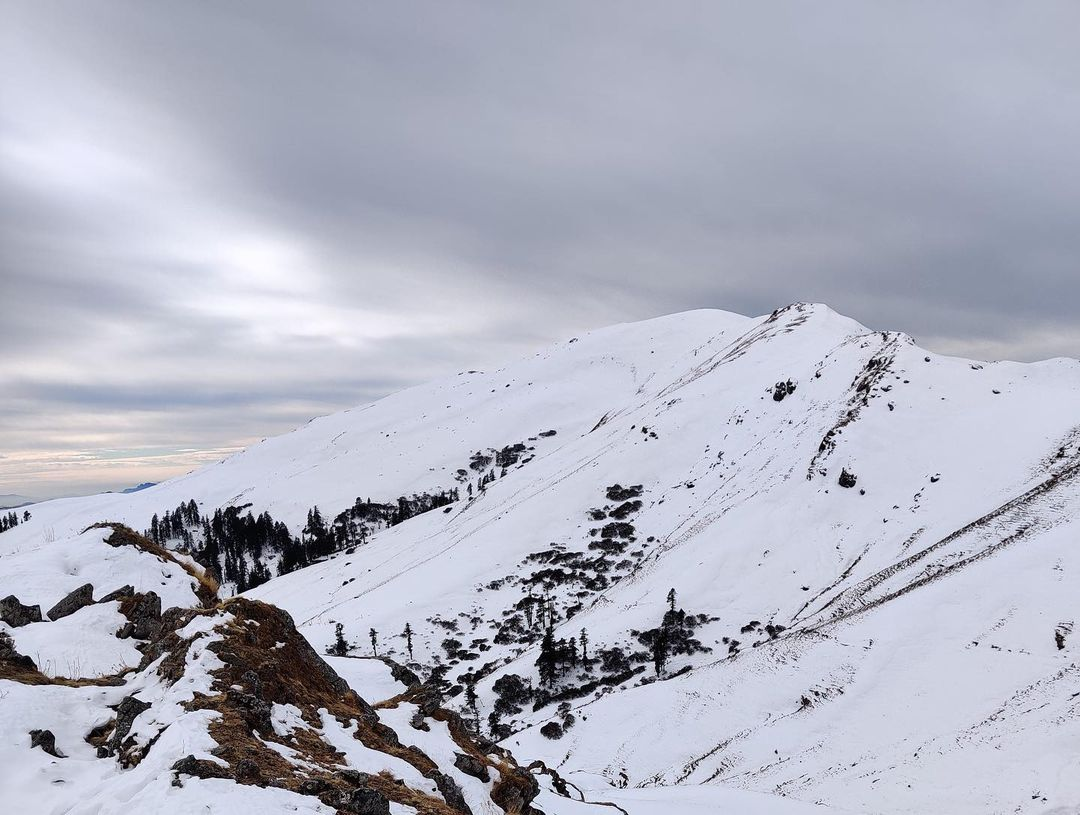
The summit

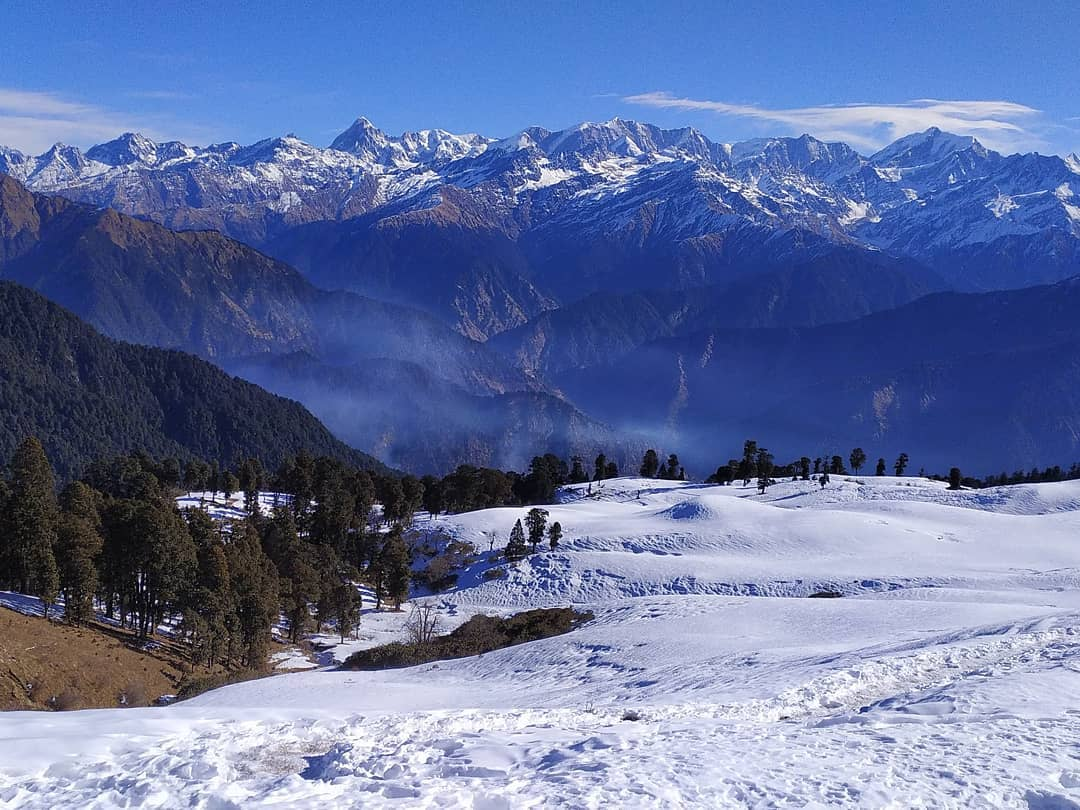
Dayara Bugyal Grasslands covered with snow
