= List of airports in Uttarakhand =

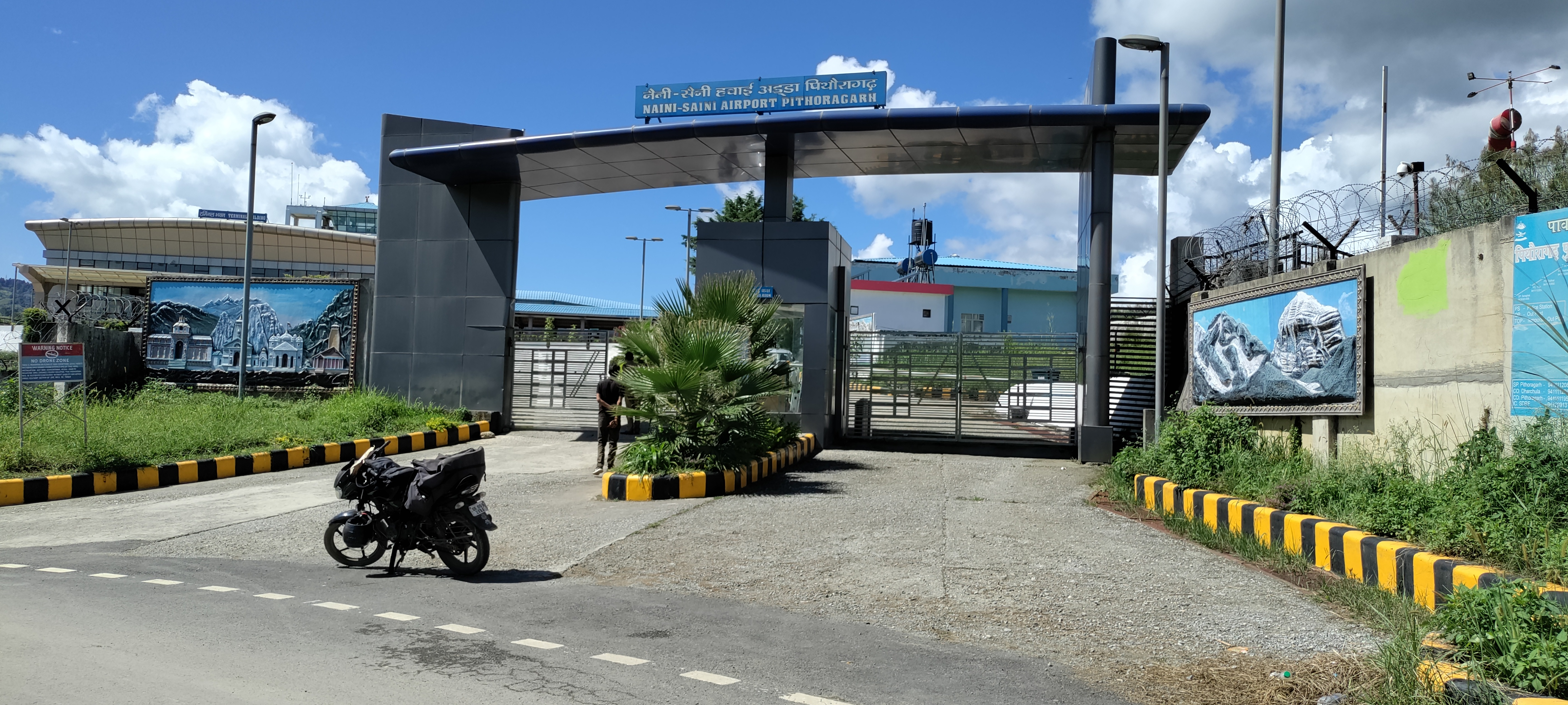
Naini–Saini Airport

Uttarakhand has three main airports, a few airstrips and a couple of proposed airstrips for military and emergency purposes. The Dehradun Airport in Dehradun, Pantnagar Airport in Pantnagar, and Naini–Saini Airport in Pithoragarh are operated by the Airports Authority of India. Three airstrips, Chaukhutia Airport, Gauchar Airport and Chinyalisaur Airport are proposed for expansion in the future under UDAN scheme.

Recently, a new terminal was constructed at Dehradun Airport. The new terminal was inaugurated in October 2021. In 2020, Uttarakhand's then Chief Minister Trivendra Singh Rawat had announced that the Pantnagar Airport will be expanded to become Uttarakhand's first international airport.

== List ==
The list includes the airports in Uttarakhand with their respective ICAO and IATA codes.

- Dual use= Civilian and military use.

List of airports in Uttarakhand
Sl. No.	District (Location)	Airport name	ICAO	IATA	Operator	Category	Role
1	Almora district (Chaukhutia)	Chaukhutia Airport	—	—	Government of Uttarakhand	Proposed	Commercial
2	Dehradun district (Dehradun)	Dehradun Airport	VIDN	DED	Airports Authority of India	Domestic	Commercial
3	Chamoli district (Gauchar)	Gauchar Airport	—	—	Ministry of Defence	Dual use	Commercial
4	Pithoragarh district (Gunji)	Gunji Airport	—	—	Government of Uttarakhand	Proposed	Commercial
5	Pithoragarh district (Pithoragarh)	Naini–Saini Airport	VIDF	NNS	Airports Authority of India	Dual use Domestic	Commercial
6	Udham Singh Nagar district (Pantnagar)	Pantnagar Airport	VIPT	PGH	Airports Authority of India	Domestic	Commercial
7	Uttarkashi district (Chinyalisaur)	Chinyalisaur Airport	VI82	—	Ministry of Defence	Dual use	Commercial

== See also ==
- List of airports in India
- Transport in Uttarakhand
- Railway in Himachal, Jammu Kashmir and Ladakh
- Geostrategic border rail lines of India
- Tourism in Uttarakhand
