= Gauchar =

- Town
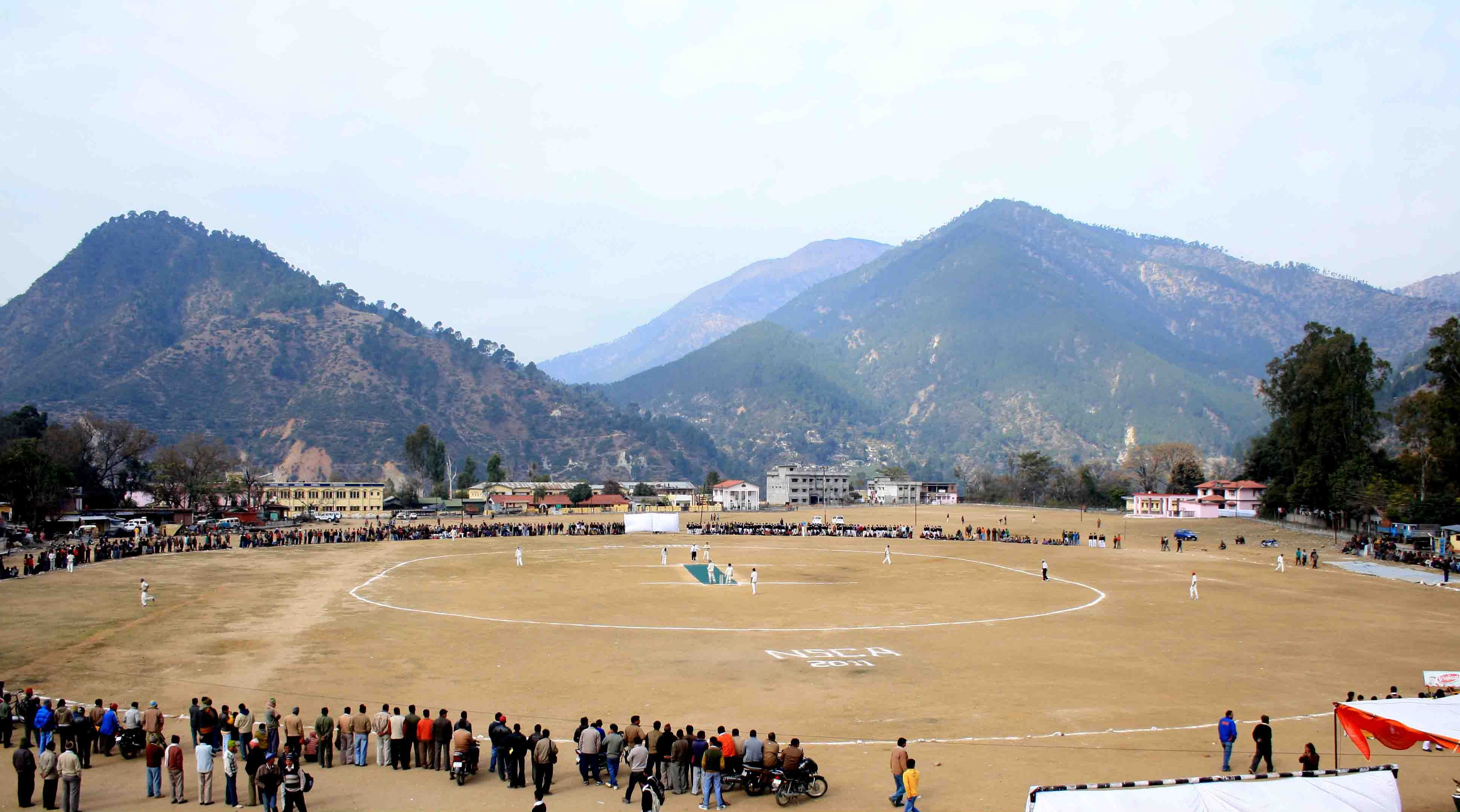
- Gauchar's Historical Ground

- Location in Uttarakhand, India Gauchar (India)
- Coordinates: 30.28°N 79.15°E
- Country: India
- State: Uttarakhand
- District: Chamoli

Population (2011)
  - Total: 7,303

Languages
  - Official: Hindi
  - Regional: Garhwali
- Time zone: UTC+5:30 (IST)
- PIN: 246429
- Vehicle registration: UK 11
- Website: uk.gov.in

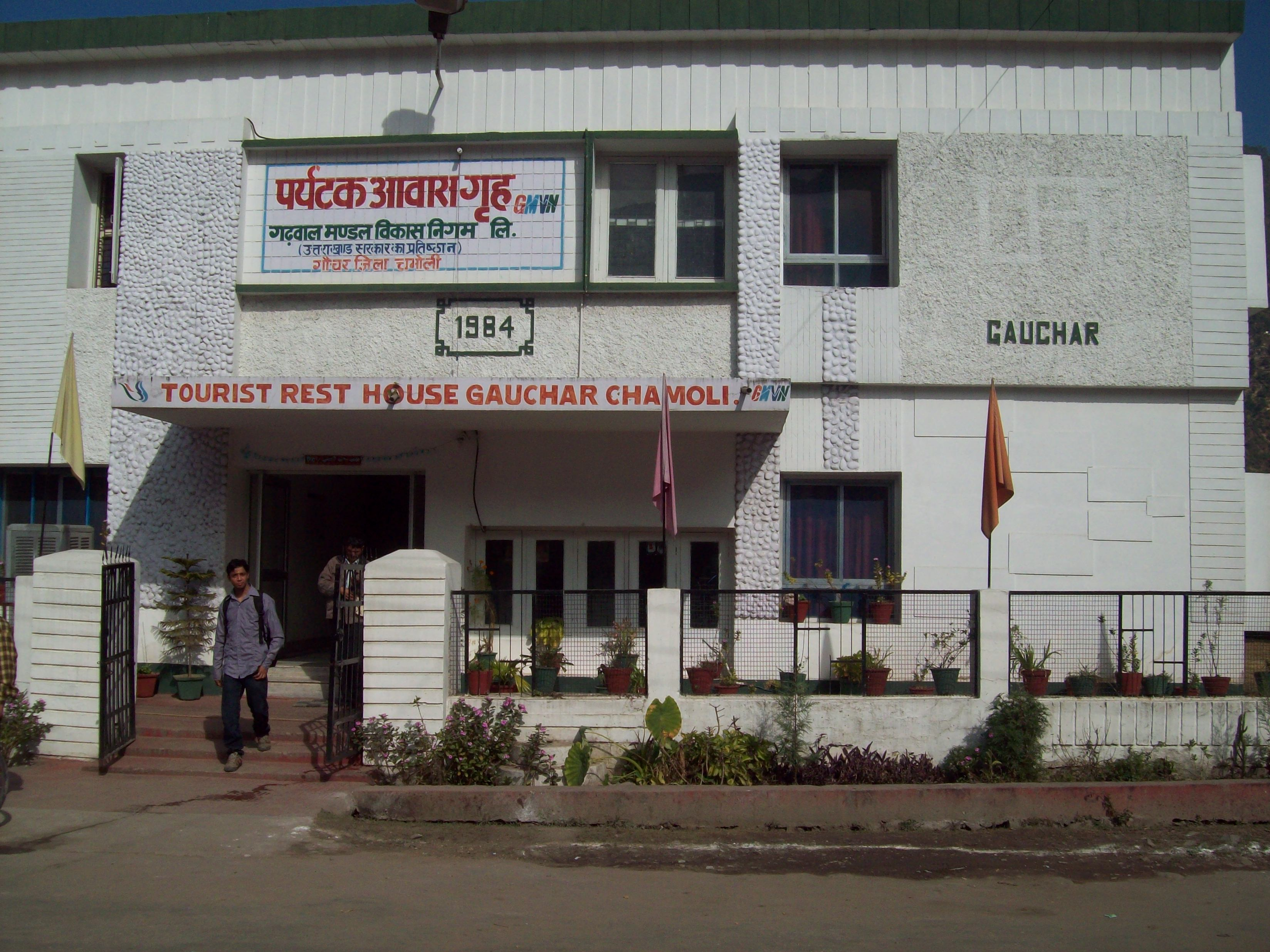
Gauchar Tourist Rest House

Gauchar (Garhwali: Gòchàr ) is a hill town located in Karnaprayag tehsil subdistrict within Chamoli district of Uttarakhand state in India. Gauchar is situated on the left bank of river Alaknanda and is en route to the celebrated holy destination of Badrinath. Situated at an altitude of 800 metres (2,620 ft) above the sea level, Gauchar is surrounded by seven mountains. The town is well known for its historic trade fair and airstrip. It is also known for its work to curb the loss of lives in the 2013 floods of Uttarakhand. Gauchar has flat relief in the otherwise rugged mountanious terrain of Chamoli.

== Geography ==
Gauchar is located at 30.28°N 79.15°E.

== History ==
Nature has endowed Gauchar with a large flat area, one of the largest such open spaces in the mountainous areas of Uttarakhand and this field has played a major role in its history. This field has served as an airstrip and played host to several dignitaries in the past. It has also been the venue of one of the largest trade fairs in the area. This flat land was the property of the Panwar kings of Garhwal and it was donated by them to the Badrinath Temple at some point in history. It still belongs to the Badrinath Temple and as such is not supposed to be used for agriculture or any other purpose. (Gauchar's new airstrip has come up on agricultural land as a result and also because a much larger area was needed for the strip and the administrative buildings.)

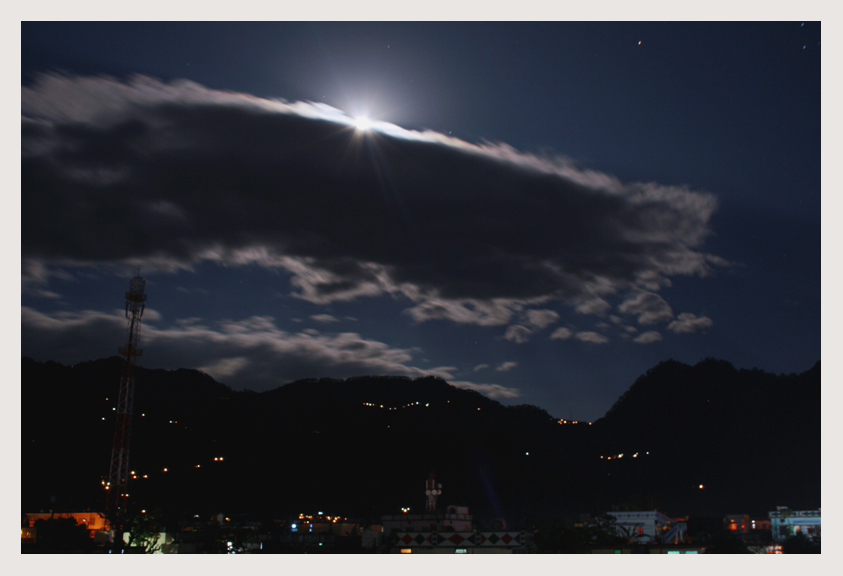
Gauchar Town at night

Gauchar first attained recognition in the 1920s when Lady Willingdon, wife of the then Viceroy of India landed here by air. Then, in 1938, Pandit Jawaharlal Nehru along with his sister Vijaya Lakshmi Pandit also came here by air on the way to a personal visit to Badrinath. At that time cow dung used to be burnt on the field to gauge the direction of air currents.

Since 1943, Gauchar has played host to one of the largest trade fairs in Uttarakhand. The Bhotias of Chamoli District, residing in the border regions of Garhwal Himalayas, are well known for their traditional expertise in making a range of woollen garments and materials, besides processing and colouring of wool. Before 1962, there was trans-border trade between India and former Tibet, and the import of wool was the major source of income for the Bhotia's woollens-based, indigenous cottage industry. But after 1962, trade was stopped due to conflicts between China and India. The Gauchar Mela served as huge market for the Bhotias to sell their ware including woollen products, precious jewels and heeng (asafoetida), and to buy good for daily necessity such as cloth and salt to carry back with them. This fair was not merely a local fair, but people travelled here from as far as Bijnaur and Kotdwar to participate in the brisk trade.

At a macro level, approximately 1000 AD to 1803, Gauchar – in common with the rest of Garhwal – was ruled by the Pal dynasty which later came to be known as the Shah dynasty. In 1803, taking advantage of the devastating earthquake that killed one-third of the region's population, the Gorkhas advanced towards Garhwal. Pradyuman Shah was the king at that time, and he lost his life and kingdom in the ensuing battle. In common with the rest of Garhwal, Gauchar came under Gorkha rule from 1803 to 1815. In 1815, the British who merged the eastern part of Alaknanda and Mandakini along with the capital Srinagar into British Garhwal. Initially, this area was administered from Dehradun and Saharanpur. However, later the British established a new district in this area and named it Pauri. Today's Chamoli – and Gauchar – was a tehsil of Pauri. On 24 February 1960, Tehsil Chamoli was upgraded to a new district in independent India's state of Uttar Pradesh. Gauchar became a Nagar Panchayat in 1994.

=== Gauchar Mela ===
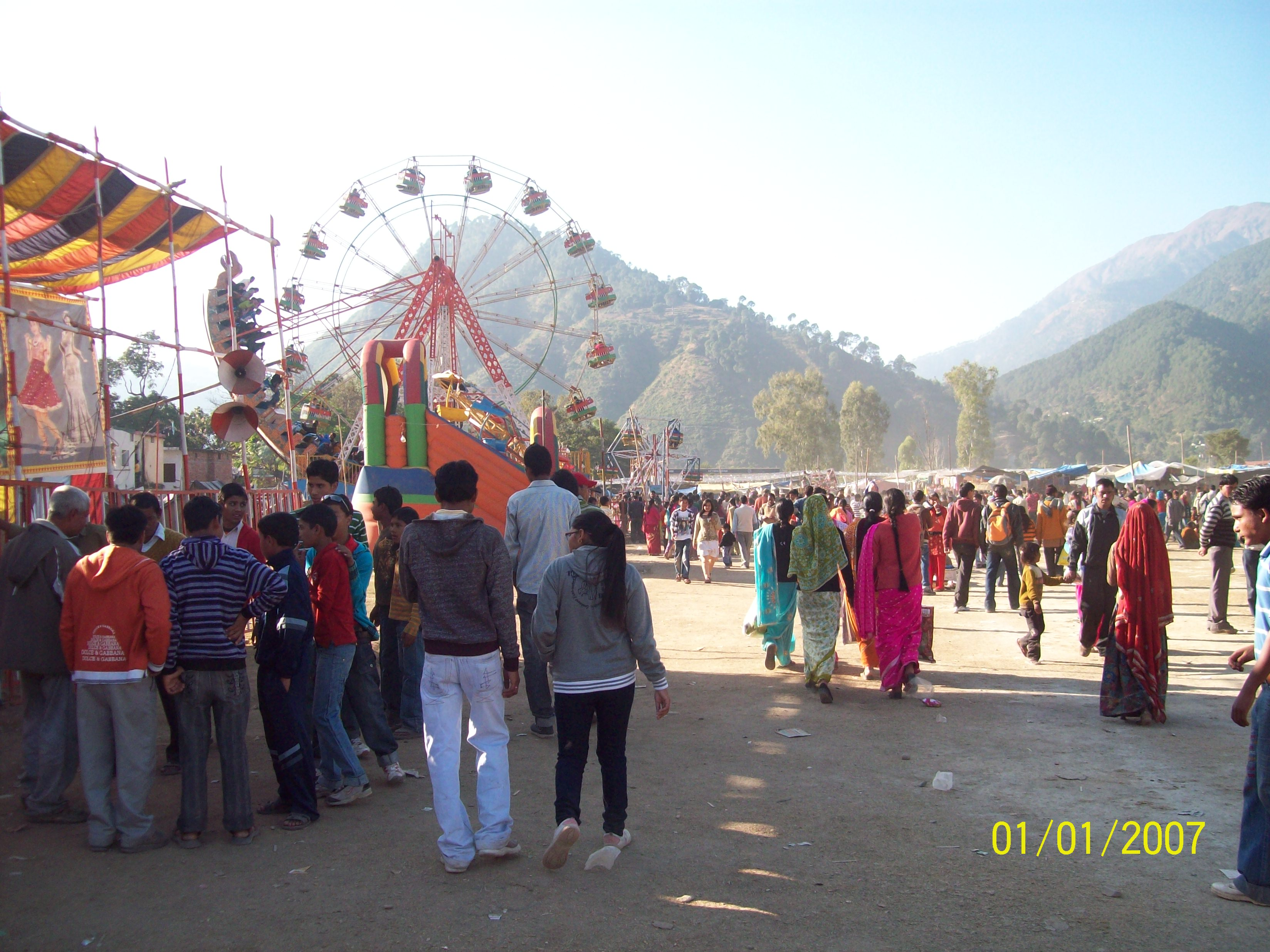
Gauchar Mela of Uttarakhand

Gauchar Mela of Uttarakhand is a great attraction for the local people and the traders and merchants from every corner of the state. Held every year on 14 November, Uttrakhand's Gaucher mela is fundamentally an industrial and traditional fair. It is attended widely by tourists and inhabitants (villagers people mostly) of the state alike. This fair hold two kinds of themes, in day time sports and evening time cultural programs by schools and state level artist. These are major attraction of Gauchar mela at Uttarakhand. Gauchar Mela in Uttarakhand was first organized in 1943 and has since taken place every year on the same dates. Trade between India and Tibet was open at that time. On this side, the trade was largely carried out by the Bhotias, who inhabit the frontiers of Chamoli Garhwal, bordering Tibet. But these high-altitude regions were covered with snow throughout winter, and the inhabitants used to migrate to lower altitudes for six months. The Gauchar Mela at Uttarakhand helped the Bhotias to sell their woolen handicrafts and buy the raw materials for the next summer trade across the borders. It was not only a local fair; people from across north India, especially, Uttar Pradesh, attended it. After India's independence, Gauchar Mela is being organized by the government as a developmental, industrial, and cultural fair. It is considered one of the major fairs in the region for promotion of trade and culture. All the state government departments participate in this annual event, which is a platform to showcase modern agricultural methods.

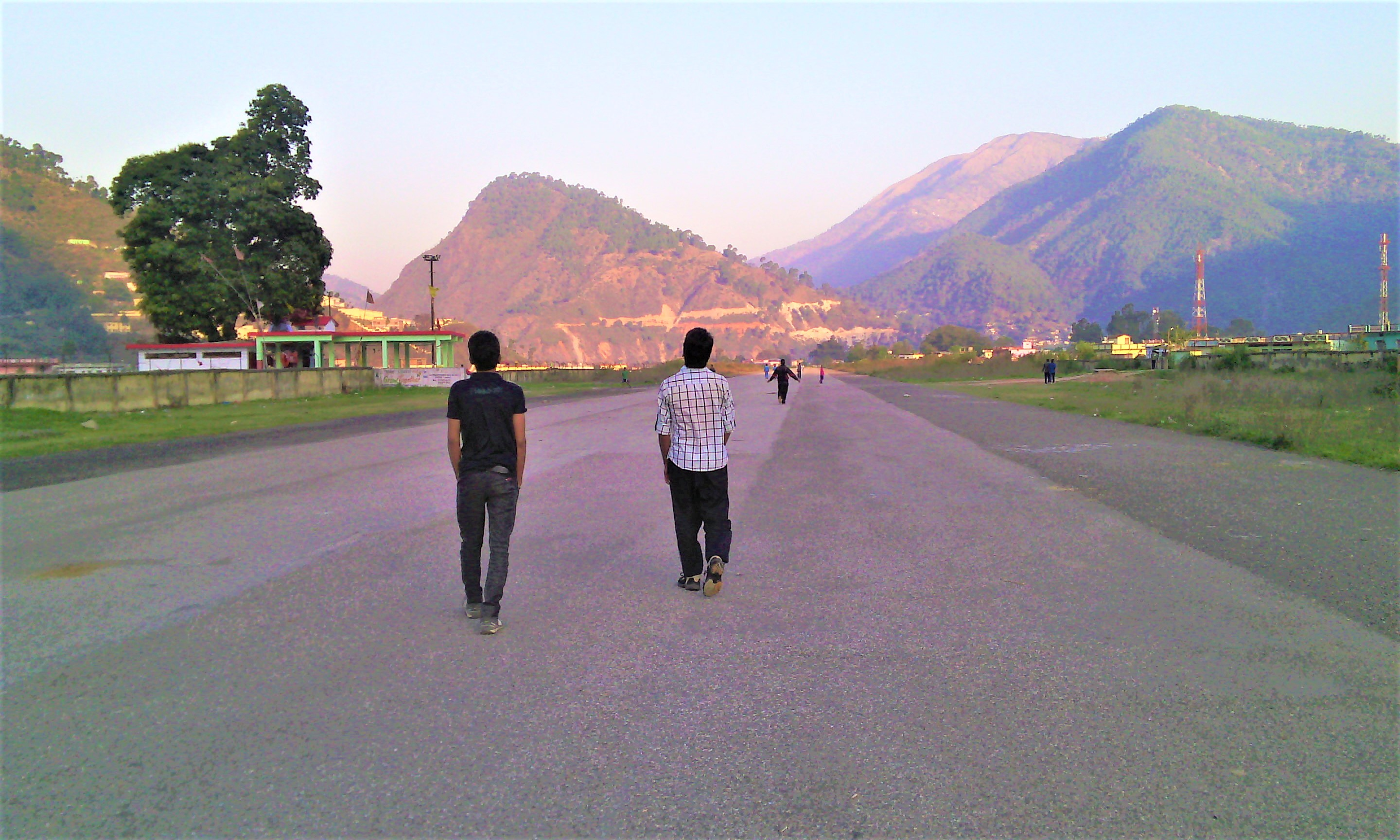
Gauchar Airport morning view

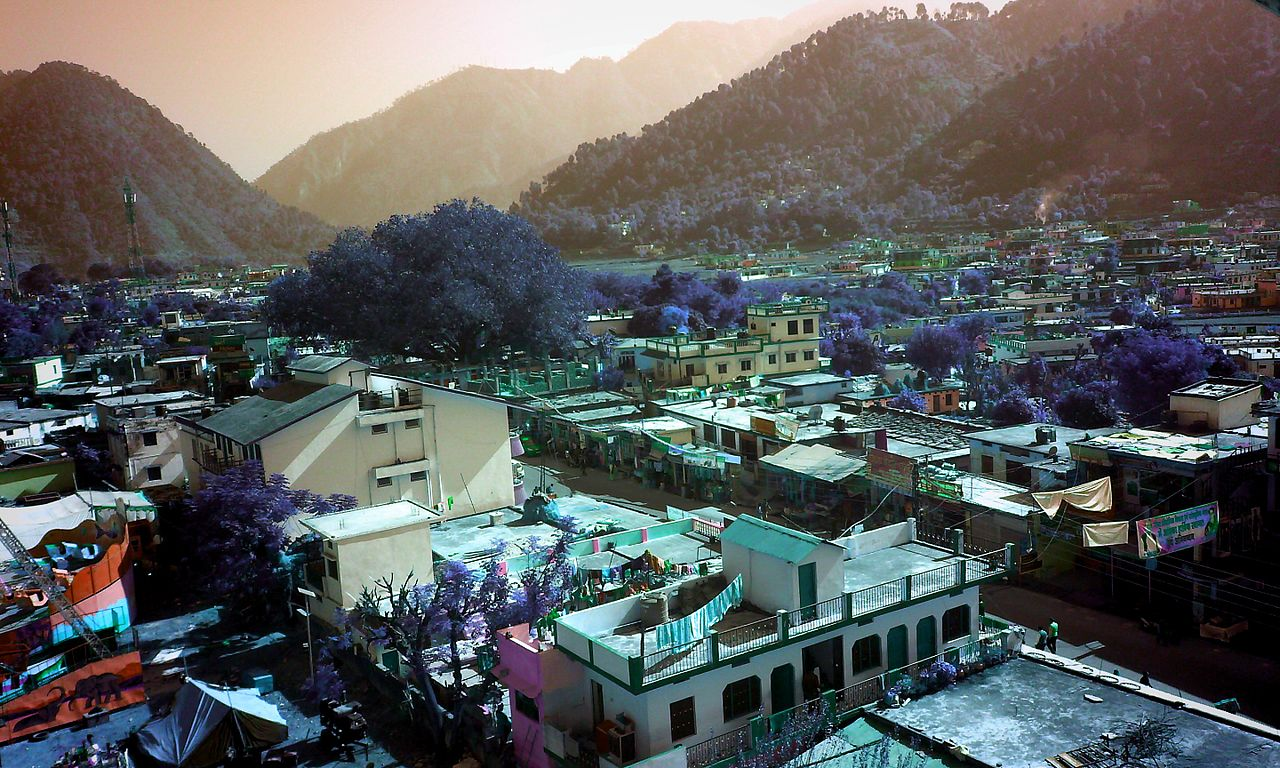
Gauchar Town During Gauchar Mela

== Demographics ==
As of 2011 India census, Gauchar had a population of 7303. Males constitute 58% of the population and females 42%. Gauchar has an average literacy rate of 81%, higher than the national average of 59.5%: male literacy is 85%, and female literacy is 76%. In Gauchar, 12% of the population is under 6 years of age.

== Transport ==
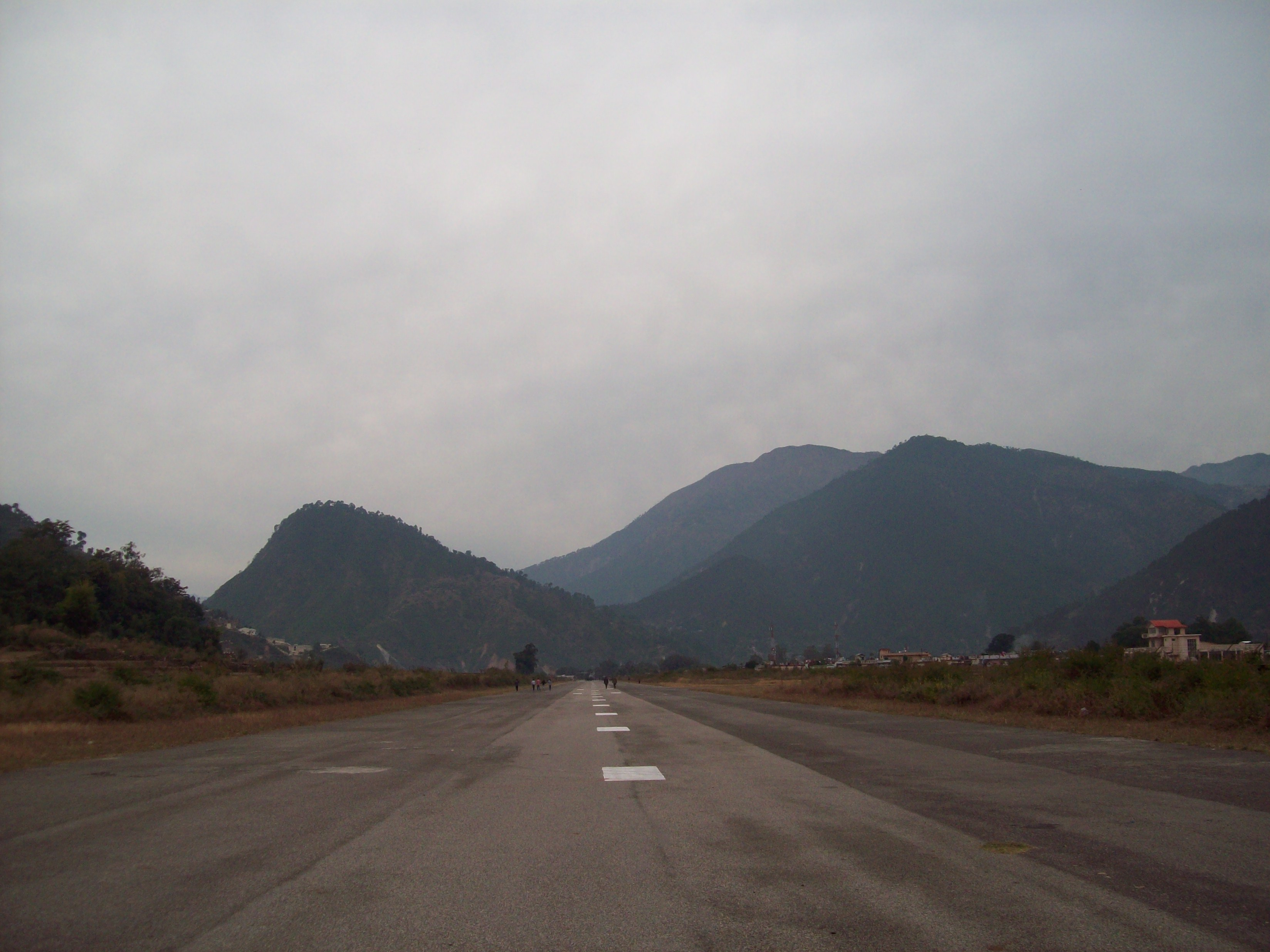
Gauchar Airstrip

By road, Gauchar is connected with Haridwar and Rishikesh by NH 58 that passes through the town. The nearest railhead is Rishikesh (235 km) and nearest airport is Dehradun Airport.

=== Gauchar Airport ===
It is located on the banks of River Alaknanda in the hills of Himalayas. It is very important airport during emergencies. Because of its location on one of the largest pieces of flatland in the mountainous region of Uttarakhand, a 4,000 ft airstrip was constructed at Gauchar in 1998–2000 and later upgraded. Gauchar Airport was a vital staging area for rescue and relief efforts following the disastrous 2013 North India floods which ravaged in Uttarakhand in June 2013. From February 8, 2020 the government has started a helicopter service from Dehradun to Gauchar and a return flight for the same under the UDAN scheme of the Government of India which will help people living in the hills of Garhwal region to the capital city of Uttarakhand.

As of October 2024, it was reported that the IAF and MoD was in an advanced stage of talks with the State Government to take over or operate from 3 civilian airports, including the Gauchar, Pithoragarh Airport and Dharasu Airports. The IAF has plans to establish an airstrip in the Spiti region as well. All the airstrips are capable and have demonstrated to handle operations of the C-130J special operations aircraft.
