= Naini–Saini Airport =

Domestic airport in Pithoragarh, Uttarakhand, India

Pithoragarh Airport
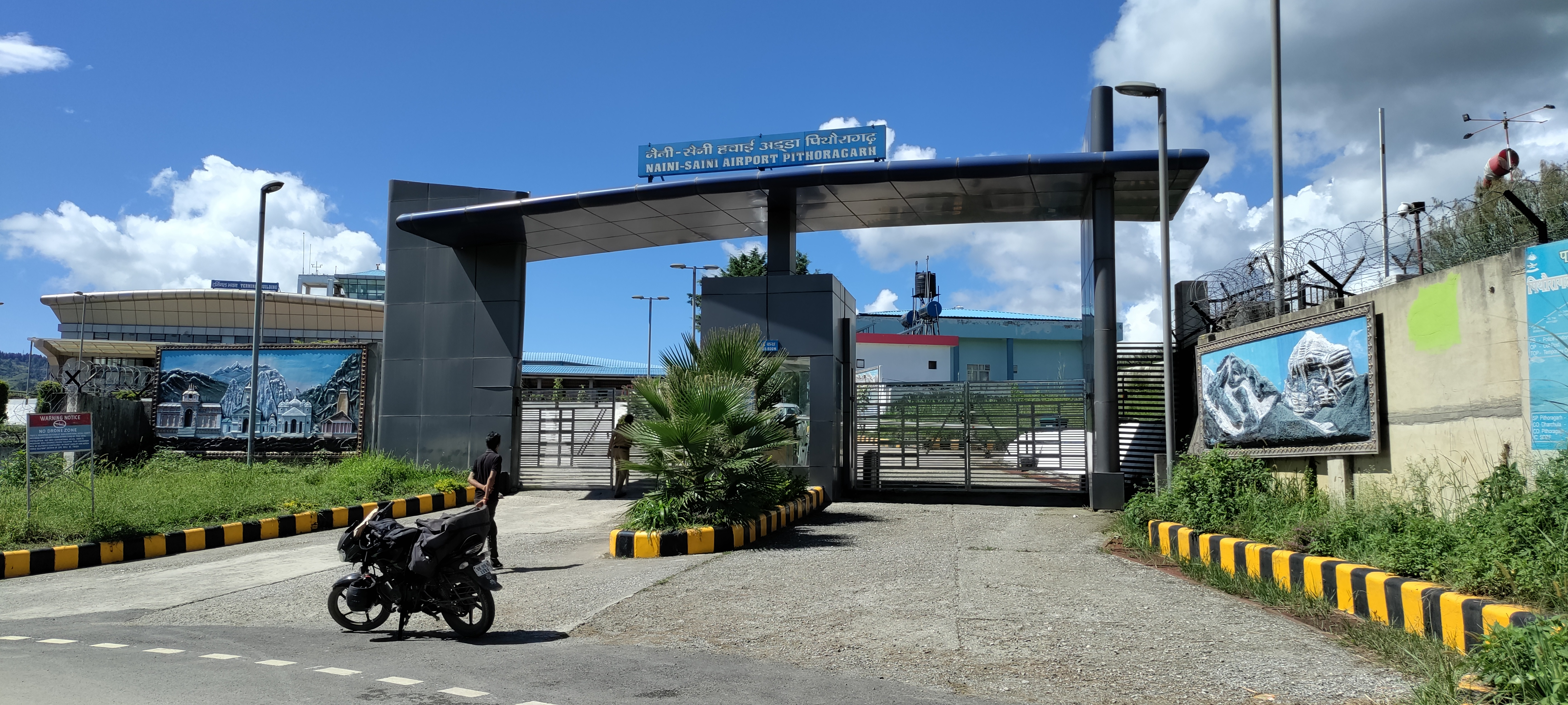
- IATA: NNS; ICAO: VIPG

Summary
- Airport type: Public
- Owner: Airports Authority of India
- Operator: Airports Authority of India
- Serves: Pithoragarh
- Location: Naini-Saini, Pithoragarh, Uttarakhand, India
- Built: 1991; 35 years ago
- Coordinates: 29°35′29.20″N 80°14′24.40″E

Map
- Location of airport in Uttarakhand NNS (India)

Runways
Direction	Length		Surface
Direction	m	ft	Surface
14/32	1,600	5,250	Asphalt

Statistics (April 2025 - March 2026)
- Passengers: 17,701 (▲8.8%)
- Aircraft movements: 3,552 (▲43.3%)
- Cargo tonnage: —
- Source: AAI

Naini–Saini Airport (IATA: NNS, ICAO: VIPG), also known as Pithoragarh Airport, is a domestic airport serving Pithoragarh and Kumaon division in Uttarakhand, India. It is located at Naini-Saini, 4.5 km (2.8 mi) north-east from the city centre. The airport has been designated to be developed as a greenfield airport under the government's UDAN Scheme.

== History ==
The airport was constructed in 1991 for administrative use and planned for the operations of Dornier 228 type aircraft. To facilitate development, connectivity, socio-economic growth, and tourism in the state, the Government of Uttarakhand has upgraded it to category "2C" airport under Visual flight rules (VFR) conditions, by extending the runway and building a passenger terminal to handle commercial operations. In the coming years, the airport will be expanded further to handle larger aircraft and more passengers, with night landing facilities for aircraft to facilitate operations at night. Since the opening of the airport, it was used only for private and government purposes, until when in January 2019, it was included in the government's UDAN Scheme, and began to handle commercial operations and flights for the first time, to Dehradun, Ghaziabad and Pantnagar, operated with 9 seater aircraft by the regional carrier, Heritage Aviation. However, due to multiple technical issues that persisted and occurred several times since February 2019, flight operations did not continue adequately after November 2019, and were indefinitely suspended in February 2020 due to the COVID-19 pandemic. In August 2022, regular helicopter services from the airport to Dehradun and Pantnagar were started by Pawan Hans.

In February 2023, the Union Cabinet approved the Indian Air Force's move to take over the airport operations. This was also approved by the Government of Uttarakhand. Post transfer, both military and commercial flights will be operated from the airstrip.

After a gap of about four years, on 30 January 2024, flight operations were resumed by FlyBig to Dehradun from the airport, using a 19-seater Viking DHC-6-400 Twin Otter aircraft. The airline will later restart the flights to Ghaziabad and Pantnagar.

As of October 2024, it was reported that the IAF and MoD were in an advanced stage of talks with the State Government to take over or operate from 3 civilian airports, including the Gauchar, Pithoragarh Airport and Dharasu Airports. The IAF has plans to establish an airstrip in the Spiti region as well. All the airstrips are capable and have been demonstrated to handle operations of the C-130J special operations aircraft.

== Structure & Expansion Plan ==
The airport has a 1,600 m (5,200 ft)-long and 30 m (98 ft)-wide runway, oriented 14/32, which has taken its present length after extending it two times from 1,097 m (3,599 ft) and 1,508 m (4,948 ft), and is capable of handling ATR 72 type aircraft, an apron for parking of two ATR-72 type aircraft, a passenger terminal covering an area of 2,440 m^{2} (26,300 sq ft), capable of serving up to 300,000 passengers per annum, an Air Traffic Control (ATC) tower, a fire station and a technical block. It is linked to Pithoragarh through an access road. In the coming years, the airport will be expanded further, by extending the runway and building a new passenger terminal to cater to more passengers and air traffic. The state govt has also cleared a Rs 450 crore plan to expand Pithoragarh Airport. An MoU has been signed with Airport Authority of India (AAI) for Pithoragarh's airport management.

== Airlines and Helicopter destinations ==
Airlines	Destinations
Alliance Air	Delhi, Dehradun
Heritage Aviation -HeliService	Almora, Haldwani , Munsyari,

== See also ==
- List of airports in Uttarakhand
- List of airports in India
- Kumaon division
- Garhwal division
- Tourism in Uttarakhand
- UDAN Scheme
