= Santala devi temple =

Coordinates: 30°24′06″N 78°01′50″E

Santala Devi Temple

Religion
- Affiliation: Hinduism
- District: Dehradun

Location
- State: Uttarakhand

Santala Devi Temple is a hindu temple in Punkal Gaon, Galajwari, Dehradun, Uttarakhand. The temple is dedicated to Goddess Santala Devi, who is believed to be a form of Goddess Durga.The temple is 2083 metres above sea level. the temple is 15 km from main city Dehradun and 37 km from Jolly Grant Airport.

== History ==
According to legend, Princess Santala, the daughter of a Nepalese king, fled to Dehradun with her brother Santaur Singh to escape a Mughal king who wished to marry her. When the Mughal forces found and attacked them, the siblings fought bravely but soon realized they could not win. They prayed for divine help, and a bright light appeared, transforming them into stone idols while blinding the Mughal soldiers. The temple was later built at this site, which became a well-known landmark in Dehradun.
