= National Highway 58 (India, old numbering) =

Old numbering of road in India

National Highway 58

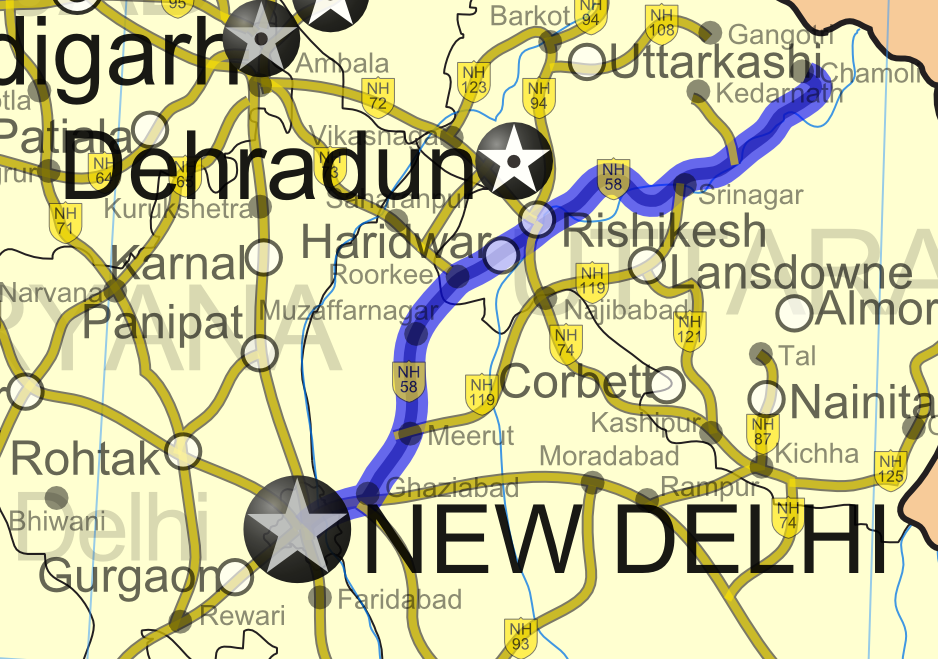
- Road map of India with NH 58 highlighted in thick blue colour

Route information
- Length: 538 km (334 mi)

Major junctions
- South end: Ghaziabad, Uttar Pradesh
- North end: Mana Pass north of Badrinath, Uttarakhand

Location
- Country: India
- States: Uttar Pradesh: 165 km (103 mi); Uttarakhand: 373 km (232 mi)
- Primary destinations: Ghaziabad - Meerut - Muzaffarnagar - Roorkee - Haridwar - Rishikesh - Joshimath - Badrinath - Mana Pass

Highway system
- Roads in India; Expressways; National; State; Asian
← NH 57A	→ NH 59

This article is about the old number of Delhi-Meerut-Roorkee-Haridwar-Badrinath National Highway.

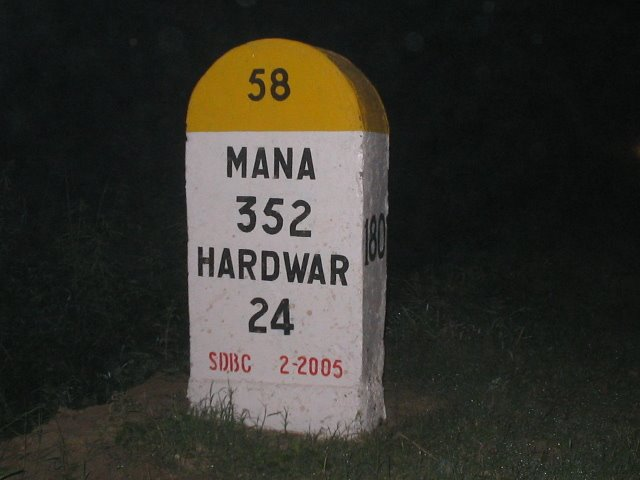
Milestone on old NH-58

National Highway 58 (NH 58) was a national highway in India before it was renumbered. It linked Ghaziabad in Uttar Pradesh near New Delhi with Badrinath and Mana Pass in Uttarakhand near Indo-Tibet border. The highway started from Mana village north of Badrinath temple and passed through Badrinath, Joshimath, Chamoli, Vishnuprayag, Nandaprayag, Karnaprayag, Rudraprayag, Srinagar, Devprayag, Rishikesh, Haridwar, Roorkee, Muzaffarnagar, Meerut and Modinagar and ended at Ghaziabad, a few km short of Delhi.

Of its total length of 538 km, NH 58 traversed 165 km in Uttar Pradesh and 373 km in Uttarakhand.

The highway was constructed and maintained by National Highways Authority of India from Delhi to Rishikesh and Border Roads Organisation (BRO) of Indian Army from Rishikesh, where the plains end and the mountains start, to its northernmost end. The highway bypasses Meerut city that was a big bottleneck. Bypasses have been constructed at Muzaffarnagar and Roorkee.

Various segments of NH 58 have got new numbers now and NH 58 does not exist as such. However, many persons continue to use the term NH 58 for the Delhi-Meerut-Haridwar highway.

== NH 58 broken into various NH numbers ==
With the National Highways Authority of India renumbering all national highways in India, various segments of NH 58 got new NH numbers. These are:

- NH 7 from Mana Pass at Indo-Tibet border to Rishikesh.
- NH 34 from Rishikesh to Haridwar.
- NH 334A from Haridwar to Laksar and Purkazi town in Muzaffarnagar district on Uttarakhand-U.P. border.
- National Highway 334 (India) from Purkazi to Meerut.
- National Highway 34 (India) from Meerut to Modinagar and Ghaziabad just short of Delhi.

The highway bypasses the towns and cities en route from Haridwar to Meerut.

== Importance of NH 58 (old number) ==
=== Religious ===
It is an important route for Hindu pilgrims as it connects the national capital New Delhi with religious pilgrim centres, Haridwar and Rishikesh in the plains of Uttarakhand, and then with the hill cities and temples of Uttarakhand. The most important pilgrimage circuit in Uttarakhand is called Chhota Char Dham (Four Pilgrimage Centres) comprising Yamunotri (where Yamuna river originates), Gangotri (where Ganga river originates), Kedarnath temple and Badrinath temple. The pilgrims visit Haridwar and Rishikesh in the plains the entire year but more so during the winter. The pilgrim season in the hills starts with melting of the snow at the end of April or in the beginning of May and continues until the onset of monsoon rains in late June. Buses and vehicles packed with pilgrims and tourists throng the highway during the summer months.

The highway is packed with pilgrims and tourists during pilgrimage season or during important festivals. When pilgrims bring holy water from Ganga river and carry it to their villages and homes walking on foot all the way during one fortnight, one lane of the highway is reserved for these pilgrims who walk on foot and vehicles have to use only one lane for about two weeks in a year.

Tens of millions of pilgrims attending the Kumbh Mela in January to March 2021 at Haridwar will use this highway extensively. More than 50 million devotees attended the last Kumbh Mela.

=== Strategic and military ===
The highway connects with the border with Tibet. It is built and maintained by Border Roads Organisation (BRO) of Indian Army from Rishikesh, where the plains end and the mountains start, to its northernmost end. Earlier it was built only up to Chamoli and has over the years gradually been extended to Joshimath, Badrinath and finally to Mana Pass near the border with Tibet. The army along with civilians living in Garhwal are its major user. CharDham yatra in summer is all thru this route.

== Development ==
As of December 2013, the Meerut to Muzaffarnagar stretch is 4-laned on toll basis including bypasses at Khatauli and Muzaffarnagar. The Muzaffarnagar to Haridwar stretch has been awarded for similar development with scheduled completion by February 2013, but has been delayed due to problems such as land acquisition, tree felling and inadequate mobilization by the Concessionaire. Also, a flyover at Mohan Nagar, a 4710 m long viaduct at Modinagar and a 1710 m long viaduct at Murad Nagar are proposed.

- February 2020: Roorkee bypass road construction work restarted, its expected to be completed by November 2020.
- February 2021: Roorkee bypass opens for traffic.

== See also ==
- Delhi–Meerut Expressway
- List of national highways in India
- National Highways Development Project
- Rishikesh–Karnaprayag line
