= National Highway 334A (India) =

National highway in India

National Highway 334A

Route information
- Length: 61.5 km (38.2 mi)

Major junctions
- South end: Purkazi
- North end: Haridwar

Location
- Country: India
- States: Uttarakhand, Uttar Pradesh

Highway system
- Roads in India; Expressways; National; State; Asian
← NH 334	→ NH 334B

National Highway 334A, commonly referred to as NH 334A is a national highway in India. It is a spur road of National Highway 334. NH-334A traverses the states of Uttarakhand and Uttar Pradesh in India.

== Route ==
Purkazi, Laksar, Haridwar.

== Junctions ==
NH 334 Terminal near Purquazi.

== See also ==
- List of national highways in India
- List of national highways in India by state
