= Suliwala Bagh =

Historical garden in India

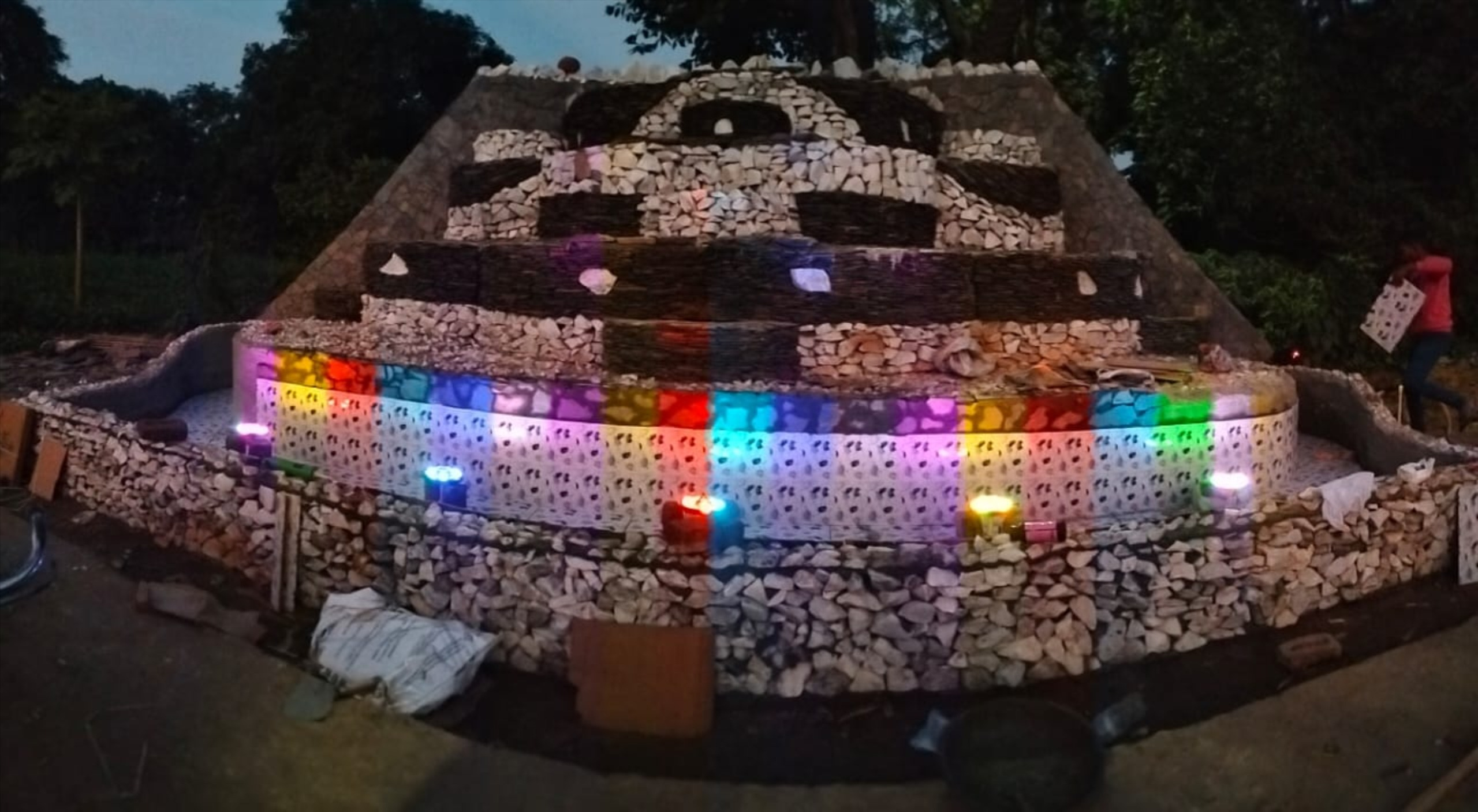
- Suliwala Bagh - Memorial Structure
- Interactive map of Suliwala Bagh
- 29.6631°N 77.8445°E
- Location: Purkazi, Muzaffarnagar, India

Site notes
- Elevation: 300m (1,000 ft.)

Suliwala Bagh (IPA: [suː.liːʋaːlaː baːɣ, baːɡ]) (also spelled as Suli Wala Bagh, Sooliwala Bagh or Sooli Wala Bagh) is a historical garden located in Purkazi Nagar Panchayat, Muzaffarnagar District, Uttar Pradesh, India.

Its history dates back to the Indian Rebellion of 1857 (also known as the "Sepoy Mutiny" or, in India, "The First War of Independence") which broke out between the Indian Freedom activists and the British Empire during which 500 Indian freedom fighters were hung at the site.

== History ==
Following the 1857 revolt in Meerut, the revolution spread in the neighboring regions including Muzaffarnagar. Agitated with the atrocities of British rule, the local insurgents killed the British collector at the time, Werfort on 29 May 1857.

In retaliation, the newly appointed Collector of Muzaffarnagar, Mr. Edward ordered the British army to suppress the uprising in the area. There, Major William ordered the hanging of 500 Indian rebels who had participated in the revolution. This incident led to the park being named as Suliwala Bagh (translation: Garden of Gallows).

== Current State ==
Despite having historical significance in India's first war of independence, this memorial site continues to be sidelined. The history of Suliwala Bagh is yet to be acknowledged in the official documents. Over the years, the local communities and a myriad of influential people have been demanding the heritage status for the Muzaffarnagar Park.

The Bhartiya Kisan Union Chief Rakesh Tikait has written to the prime minister of India Narendra Modi to demand Martyr's Memorial status (Shaheed Sthal) for the historical site. Purkazi Chairman Zaheer Farooqui has also demanded this status.

== Legacy ==
Much before the infamous and relatively more well-known Jallianwala Bagh Massacre in Amritsar, the Suliwala Bagh massacre took place 1857. The mass hanging was intended to create a sense of fear among people and prevent further dissent, but it became a symbol of martyrdom and resistance for the local population.
