= Chinyalisaur Airport =

Airport of Uttarakhand, India

- IATA: none; ICAO: VI82

Summary
- Airport type: Public
- Owner: Government of Uttarakhand
- Operator: Ministry of Defence
- Serves: Chinyalisaur, Uttarkashi
- Location: Chinyalisaur, Uttarakhand, India
- Elevation AMSL: 909 m (2,982 ft)
- Coordinates: 30°34′58″N 78°19′24″E

Map
- Location within Uttarakhand Location within India

Runways
Direction	Length		Surface
Direction	m	ft	Surface
16/34	1,001	3,285	concrete

Chinyalisaur Airport, also known as Maa Ganga Airport and Dharasu Airport or Bharkot Airport, is located in Chinyalisaur of Uttarkashi district in the Indian state of Uttarakhand. The airport is situated 35 kilometres away from Uttarkashi and 85 kilometers from New Tehri on the banks of the Bhagirathi River.

== Civil aviation usage ==
The airport was initially constructed to cater to the needs of tourist and pilgrim traffic to the region, but lay unused as air charter companies did not start operations to the area.

== Military usage as ALG ==
The Indian Air Force also uses the airport as an Advanced Landing Ground (ALG).

As of October 2024, it was reported that the IAF and MoD was in an advanced stage of talks with the State Government to take over or operate from 3 civilian airports, including the Gauchar, Pithoragarh Airport and Dharasu Airports. The IAF has plans to establish an airstrip in the Spiti region as well. All the airstrips are capable and have demonstrated to handle operations of the C-130J special operations aircraft.

== See also ==
Military bases

- List of ALGs
- List of Indian Air Force stations
- India-China military deployment on LAC

Borders

- Line of Actual Control (LAC)
- Borders of China
- Borders of India

Other related topics

- India-China Border Roads
- List of extreme points of India
- Defence Institute of High Altitude Research
