= Purkazi =

Purkazi Qazi Pur (Purquazi)
- Town
- Location in Uttar Pradesh, India Purkazi (India)
- Coordinates: 29°39′29″N 77°50′31″E
- Country: India
- State: Uttar Pradesh
- District: Muzaffarnagar

Government
  - Type: Nagar Panchayat
  - Body: Purkazi Nagar Panchayat
  - Chairman: Zaheer Farooqui (Adv.)
- Elevation: 300 m (980 ft)

Population (2011)
  - Total: 27,516

Languages
  - Official: Hindi
- Time zone: UTC+5:30 (IST)
- PIN: 251327
- Vehicle registration: UP 12
- Website: up.gov.in

Purkazi or Purquazi is a town and a nagar panchayat in Muzaffarnagar district in the Indian state of Uttar Pradesh. This town shares its border with the Haridwar district of Uttarakhand, serving as a connecting link between the two regions. Located in close proximity to the state border, Purkazi offers easy access to nearby towns and cities in both states.

== Demographics ==
As of 2011 India census, Purkazi has a population of 27,516 which includes 14,332 males and 13,184 females. Children comprise 4,575 of the total population of Purkazi. The Nagar panchayat has 13,244 illiterate people out of which 7,736 are males and 5,508 are females.

== Location ==
Purkazi is located on NH 58, Delhi-Dehradun highway, 56 km from the holy city of Ganges.

== Historical significance (Suliwala Bagh) ==
The Suliwala Bagh located in Purkazi is the witness to the mass murder of 500 freedom fighters after the first war of independence in 1857 when the English collector ordered them to be hanged for disobeying British government rule. The citizens of Purkazi are demanding Suliwala Bagh to be declared as a National ‘Shaheed Sthal’. Thousands of people participated in a Tiranga Yatra on 15 August 2018.

== Events ==
The Chairman of Purkazi, Advocate Zaheer Farooqui has been observing Shaheed Diwas (Martyr's Day) every year on 23 March since 2017 to commemorate the sacrifices of Indian freedom fighters.

Zaheer Farooqui also hosted the patriotic program "Ek Shaam Shaheedon Ke Naam" in Purkazi on 23 March 2019. On this occasion, tributes were paid to the freedom fighters and the martyrs of Pulwama. The relatives of Shaheed Bhagat Singh, Vir Abdul Hamid, and the families of CRPF personnel who died in the Pulwama Terror attack attended the event, among others.
