= Mussoorie Wildlife Sanctuary =

Wildlife sanctuary in Uttarakhand, India

Mussoorie Wildlife Sanctuary Benog Wildlife Sanctuary
- IUCN category IV (habitat/species management area)
- Location within Uttarakhand Location within India
- Interactive map of Mussoorie Wildlife Sanctuary; Benog Wildlife Sanctuary
- Nearest city: Mussoorie
- Coordinates: 30°27′55″N 78°0′45″E
- Area: 10.82 km^{2} (4.18 sq mi)
- Established: 2 September 1993

Mussoorie Wildlife Sanctuary also known as Benog Wildlife Sanctuary, is a protected area and wildlife sanctuary located about 11 km (6.8 mi) Mussoorie in the Dehradun district of the Indian state of Uttarakhand. It was declared as a protected area on 2 September 1993.

== Description ==
Located on the foothills of the Himalayas, the sanctuary covers an area of 10.82 km^{2} (4.18 sq mi) and forms a part of the Rajaji National Park.

The protected area consists of moist temperate forests with deodar and oak trees. Fauna found in the sanctuary include leopard, Indian elephant, Bengal tiger, lion-tailed macaque, Himalayan goat, and antelopes. Birds include mountain quail, red-breasted partridge, brahminy kite, and red-billed blue magpie amongst others.
