= National Highway 334 (India) =

National highway in India

National Highway 334
- Map of National Highway 334 in red

Route information
- Length: 207 km (129 mi)

Major junctions
- From: Haridwar chandi chowk
- To: Bulandshahr

Location
- Country: India
- States: Uttarakhand, Uttar Pradesh
- Primary destinations: Roorkee, Muzaffarnagar, Meerut, Hapur

Highway system
- Roads in India; Expressways; National; State; Asian
← NH 234	→ NH 334A

National Highway 334 (NH 334) is a National Highway in India.
