= Chinyalisaur =

Chinyalisaur Bishtpati
- Town
- Location in Uttarakhand, India Chinyalisaur (India)
- Coordinates: 30.583333°N 78.321025°E
- Country: India
- State: Uttarakhand
- District: Uttarkashi
- Named for: Chinyali village

Government
  - Type: Tehsil
  - Body: Nagar Palika Parishad
- Elevation: 909 m (2,982 ft)

Population (2011)
  - Total: 15,500

Languages
  - Official: Hindi
  - Regional: Garhwali
- Time zone: UTC+5:30 (IST)
- PIN: 249196
- Telephone code: 91-1371
- Vehicle registration: UK-10
- Website: uk.gov.in

Chinyalisaur is a small town and tehsil headquarters in the Uttarkashi district of the Indian state of Uttarakhand.

== Geography ==
Chinyalisaur is a semi-urban settlement. It is named after a nearby village called Chinyali. 'Saur' is the Garhrwali word for "plain" area. Chinyalisaur is located along the pilgrimage route to Gangotri. It is surrounded by small mountains and sits on the banks of the river Bhagirathi. The Chinyali Saur was the native land of Bisht Thakurs.The Bisht Thakurs are said to be settled here from almost 500 years from 1535. The Nagraja temple is the oldest temple here. The patti there had been named after the Mansabdars Bisht Thakurs as Bishtpati. This place was known for his long plain lands and farming.

It is around 70 kilometres from Chamba, 34 kilometers from Uttarkashi and 100 km from capital Dehradun.

The Arch Bridge, Shri Krishna Trilokhi Nath Nagraja Mandir, Balaji Mandir Dharashu, Ganga Beach, Trek To Nagraja Dhar, etc are locations to visit and enjoy with friends and family.

A lake formed by the Tehri power project covers some part of this town. The arch bridge over the lake is an attraction point.

Krishi Vigyan Kendra is located there.

== Education ==
The town has one intermediate college, one degree college, ITI, a polytechnic college and various private educational schools, One of the oldest government school is GIC Chinyalisaur, One of the famous private school among there is MARY MATA SCHOOL (Convent of Jesus and Mary). It is a developing educational hub. GIC Inter College completed 50 years of operation in 2015.

== Demographics ==
The population of the city is about 50,000. The majority of the population speak Garhwali.

== Economy ==
The main occupation is agriculture, government, and business. The headquarters of Maneri Bhali Hydroelectric Project are there.

== Transport ==
The town is served by Chinyalisaur Airport which is used by the Indian Air Force as an Advanced Landing Ground.
