= Tourism in Uttarakhand =

Uttarakhand is a state in the northern part of India. It is often referred to as the "Devbhoomi" (literally 'Land of the Gods') due to its religious significance and numerous Hindu temples and pilgrimage sites found throughout the state. As a result, religious tourism forms a major portion of the tourism in the state. Uttarakhand is known for the natural environment of the Himalayas. 2019 Tourist Arrivals Domestic – 40,000,000 per/year and Foreigner – 150,000 per year. Tourism business in Uttarakhand generated ₹ 23,000 crores during 2013–14. Uttarakhand recorded robust visitor numbers in 2025 with tourist footfalls estimated at close to six crores, encompassing both domestic and inbound travel. While the Char Dham Yatra remained the cornerstone of tourism activity, sustained movement was also evident across leisure destinations, adventure hubs and emerging experiential circuits signalling a broader consumption of tourism products.

== Chota Char Dham ==
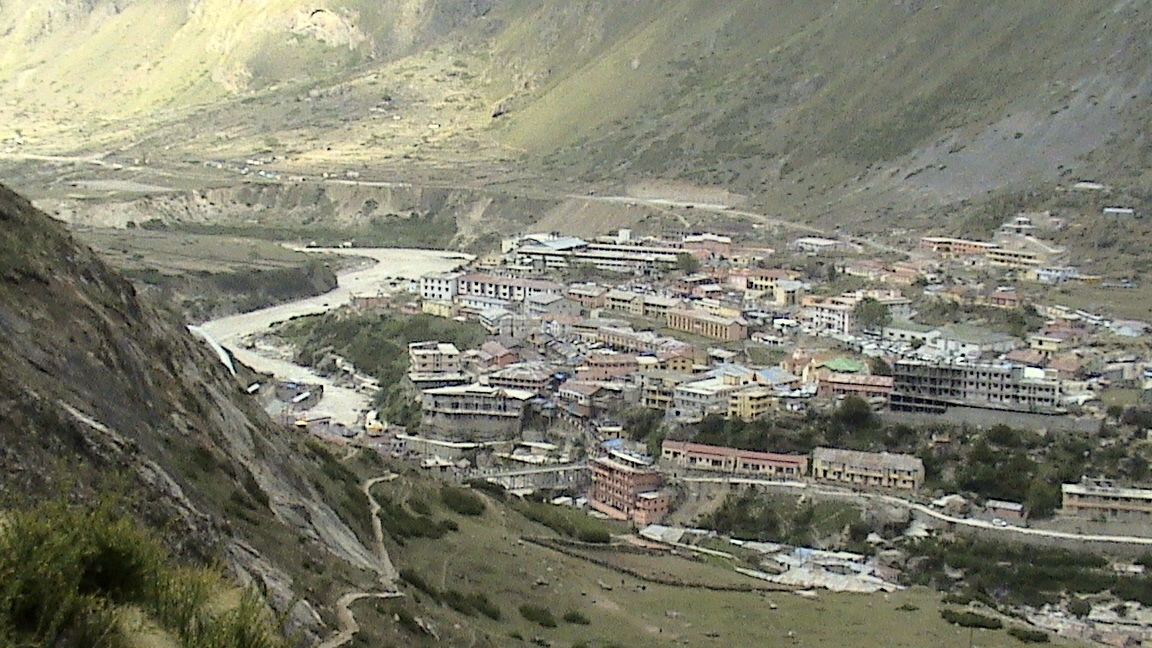
Badrinath Valley, along the Alaknanda River, Uttarakhand.

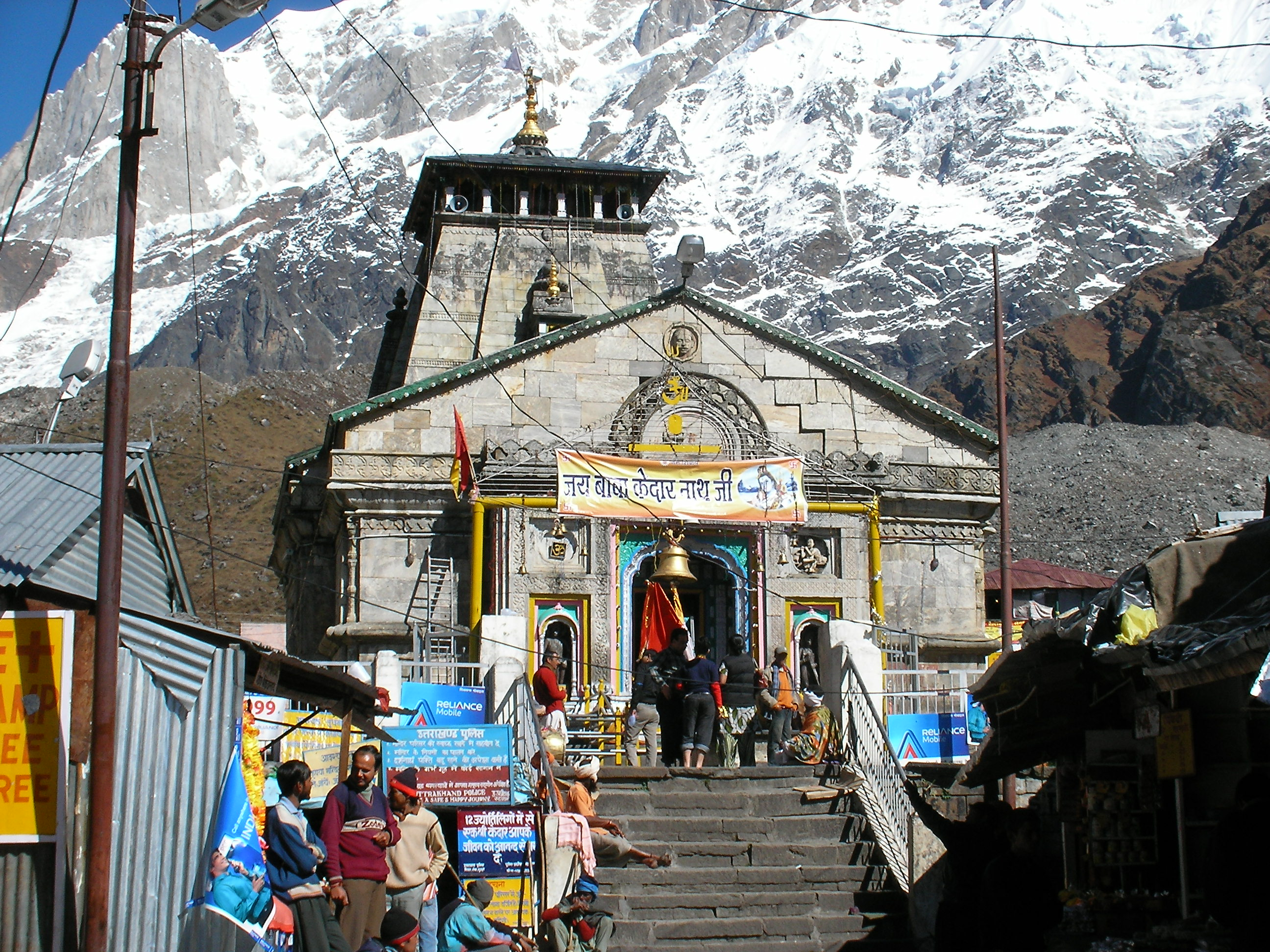
Kedarnath II

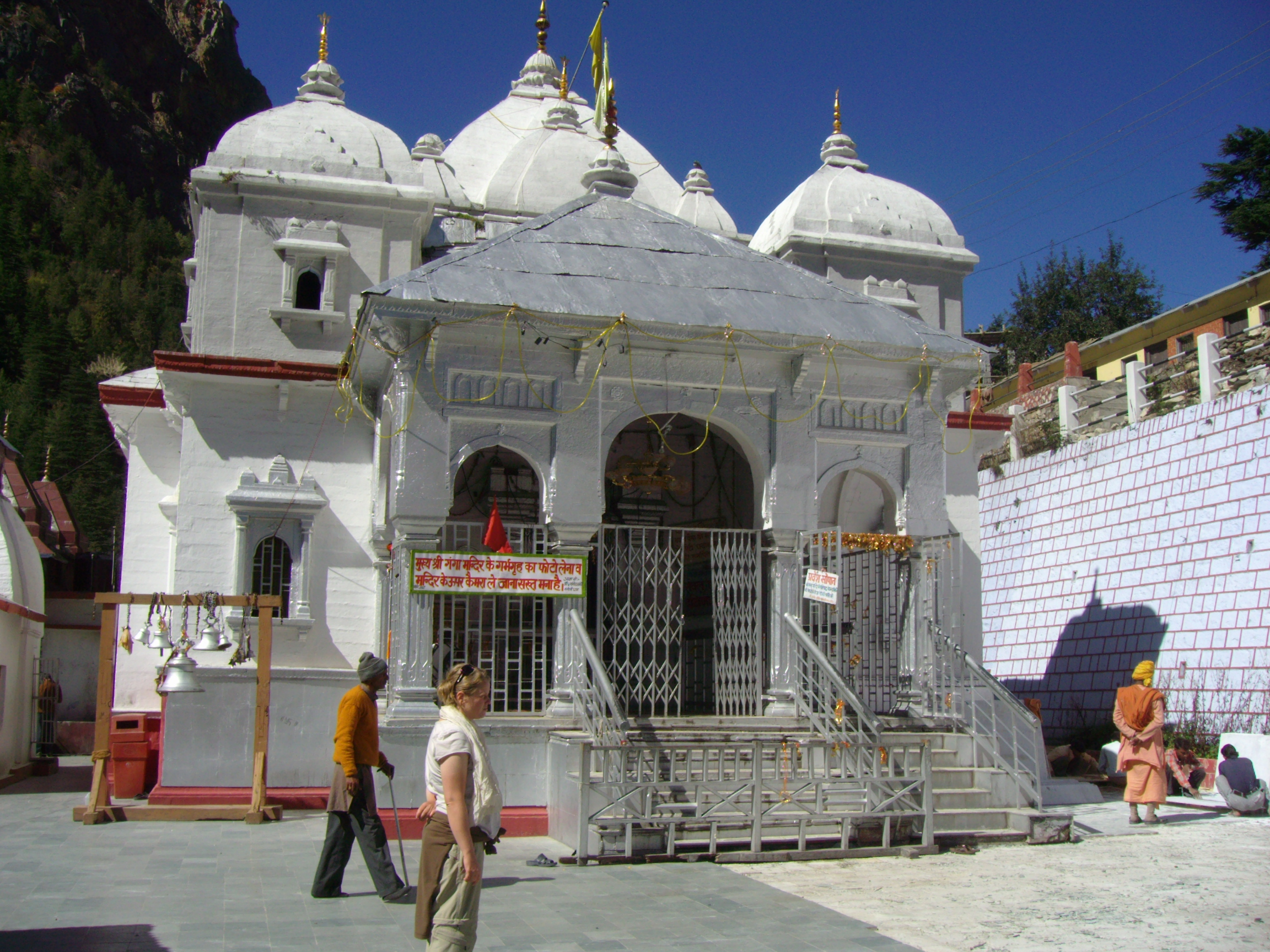
Gangotri temple

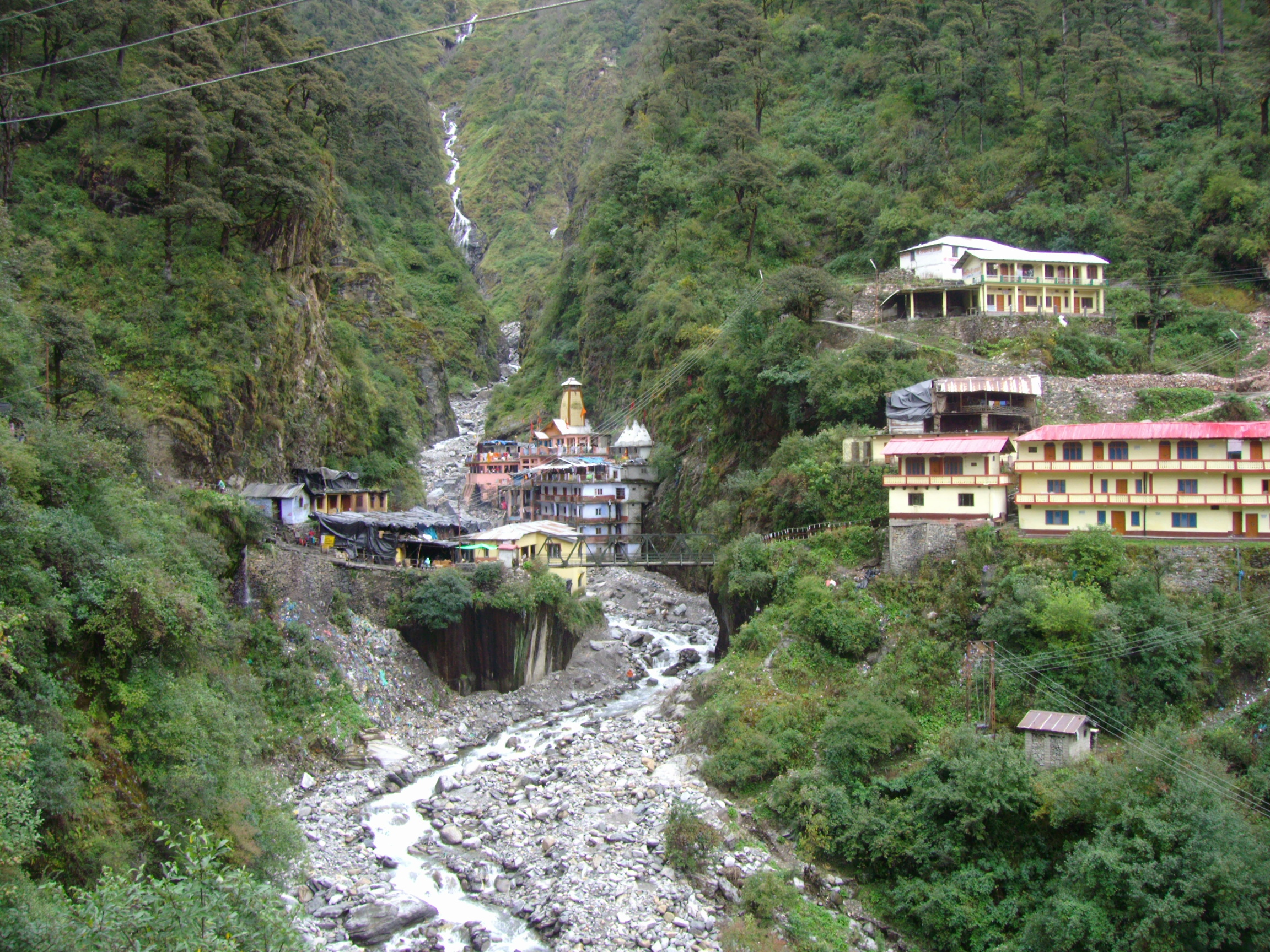
Yamunotri temple and ashram

Uttarakhand is famous for Chota Char Dham, which means 'journey to four centers'. These four religious centers in Uttarakhand are represented by Badrinath (dedicated to Lord Vishnu), Kedarnath (dedicated to Lord Shiva), Gangotri (the holy origin of the river Ganga) and Yamunotri (the holy origin of the river Yamuna). Badrinath is part of the bigger Char Dham.

The Char Dham Yatra begins around the first to second week of May every year. These dates are announced in the national media. The base for the yatra is generally the Rishikesh town which has all the amenities available for pilgrims and tourists alike. Pilgrims and tourists generally book their journey through the local travel agents to all the four locations.

=== Badrinath ===
Badrinath is the abode of Lord Vishnu, who is called 'Badri Vishal', Badri the Big One. Legend has it that Badrinath was the abode of Lord Shiva, who used to reside there with his consort Parvati. It is Located in Chamoli District of Uttarakhand. Lord Vishnu happened to like the place and wished to reside there permanently, so He took the form of an infant and started crying inconsolably. Mother Parvati's heart melted and she picked up the infant Vishnu and started cradling Him. The crying of the infant, however, disturbed the meditation of Lord Shiva and unable to bear the crying He left for higher reaches of the Himalayas and made Kedarnath His home. Once Lord Shiva left, Mother Parvati too followed, which gave an opportunity to Lord Vishnu to take His original form and remain at Badrinath forever. The priests of Badrinath are from the southernmost part of India, i.e. Kerala. This is according to the rules laid down by Adi Shankara. Badrinath remains out of bounds for pilgrims for six months a year, from October to May.

=== Kedarnath ===
Kedarnath is the abode of Lord Shiva. Kedarnath is one of the twelve Jyotirlingams of India and the only one in the Uttarakhand. While there is a motorable road to Badrinath, Kedarnath could only be reached by foot. The 18-kilometre (11 mi) trek begins from Gaurikund. After the 2013 Himalayan floods, the trek currently is of more than 18 km (11 mi) due to washing away of trekking paths.

=== Gangotri ===
Gangotri is the origin of the holy Ganga. Ganga is revered as a mother throughout India. According to the Hindu philosophy, a place considered extremely holy if a river running through it flows in the northern direction. Gangotri is a place which is not only the origin of Ganga but also where Ganga flows in a northerly direction, hence the name Gangotri. The river Ganga flows out from the melting Gangotri glacier, which is at a distance of around 18 km (11 mi) from the Gangotri town. Close to the temple is Bhagirath Shila, which according to the Hindu philosophy is the place where Bhagirath did penance for 5500 years to seek the blessings of Mother Ganga and requested her to descend to the Earth from her heavenly abode to cleanse the sins of his ancestors.

=== Yamunotri ===
Yamunotri is the origin of the holy river Yamuna. A temple dedicated to the holy river Yamuna is situated at the place. The actual origin of the river is the Yamunotri glacier further up into the Himalayas where very few pilgrims go due to the difficulty it entails.

== Panch Kedar ==
Panch Kedar (Sanskrit: पंचकेदार) refers to five Hindu temples or holy places of the Shaivite sect dedicated to god Shiva. They are located in the Garhwal Himalayan region in Uttarakhand, India. They are the subject of many legends that directly link their creation to Pandavas, the heroes of the Hindu Indian epic, the Mahabharata.

The five temples designated in the strict pecking order to be followed for pilgrimage for worship are the Kedarnath (Sanskrit: केदारनाथ) at an altitude of 3,583 m (11,755 ft), the Tungnath (तुंगनाथ)(3,680 m or 12,070 ft), Rudranath (रुद्रनाथ) (2,286 m or 7,500 ft), Madhyamaheshwar (मध्यमहेश्वर) or Madmaheshwar (3,490 m or 11,450 ft) and Kalpeshwar (कल्पेश्वर) (2,200 m or 7,200 ft). The Kedarnath is the main temple, which is part of the four famous Chota Char Dhams (literally 'the small four abodes/seats') or pilgrimage centers of the Garhwal Himalayas; the other three dhams are the Badrinath, Yamunotri and Gangotri. Kedarnath is also one of the twelve Jyotirlingas.

The Garhwal region is also called the Kedar-Khanda after Kedar – the local name for Lord Shiva. The region abounds in emblems and aniconic forms of Shiva sect of Lord Shiva, much more than the Vaishnava sect. The western part of this region in particular, which constitutes half of Chamoli district being known as Kedar-Kshetra or Kedar mandala, encompasses in its ambit all the five temples constituting the Panch Kedar.

=== Legend of Panch Kedar ===
The most famous folk legend about Panch Kedar relates to the Pandavas, the heroes of the Hindu epic Mahabharata. The Pandavas defeated and killed their cousins – the Kauravas in the epic Kurukshetra War. They wished to atone for the sins of committing fratricide (gotra hatya) and Brāhmanahatya (killing of Brahmins – the priest class) during the war. Thus, they handed over the reins of their kingdom to their kin and left in search of the god Shiva and to seek his blessings. First, they went to the holy city of Varanasi (Kashi), believed to Shiva's favourite city and known for its Shiva temple. But, Shiva wanted to avoid them as he was deeply incensed by the death and dishonesty at the Kurukshetra war and was, therefore, insensitive to Pandavas' prayers. Therefore, he assumed the form of a bull (Nandi) and hid in the Garhwal region.

Not finding Shiva in Varanasi, the Pandavas went to Garhwal Himalayas. Bhima, the second of the five Pandava brothers, then standing astride two mountains started to look for Shiva. He saw a bull grazing near Guptakashi ("hidden Kashi" – the name derived from the hiding act of Shiva). Bhima immediately recognized the bull to be Shiva. Bhima caught hold of the bull by its tail and hind legs. But the bull-formed Shiva disappeared into the ground to later reappear in parts, with the hump raising in Kedarnath, the arms appearing in Tunganath, the nabhi (navel) and stomach surfacing in Madhyamaheshwar, the face showing up at Rudranath and the hair and the head appearing in Kalpeshwar. The Pandavas pleased with this reappearance in five different forms, built temples at the five places for venerating and worshipping Shiva. The Pandavas were thus freed from their sins. It is also believed that the fore portions of Shiva appeared at Pashupatinath, Kathmandu – the capital of Nepal.

A variant of the tale credits Bhima of not only catching the bull, but also stopping it from disappearing. Consequently, the bull was torn asunder into five parts and appeared at five locations in the Kedar Khand of Garhwal region of the Himalayas. After building the Panch Kedar temples, the Pandavas mediated at Kedarnath for salvation, performed yagna (fire sacrifice) and then through the heavenly path called the Mahapanth (also called Swargarohini), attained heaven or salvation.

After completing the pilgrimage of Lord Shiva's darshan at the Panch Kedar temples, it is an unwritten religious rite to visit Lord Vishnu at the Badrinath Temple, as a final affirmatory proof by the devotee that he has sought blessings of Lord Shiva.

== Panch Kailash ==
Of the Panch Kailash (literally - the Five Kailashas), the collective name for the group of five Himalayan mountain peaks at separate locations sacred in Hinduism each with Kailash in its name, the second most sacred Adi Kailash is in Uttarakhand, the most sacred of all is the Mount Kailash is in Tibet, and the rest - Shrikhand Mahadev Kailash (aka Shikhar Kailash), Kinnaur Kailash (aka Kinner Kailash), and Manimahesh Kailash (aka Chamba Kailash) are all in the state of Himachal Pradesh of India.

== Panch Prayag ==
Panch Prayag (Sanskrit: पंच-प्रयाग) is an expression in Hindu religious ethos, specifically used to connote the five sacred river confluences in the Garhwal Himalayas in the state of Uttarakhand, India. The five Sanskrit: prayags (meaning 'confluence'; also termed rayag pentad 'five river-confluences'), are, in descending flow sequence of their occurrence: Vishnu Prayag; Nand Prayag; Karn prayag; Rudra Prayag; and Dev Prayag.

=== Vishnu Prayag ===
The Alaknanda River, which originates in the eastern slopes of glacier fields of Chaukhamba, is joined by the Saraswathi River near Mana (that originates on the south from the international border), and then flows in front of the Badrinath temple, one of the most revered Hindu shrines. It then meets the Dhauli Ganges River, whose origin is from the Niti Pass, after traveling a distance of 25 km (15.5 mi) from its source to form the Vishnu Prayag (30°33′45″N 79°34′31″E). This stretch of the Alaknanda River is called the Vishnu Ganges. Legend narrates the worship offered by sage Narada to god Vishnu at this confluence. An octagonal shaped temple – located near the confluence – dated to 1889, is credited to Maharani of Indore – Ahalyabai. Though originally built to install a Shiva linga, it now houses a Vishnu image. A stairway from this temple leads to the Vishnu kund (kund means pool of water or lake) at the confluence, which is seen in a tranquil state.

=== Nanda Prayag ===
Nand Prayag (30°19′56″N 79°18′55″E) is the second prayag in the cascade sequence of the confluences where the Nandakini River joins the main Alaknanda River. According to one tale, a noble King Nanda performed Yagnya (fire-sacrifice) and sought blessings of God. Hence, the confluence is named after him. The other version of the legend states that the confluence derives its name from the Yadava king Nanda, the foster-father of god Krishna. According to the legend, Vishnu granted a boon of the birth of a son to Nanda and his wife Yashoda and also the same boon to Devaki, wife of Vasudeva. Placed in a dilemma, since both were his disciples, he ensured that Krishna, an incarnation of Vishnu, was born to Devaki and Vasudeva but was fostered by Yashoda and Nanda. There is temple for Gopal, a form of Krishna, here. The legends also narrate that sage Kanva did penance here and also that the wedding of King Dushyanta and Shakuntala took place at this venue.

=== Karna Prayag ===
Karn Prayag (30°15′49″N 79°12′56″E) is the location where Alaknanda River is joined by the Pindar River that originates from the Pindar glacier, below the Nanda Devi hill range. The epic Mahabharata legend narrates that Karna did penance here and earned the protective gear of Kavacha (armour) and Kundala (ear rings) from his father, the Sun god, which gave him indestructible powers. The name of the confluence is thus derived from the name of Karna. There is reference to this site in Meghaduta, a Sanskrit lyrical poetic drama written by the legendary poet Kalidasa, which attributes that Satopanth and Bhagirath glaciers joined here to form the Pindar River. Another classic work by the same author called the Abhijnana-shakuntala also mentions that Shakuntala and king Dushyanta's romantic daliance occurred here. It is also mentioned that Swami Vivekananda mediatated here for eighteen days.

The stone seat where Karna did penance is also seen here. A temple built in recent times to commemorate Karna has the deity of goddess Uma Devi (daughter of the Himalayas) here. The stone temple was rebuilt by guru Adi Shankaracharya. In the sanctum, the images of goddess Parvati, her consort Shiva and her elephant-headed son Ganesha are installed, next to that of Uma Devi, apart from Karna's image. A steep row of steps from the temple along a spur leads to the confluence point. And, down these steps, small shrines of Shiva and the Binayak Shila (the Ganesha stone) – that is believed to provide protection from danger – are located. Once every twelve years, a procession of the image of Uma Devi is taken around a few villages in the sub-divisional town of Karnaprayag.

=== Rudra Prayag ===
At Rudra Prayag (30°17′16″N 78°58′43″E) the Alaknanda meets the Mandakini River. The confluence is named after god Shiva, who is also known as Rudra. According to a widely narrated legend, Shiva performed the Tandava here, Tandava is a vigorous dance that is the source of the cycle of creation, preservation, and dissolution. Shiva also played his favourite musical instrument the Rudra veena here. By playing the Veena, he enticed god Vishnu to his presence and converted him to water.

=== Somdhara ===
Somdhara is a Himalayan peak in the remote Kumaon region of Uttarakhand, India, near the India–Tibet frontier. It is located at approximately 30°52′02″ N, 80°00′35″ E and rises to about 5,346 metres. The name combines Som (meaning moon) and Dhara (meaning) stream, reflecting its traditional geographic and cultural significance locally.

=== Dev Prayag ===
Dev Prayag (30°08′43″N 78°35′52″E) is the confluence of the two holy rivers, the Bhagirathi – the chief stream of the Ganges and the Alaknanda. It is the first Prayag on the way to Badrinath. Beyond this confluence, the river is known as Ganges. The holiness of this place is considered equal to the famous Triveni sangam confluence at Allahabad where the Ganges, Yamuna and Saraswati rivers merge.

The confluence of the Bhagirathi, which flows in rapids with strong currents meets a much calmer river in the Alaknanda and this has been vividly described by the British captain Raper as:

The contrast between the two rivers joining here is striking. The Bhaghirathi runs down a steep declivity with rapid force, roaring and foaming flowing over large fragments placed in its bed, while the placid, Alakananda, flowing, with a smooth, unruffled surface, gently winds round the point till, meeting with her turbulent consort, she is forcibly hurried down, and unites her clamours with the blustering current.

== Religious tourism hubs ==
=== Haridwar and Kumbh Mela ===
Haridwar is an important city in the religious architecture of the country, as i also hosts the Kumbh Mela. The large number of people gathering on the bathing ghats on the holy Ganges river gives the place a chaotic feel. There are a number of Hindu temples, ashrams and dharamshalas (pilgrims' rest houses) in the city. The city also serves as the entry point to the nearby Rajaji National Park.

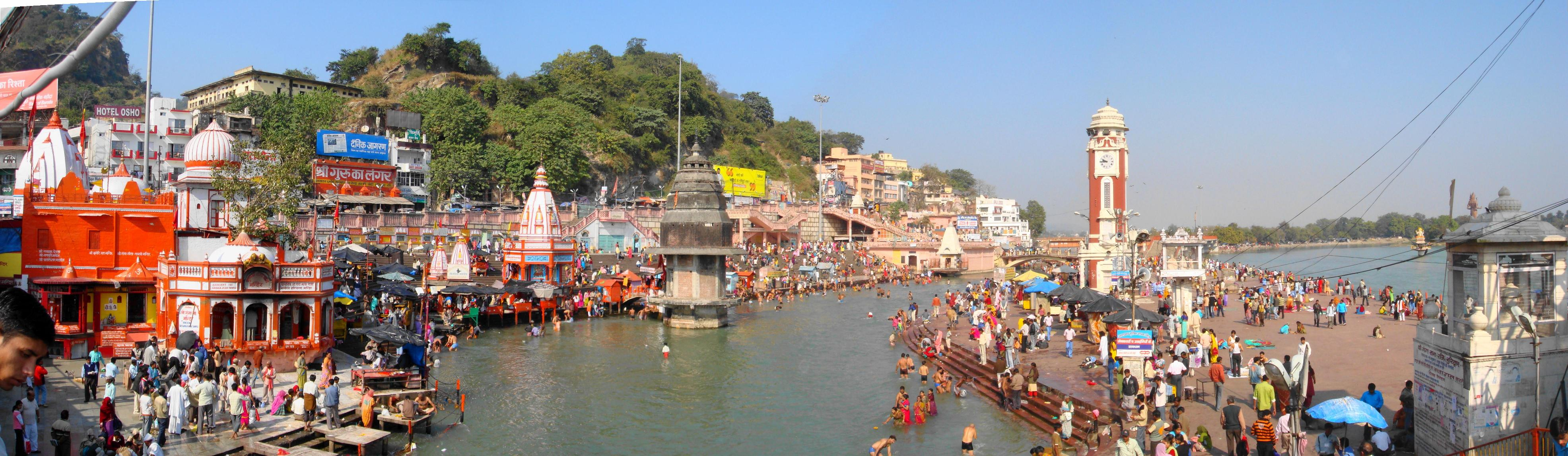
Panoramic view of Har ki Pauri, Haridwar.

=== Rishikesh ===
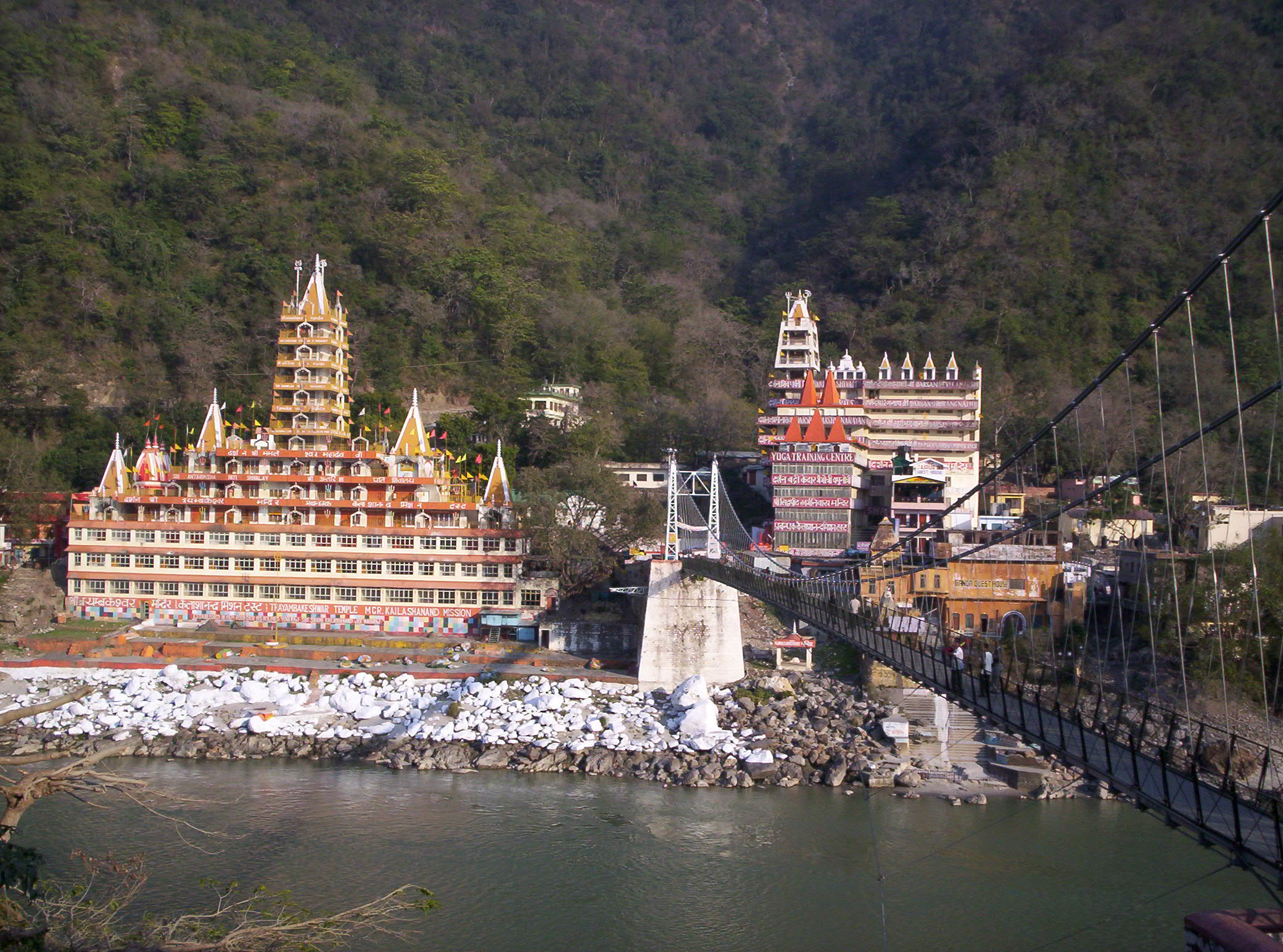
Rishikesh view and 13 stories Shiva temple across Lakshman Jhula bridge over the Ganges.

Rishikesh has been a popular place for spiritual seekers since the late 60's when The Beatles rocked up Maharishi Mahesh Yogi's ashram. Known as the 'Yoga Capital of the World' because of the large number of ashrams teaching meditation and yoga. The northern part of the main town is the hotspot for all the action where the Ganges forested hills form a conducive environment for all the meditation. The evening aarti also draws a lot of crowd.

Rishikesh also draws a lot of adventure sports lovers for Rafting, Bungee Jumping and Camping adventures on the banks of River Ganges.

== Lakes ==
=== Kumaon region ===
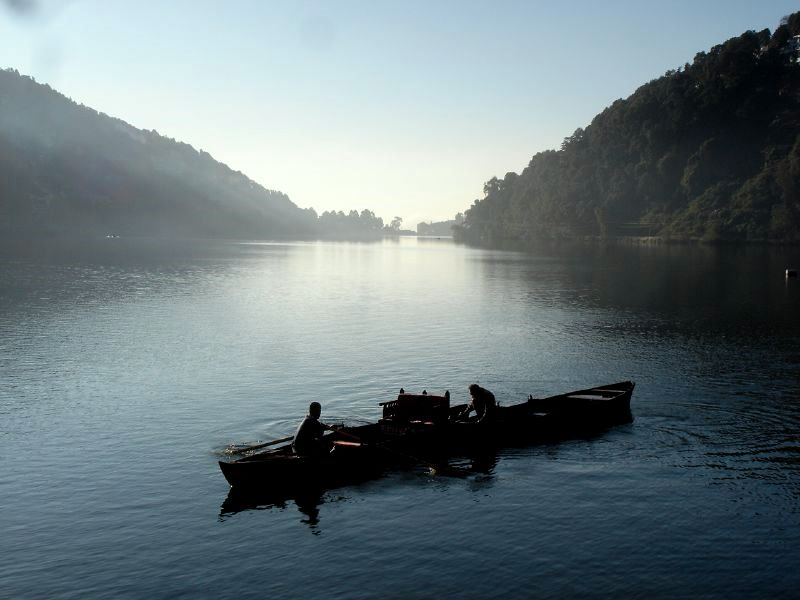
Nainital

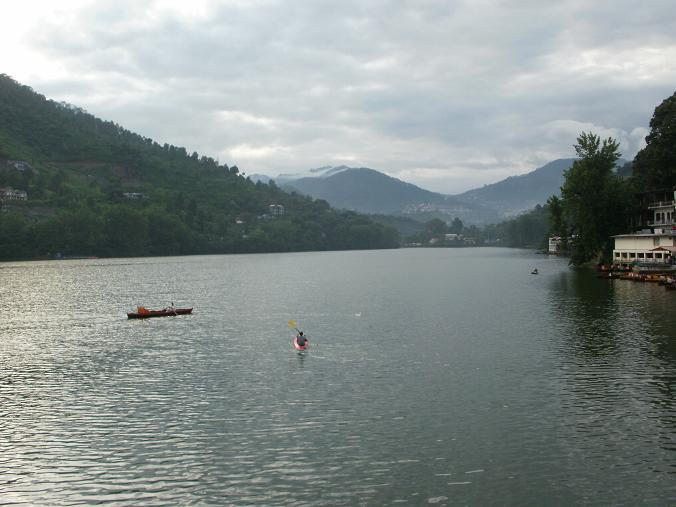
Bhimtal

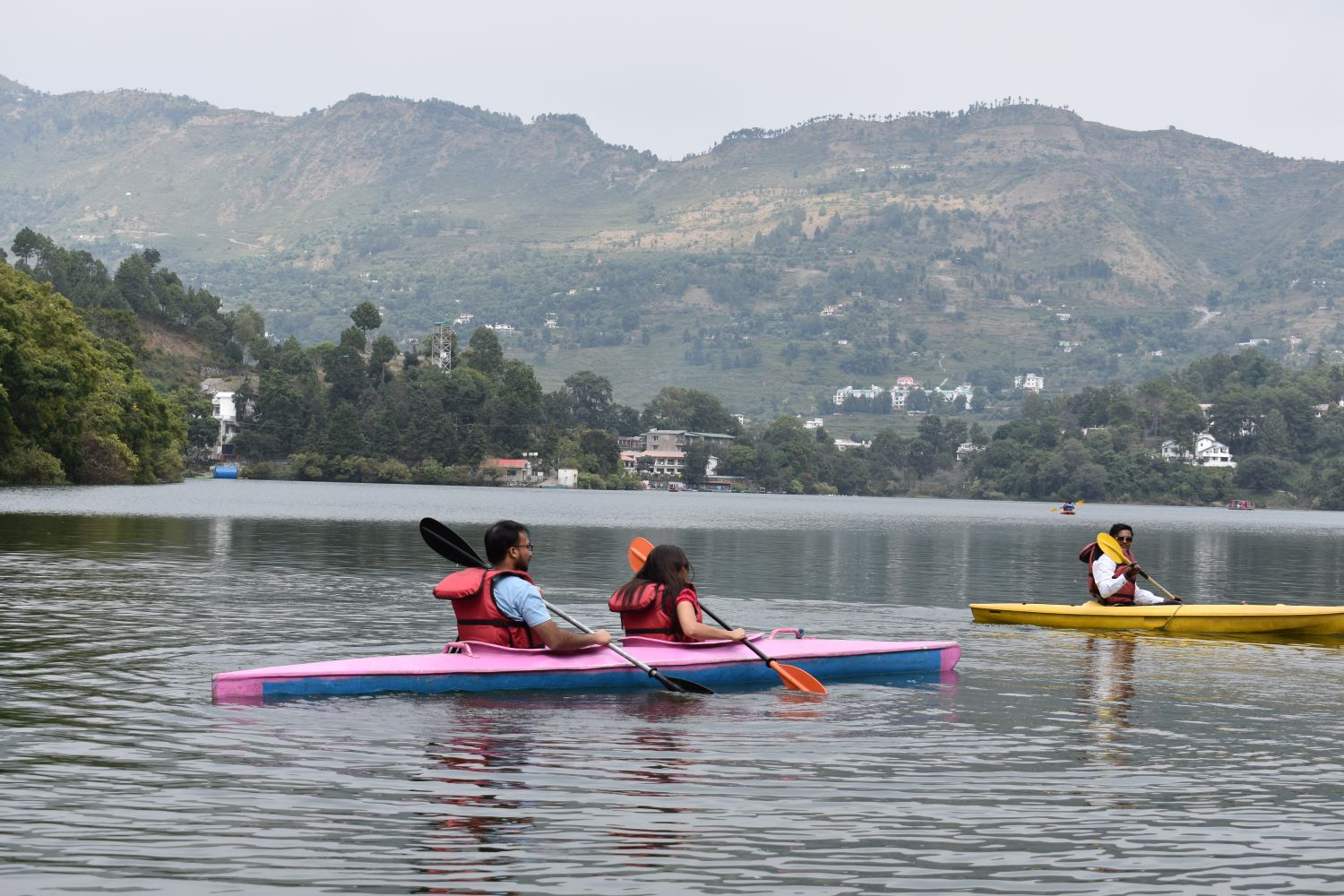
Naukuchiatal

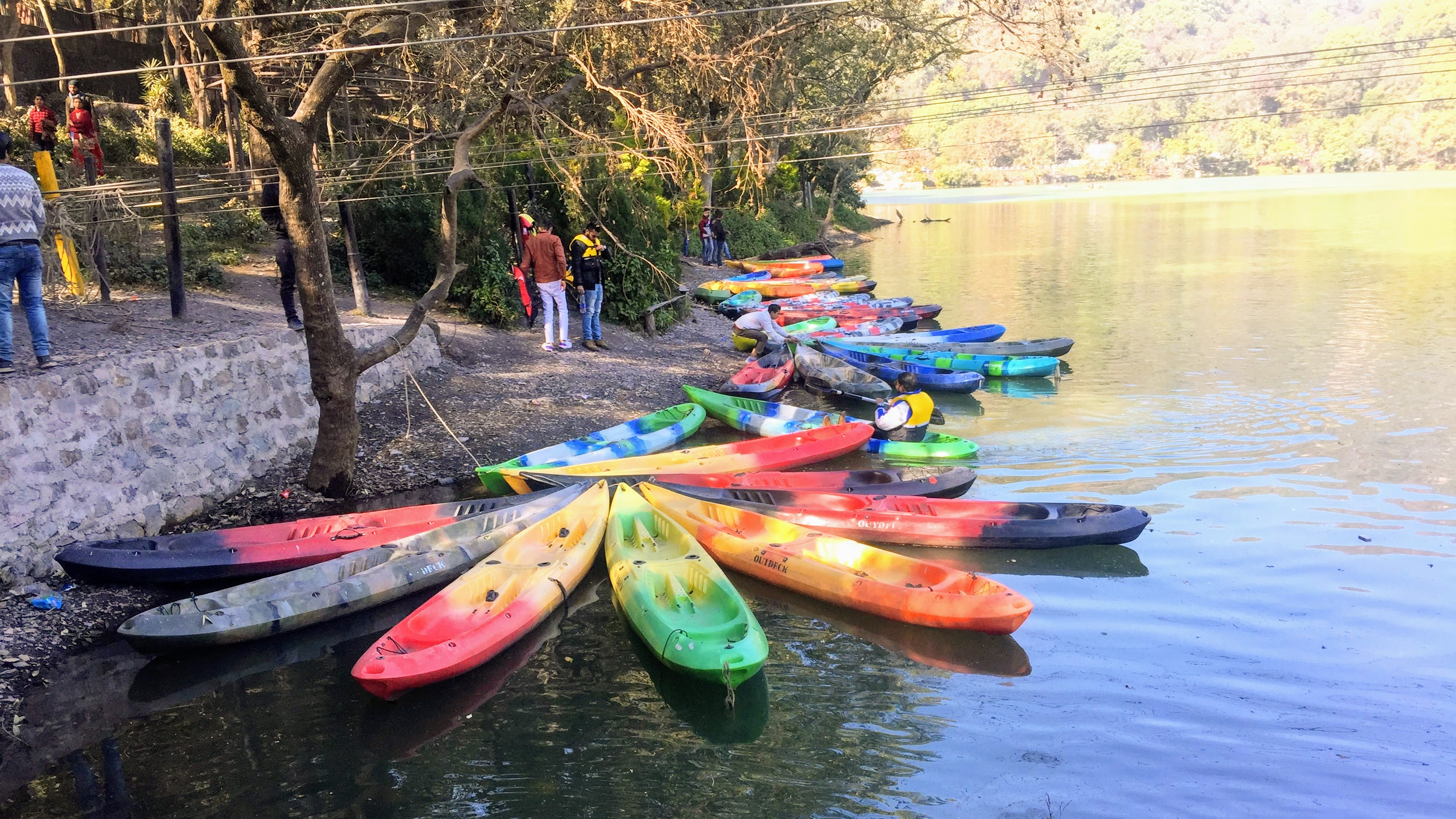
Sattal

The Kumaon region of Uttarakhand is home to several freshwater lakes. Most of these lakes are situated in Nainital district, due to which, Nainital is also known as the Lake district of India, and four of them – Nainital, Bhimtal, Naukuchiatal and Sattal (which is a collection of seven different lakes viz Purna Tal, Ram Tal, Sita Tal, Laxman Tal, Nal Damayanti Tal, Sukha Tal and Garud Tal) are under restoration with funds provided by the National Lake Conservation Plan (NLCP) of the Government of India. Other prominent lakes in the region include Khurpatal, Sariyatal, Malwatal and Kamaltal.

=== Garhwal region ===
==== Tehri Dam ====
With a height of 260.5 m (855 ft) Tehri Dam is the tallest dam in India. It is currently ranked No 10 on the List of Tallest Dams in the world. With a total planned installed capacity of 2400 MW, it's the biggest Hydroelectric power plant in India on the Bhagirathi River in New Tehri, Tehri Garhwal district.

== National parks and bio-reserves ==
=== National parks ===
- Jim Corbett National Park, is the first national park in India. This park attracts about 500,000 tourists every year(in 1999). There are 12 National Parks and Wildlife Sanctuaries covering 13.8 percent of the total area of the state. Nanda Devi National Park (biosphere reserve) and Valley of Flowers National Park are UNESCO World Heritage sites. Also, people visit Jim Corbett in large numbers for Jeep and Canter Safari.
- Gangotri National Park
- Govind Pashu Vihar National Park
- Nanda Devi National Park
- Rajaji National Park
- Valley of Flowers National Park

=== Wildlife sanctuaries ===
- Askot Musk Deer Sanctuary
- Binsar Wildlife Sanctuary
- Kedarnath Wildlife Sanctuary
- Mussoorie Wildlife Sanctuary
- Naina Devi Himalayan Bird Conservation Reserve
- Nandhaur Wildlife Sanctuary
- Sitabani Wildlife Reserve

== Hill Stations ==
=== Mussoorie ===
Mussoorie, also known as the Queen of Hills, is one of the most popular hill stations in the country. This tourist destination, located 35 km from Dehradun, is known for its views of the Himalayan ranges. Being situated at an altitude of about 2,005 meters (6,578 ft) above sea level, the climate here is cool and temperate. Mussoorie is also known for its major tourist spots, such as the Mall Road, Lal Tibba, Picture Palace, Library Chowk, Jari Pani and George Everest, surrounded by colonial-era bungalows and churches.

=== Dhanaulti ===
Dhanaulti, about 35 km (22 mi) from Mussoorie, is a hill station in the Tehri Garhwal district of Uttarakhand. It is situated in the Himalayan mountain range at an altitude of about 2,250 metres (7,380 ft) above sea level and is known for its views and forests of deodar. Dhanaulti is a destination for adventure activities like trekking, camping, and ziplining. The city is also known for its ecotourism initiatives, such as the Surkanda Devi Temple and the Dhanaulti Adventure Park.

=== Auli ===
Auli is a hill station and ski Destination located in the Chamoli district of Uttarakhand. It is situated in the Himalayan mountain range at an altitude of about 2,909 metres (9,544 ft) above sea level. It is known for its snow-capped slopes and views of the surrounding peaks. Auli is located at a distance of about 10 km from Joshimath, which serves as the base town for Auli. Auli is also used as a base for trekking, skiing, camping and other outdoor activities in the surrounding area.

=== Nainital ===
Known as the "City of Lakes," Nainital is a picturesque hill station situated at an altitude of about 2,084 meters above sea level and the foothills of the Kumaon Range. The main attractions of Nainital city are situated around the natural freshwater lake named Naini Lake. The lake is surrounded by hills and pine forests and is a common spot for boating and other water sports. This hill station is known for its Mall Road, a shopping and dining area. Nainital attracts tourists with its many colonial-era bungalows and churches, home to a cool, temperate climate.

=== Chakrata ===
Chakrata is a hill station and cantonment located in the Dehradun district of Uttarakhand. It is situated in the Himalayan mountain range at an altitude of about 2,118 meters above sea level and is known for its views and forests. Located about 100 km from the capital Dehradun, this place is ideal for trekking, camping and other outdoor activities. The city is also home to Tiger Falls, which attracts many tourists.

=== Munsiyari ===
Munsiyari is a unique hill village situated amidst the snowy ranges of Pithoragarh district, which remains covered with snow most of the time. It is situated in the Himalayan mountain range at an altitude of about 2,200 meters above sea level and is known for its scenery and green forests. The city is also known for its local cuisine and handicrafts. The climate of Munsiyari is cool and temperate, the atmosphere here drenches everyone who comes.

== Mountain passes ==
For tourism, trekking and religious pilgrimage,

- Chamoli district
  - Mana Pass, connects to Mana village, known as the first Indian village before the Tibet border, situated about 47 km north of Badrinath within the Nanda Devi Biosphere Reserve.
- Pithoragarh district
  - Lipulekh Pass, connects India with Mount Kailash and Lake Manasarovar in Tibet for the Kailash Mansarovar Yatra Hinduism pilgrimage.
  - Old Lipulekh Pass, on the western shoulder of the Lipulekh Pass, from here too the Mount Kailash can be seen.
  - Nama Pass, connects Kuthi and Darma valleys.
  - Sin La, connects Darma Valley to Jolingkong Lake in the Kuthi Yankti valley. Adi Kailash peak is visible from here on clear sunny day.
  - Traill's Pass (Pindari Kanda), connects Pindari valley to Milam Valley (Lawan Gad), it is situated at the end of Pindari glacier and between the Nanda Devi and Nanda Kot peaks.
- Uttarkashi district
  - Auden's Col, connets Rudugaira valley and Bhilangna valley+
  - Kalindi Pass, connects Gangotri and Ghastoli, the most famous trekking pass of the Garhwal Himalaya.
  - Lamkhaga Pass, (5,282 m / 17,320 ft), connects Harshil in Uttarakhand with Kinnaur district of Himachal Pradesh, is one of the toughest pass.

== Fairs and festivals ==
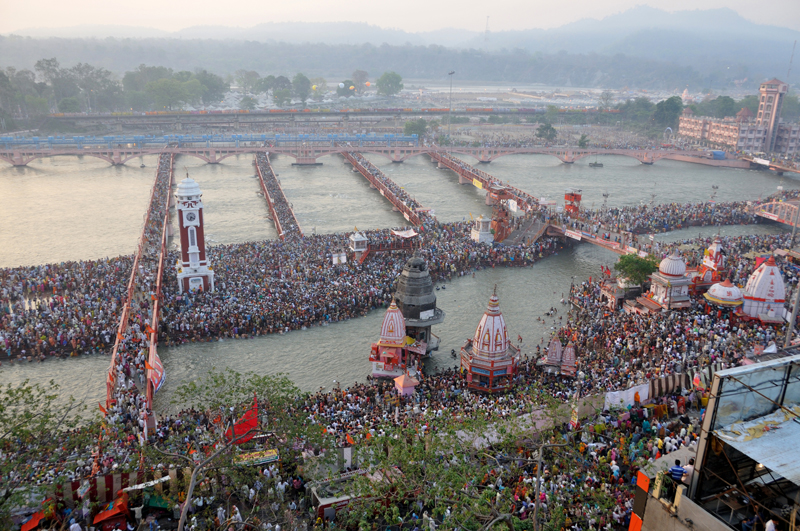
Pilgrims gather for the third Shahi Snan ('royal bath') at Har ki Pauri in Haridwar, Uttarakhand on 14 April 2010 during Haridwar Kumbh Mela.

Uttrakhand has many fairs, festivals, parikrama (clockwise religious circumambulation of sacred entities) and yatras (pilgrimages).

=== Haridwar Kumbh Mela ===
Haridwar Kumbh Mela (fair) is a major tourist attraction to the state. Haridwar is one of the four places in India where this takes place. Haridwar also has its big annual fair in the form of Magh Mela in January–February which turns into a bigger event every 6 years in the form of Ardh Magh Mela. Nanda Devi Mela and Nanda Devi Raj Yatra are great festivals of Uttarakhand, famous in all northern India. Nanda Devi Mela and Raj Yatra are the festivals of the goddess Nanda Devi, the bless-giving goddess.

=== Nanda Devi Raj Jat ===
Nanda Devi Raj Jat is a three-week-long hindu festival and Kurur to Homkund yatra (pilgrimage) organised once every 12 years in Chamoli District of Garhwal region of Uttarakhand state in India, involving a challenging trek covering around 280–290 km, with daily halts at various villages and high-altitude sites, culminating in religious ceremonies at Homkund. It begins at the Nanda Devi Siddhpith temple at Kurur village near Nandprayag, procceeds via Nauti, Ida Badhani, Kansuwa, Sem, Koti, Bhagwati, Kulsari, Nandkesari, Mundoli, Wan, Bedni Bugyal, Pathar Nachauni, Bhagwabasa,Trishuli, Roopkund, Shila Samudra, to Homkund. Future Nanda Devi Raj Jat pilgrimages are scheduled in 2026, 2038, 2050, 2062, etc. Nanda Devi Lok Jat, the annual 1-2 day long localised pilgrimages are also held in Garhwal and Kumaun.

=== Kumaoni Holi ===
Kumaoni Holi a regional variant of the Hindu festival of Holi is also very well known.

== See also ==
- Geography of Uttarakhand
- Tourism in India
- Transport in Uttarakhand
- Cablecar Ropeways in Uttarakhand
- Railway in Himachal, Jammu Kashmir and Ladakh
- Geostrategic border rail lines of India
