= Dehradun Airport =

Airport serving Dehradun, Uttarakhand, India

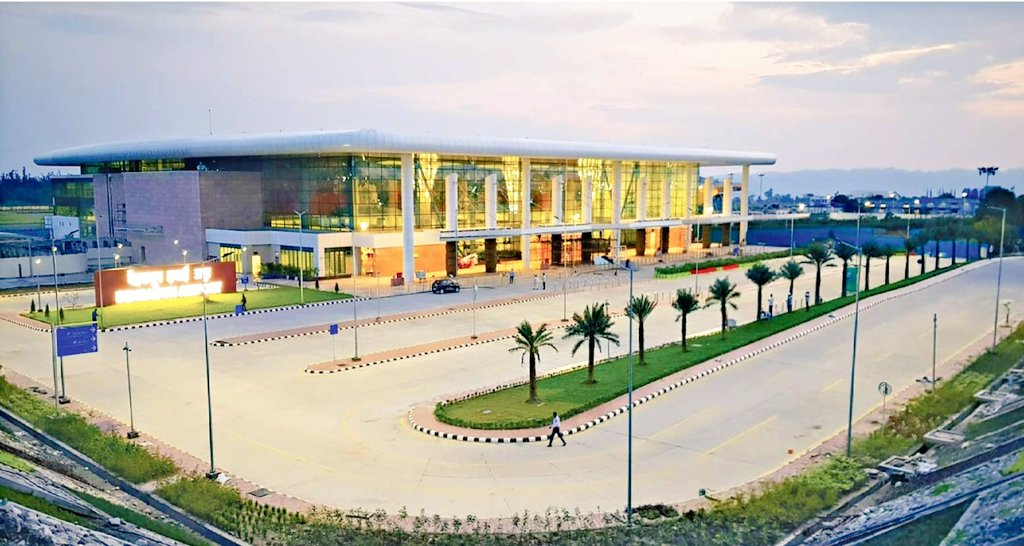
- IATA: DED; ICAO: VIDN

Summary
- Airport type: Public
- Owner: Airports Authority of India
- Operator: Airports Authority of India
- Serves: Dehradun
- Location: Jolly Grant, Dehradun district, Uttarakhand, India
- Built: 1974; 52 years ago
- Elevation AMSL: 1,857 ft (566 m)
- Coordinates: 30°11′23″N 078°10′49″E
- Website: Dehradun Airport

Map
- Location of airport in Uttarakhand DED (India)

Runways
Direction	Length		Surface
Direction	m	ft	Surface
08/26	2,140	7,000	Asphalt

Statistics (April 2025 - March 2026)
- Passengers: 18,71,115 (▲8.5%)
- Aircraft movements: 17,437 (▲13.1%)
- Cargo tonnage: 1,902.7 (▼2.9%)
- Source: AAI

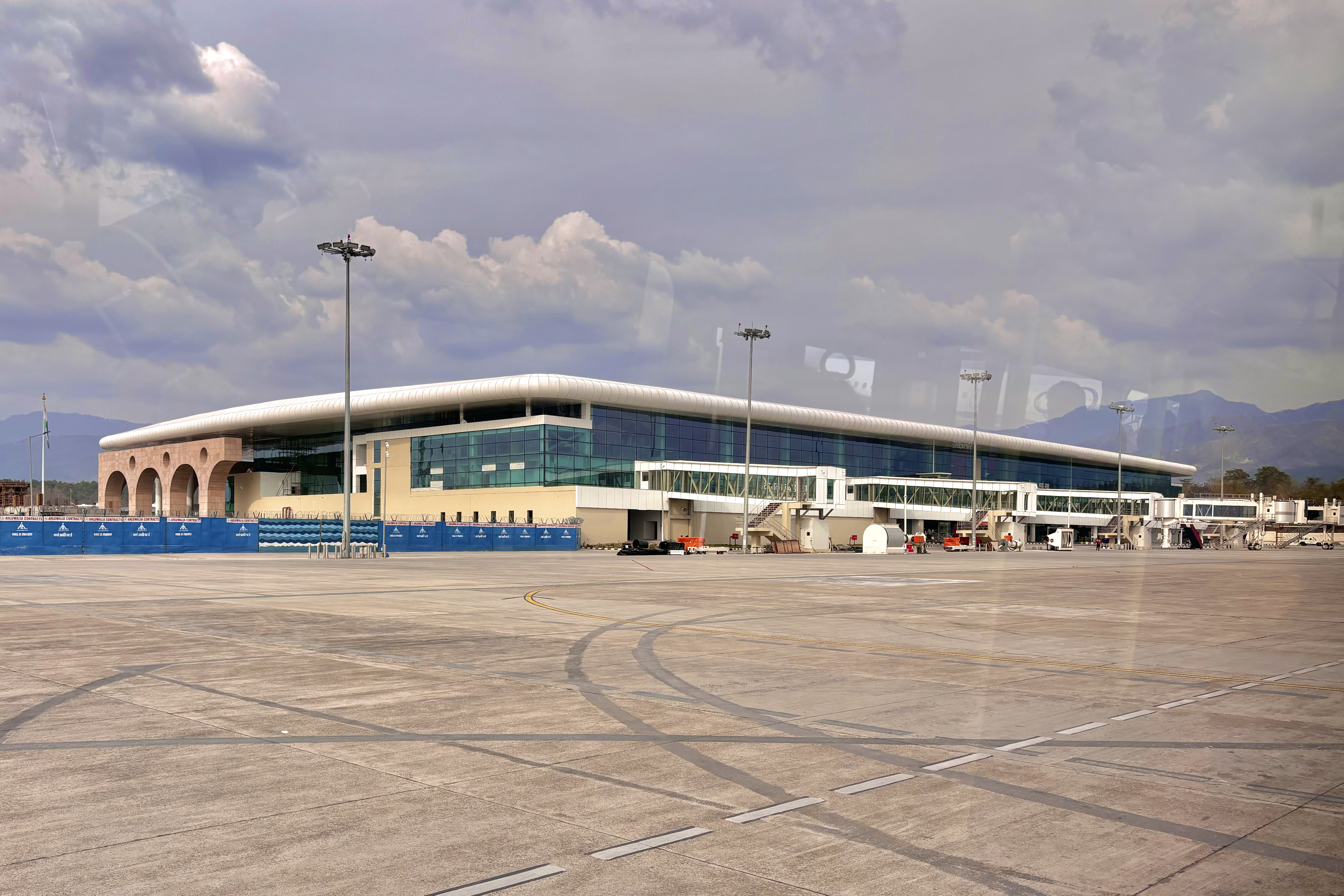
View of the new terminal from the apron

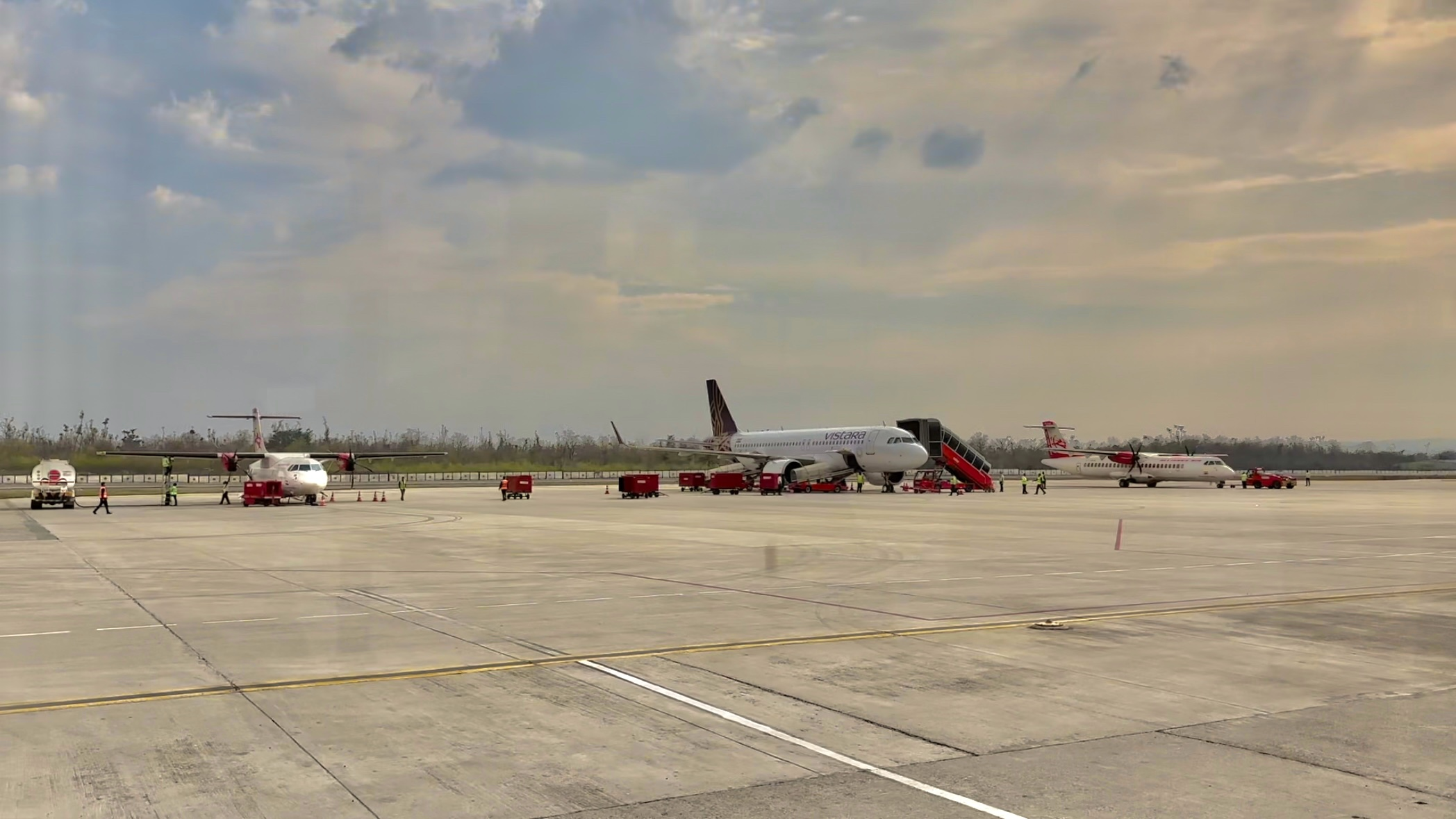
Apron area of the airport

Dehradun Airport (IATA: DED, ICAO: VIDN), also known as Jolly Grant Airport, is a domestic airport serving Dehradun, the capital of Uttarakhand, India. It is located in Jauligrant, 25 km (16 mi) south of the city, 20 km (12 mi) from Rishikesh and 35 km (22 mi) from Haridwar. Commercial operations began on 30 March 2008, after the runway was extended to accommodate larger aircraft. A new terminal building was inaugurated in February 2009. The current passenger terminal was inaugurated in October 2021. The airport is the 32nd-busiest airport in India, with over 1.5 million annual passengers.

It is also known as the Air Gateway of Garhwal and plays an important role in the tourism of Uttarakhand.

== History ==
The airport was constructed in 1974. Vayudoot operated scheduled services to New Delhi, Lucknow and Pantnagar from 1982 to 1995. Air Deccan started flights between Dehradun and New Delhi in December 2004, and added a second daily flight from August 2006.

The Airports Authority of India (AAI) suspended flight operations at the airport from March 2007 till the end of the year in order to execute its airport modernisation plan. The runway was extended from 3,500 feet to 7,000 feet and also broadened from 23 metres to 45 metres to enable the landing of narrow-body jets like the Boeing 737 and the Airbus A320. The erstwhile terminal was built in 2008, a night landing system was installed, a new terminal building and an Air Traffic Control (ATC) tower were also constructed.

The expansion work was expected to cost ₹72 crore (US$7.5 million) and was to be completed by the end of 2007. However, it took a few months longer, and scheduled flights resumed in March 2008 with Air Deccan re-launching its flights. Air India launched flights from the airport to Delhi on 28 January 2010, followed by SpiceJet in 2012.

== Development ==
The domestic terminal building at the airport, built in 2008, covered an area of 4,200 m^{2} (45,000 sq ft) and had glass and steel structure with centralised air conditioning and heating, a Flight Information Display System (FIDS) and CCTV surveillance systems. The terminal had a peak-hour passenger handling capacity of 150 passengers and annual handling capacity of 122,000. It had 11 check-in counters, an X-ray baggage scanner, three security check booths in the departures section and two baggage claim conveyor belts in the arrivals section. Its adjoining apron can accommodate two Category 'C' type of aircraft.

In September 2018, the Airports Authority of India (AAI) approached the Ministry of Environment, Forest and Climate Change (MoEFCC) for clearance to expand the airport by constructing a new integrated terminal building and allied facilities at an investment of ₹344.75 crore (US$36 million). It would be a new, centrally air-conditioned modular integrated terminal building, to be built on an area of 17,961 m^{2} (193,330 sq ft) and cover a built-up area of 30,200 m^{2} (325,000 sq ft). The erstwhile terminal was demolished in 2022 to pave way for the new terminal.

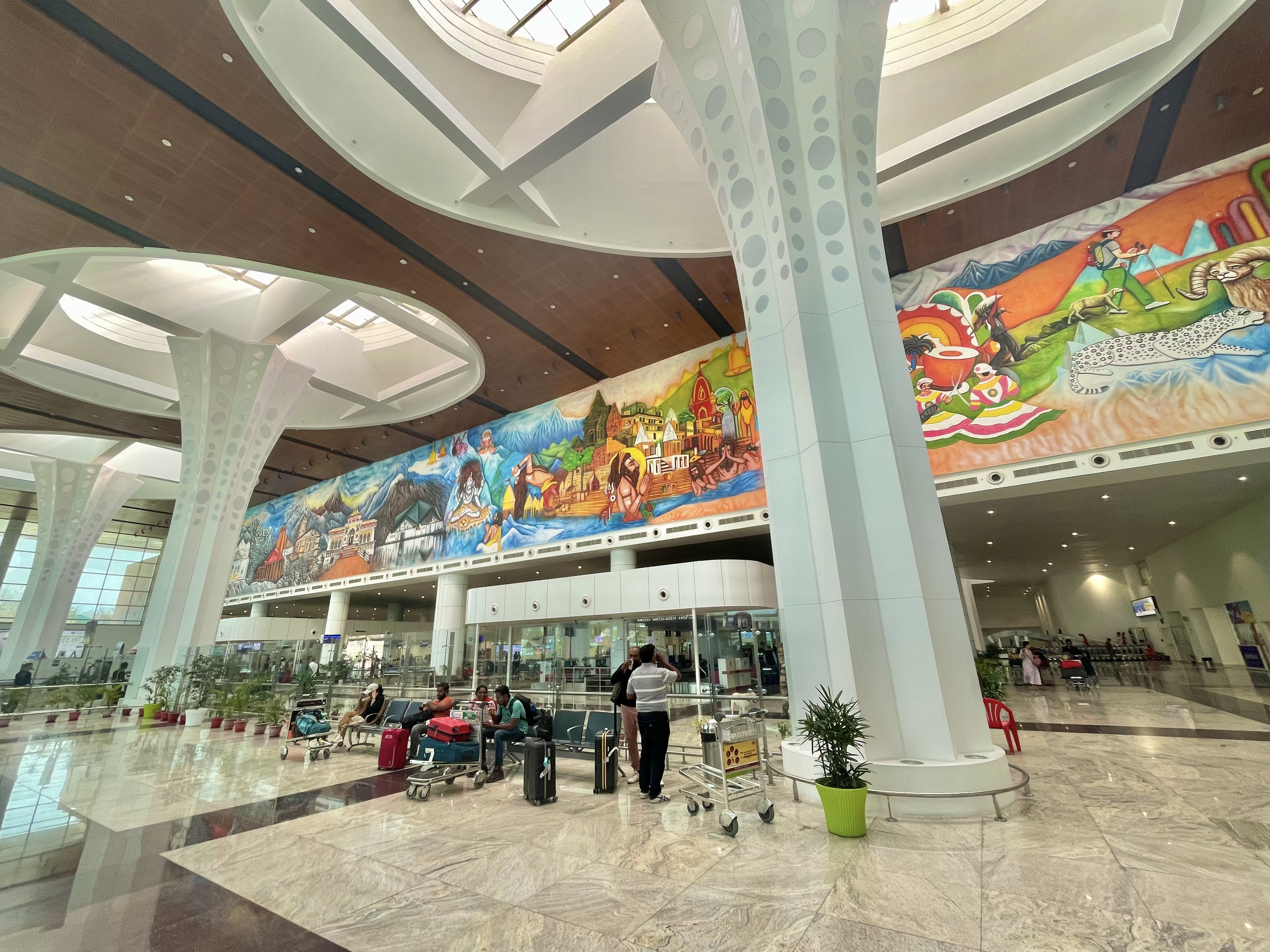
Departure/Arrival Area of the new terminal building

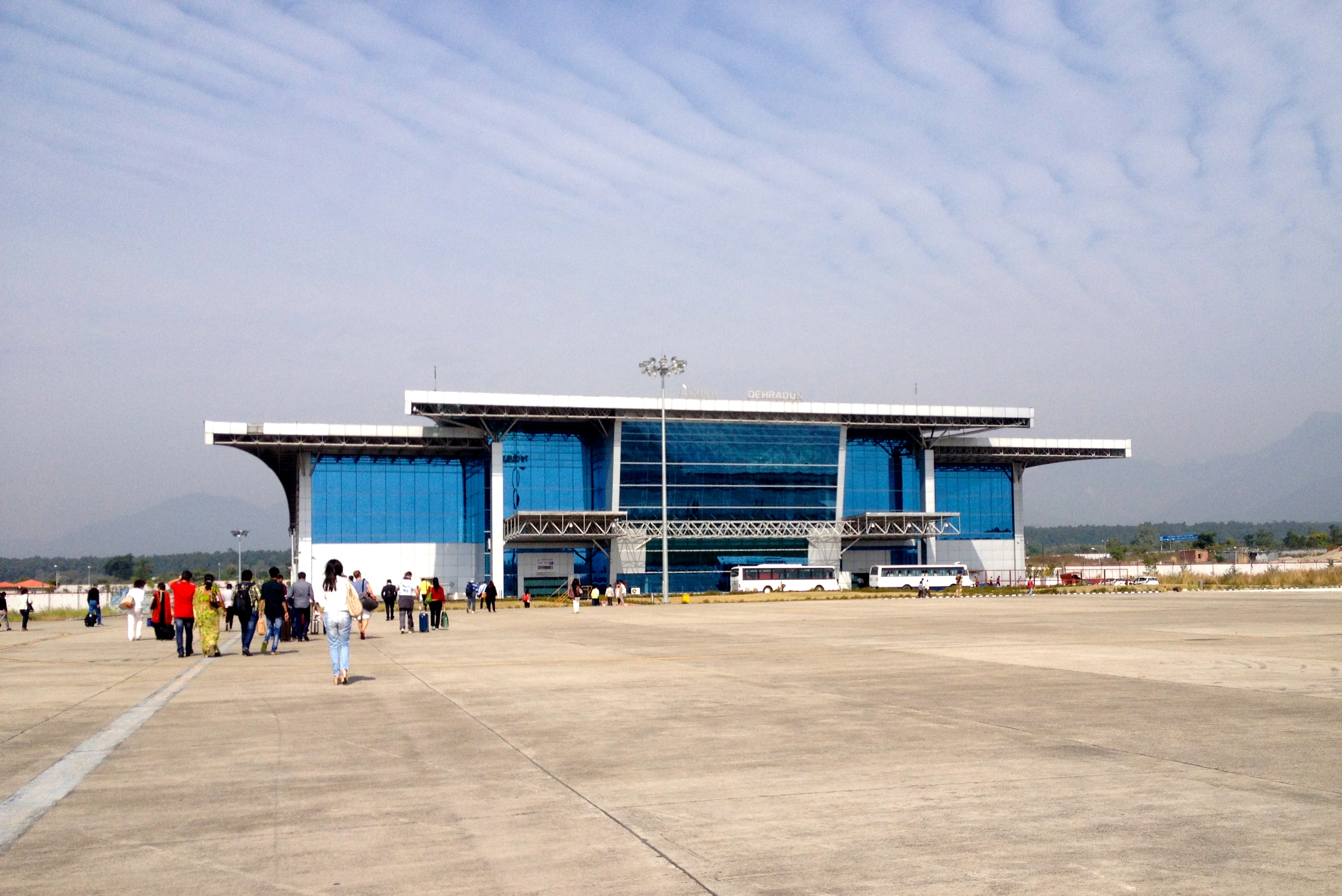
The former terminal at Dehradun Airport, demolished in 2022

The new terminal building covers an area of 42,776 m^{2} (460,440 sq ft), has a concourse, check-in area, security hold and arrival lounge on the ground floor. Offices are accommodated on the mezzanine floor. The departures area has 48 check-in counters, self-check-in kiosks, in-line baggage screening facility among many other facilities and amenities.

=== New terminal building ===
In order to meet the increasing passenger footfall in the coming years, the airport has received an expansion and full makeover. The cost of the redevelopment project has been done at about ₹486 crore (US$50 million). The Airports Authority of India (AAI) has modernised the airport in two phases–the first phase of development includes the construction of a new passenger terminal building, built in two parts, along with a utility block, a parking space, a sewage treatment plant, rainwater harvesting facilities and other ancillary structures.

The new terminal initially covered an area of 12,950 m^{2} (139,400 sq ft), was capable of handling 1,800 passengers during peak hours and about 2 million passengers annually, which now increased to an area of 42,776 m^{2} (460,440 sq ft), an apron capable of handling 20 Airbus A320 and Boeing 737 type aircraft, and is able to handle 3,240 passengers during peak hours and 4.7 million passengers annually, thereby expanding the capacity of the airport by eightfold. The new terminal building has a concourse, check-in areas, security hold and arrival lounge on the ground floor, security hold at first floor, and various offices on the mezzanine floor.

It is equipped with 36 check-in counters, which now increased to 48, four conveyor belts, 12 baggage X-ray machines, self-check-in kiosks, in-line baggage screening facilities, retail and commercial spaces covering an area of about 7,000 m^{2} (75,000 sq ft) and a parking space capable of accommodating 500 vehicles.

As per the plan, the second phase of the development work would include shifting of operations from the existing terminal building to the new one, and construction of the remaining portion of the terminal building, by demolishing the erstwhile terminal, along with the integration of all of the services. The first phase of the project was completed and inaugurated by Minister of Civil Aviation, Jyotiraditya Scindia, on 7 October 2021, and the second phase was inaugurated by Chief Minister Pushkar Singh Dhami and Jyotiraditya Scindia on 14 February 2024.

== Airlines and destinations ==
Airlines	Destinations
Air India	Delhi, Mumbai
Air India Express	Ahmedabad, Bengaluru, Mumbai-Shivaji
Alliance Air	Pantnagar, Pithoragarh
IndiGo	Ahmedabad, Bengaluru, Delhi, Hyderabad, Jaipur, Kolkata, Lucknow, Mumbai, Navi Mumbai, Noida, Pune, Srinagar

== See also ==
- List of airports in India
- UDAN Scheme
- Garhwal
- Tourism in Uttarakhand
