= Dhumku =

- city
- Location in Uttarakhand, India Dhumku (India)
- Coordinates: 31°06′13″N 78°58′25″E
- Country: India
- State: Uttarakhand
- District: Uttarkashi
- Elevation: 3,245 m (10,646 ft)

Languages
- Time zone: UTC+5:30 (IST)
- Vehicle registration: UK
- Website: uk.gov.in

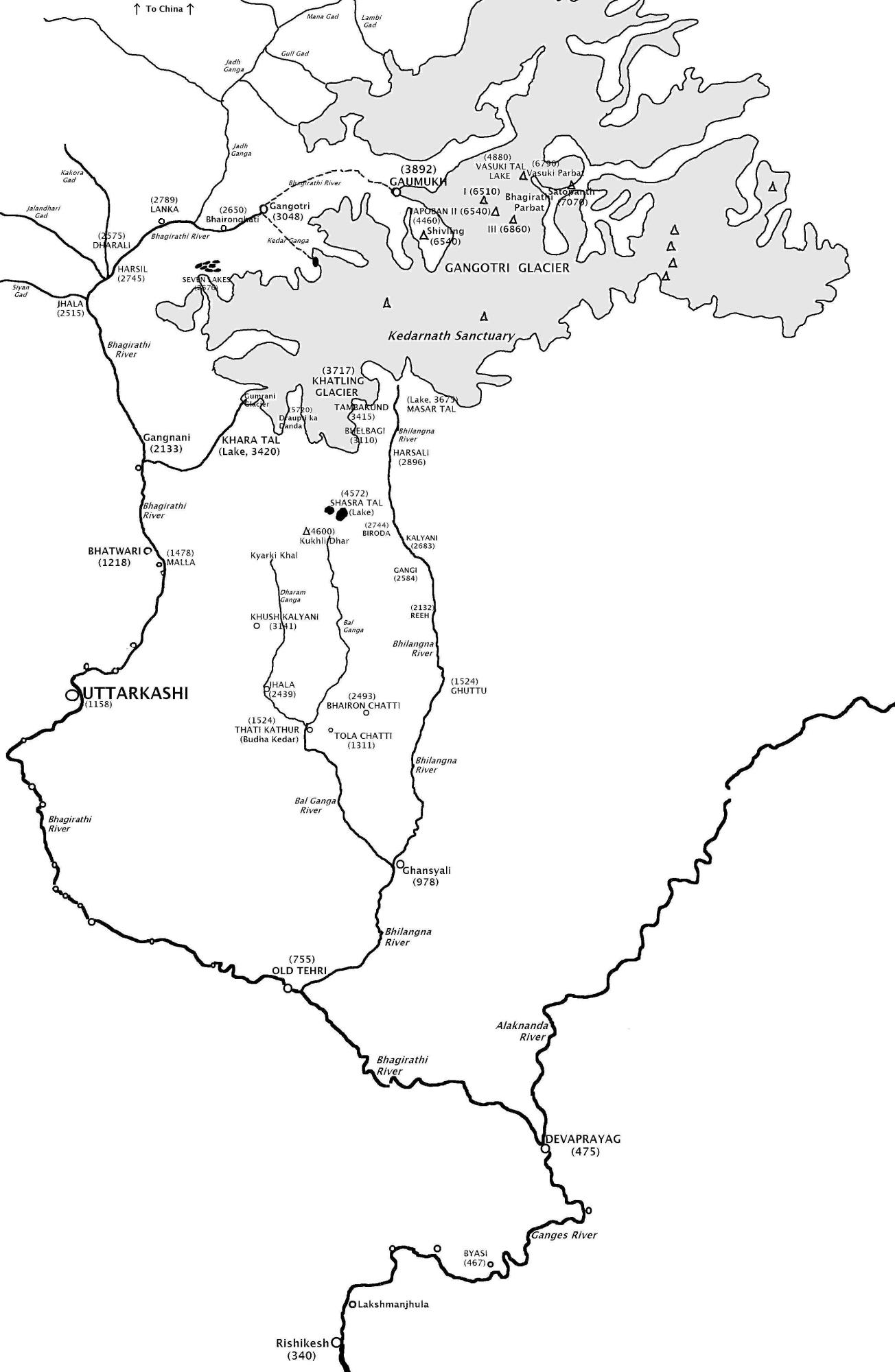
Jadh Ganga

Dhumku is a small hilly village in Uttarkashi District of Uttarakhand state of India. Jadh Ganga, an important tributary of the Bhagirathi River, flows through this place. Some of the nearby villages are Nelang (Congsa), Jadhang (Sang) and Pulam Sumda, which all lie in the valley of the Jadh Ganga (claimed by China and controlled by India).

== Geography ==
See also: Geography of Dhumku, Nelang, Pulam Sumda, Sumla and Mana Pass area and Geography of Mana.

== History ==
=== Territorial dispute ===
The valley of the Jadh Ganga is claimed by China and controlled by India.

== Culture ==
This area is inhabited by the Char Bhutia tribe who practice Tibetan Buddhism.

== See also ==
- India-China Border Roads
- Line of Actual Control
- List of disputed territories of India
