= Jad =

JAD or Jad may refer to:

- JAD (file format), Java Application Descriptor
- Jad (given name)
- JAD (software), a Java Decompiler
- Jamaah Ansharut Daulah, an Indonesian terrorist organization
- JAD Records
- Jad language
- Jad people of India
- Jad Wio, a French rock band
- Jád, the Hungarian name for Livezile Commune, Romania
- Jandakot Airport, IATA airport code "JAD"
- Joint application design (JAD), a process of collection of business requirements to develop a new information system

== See also ==
- Yad
