= Frederick Wilson (Raja) =

British settler in the Himalayas

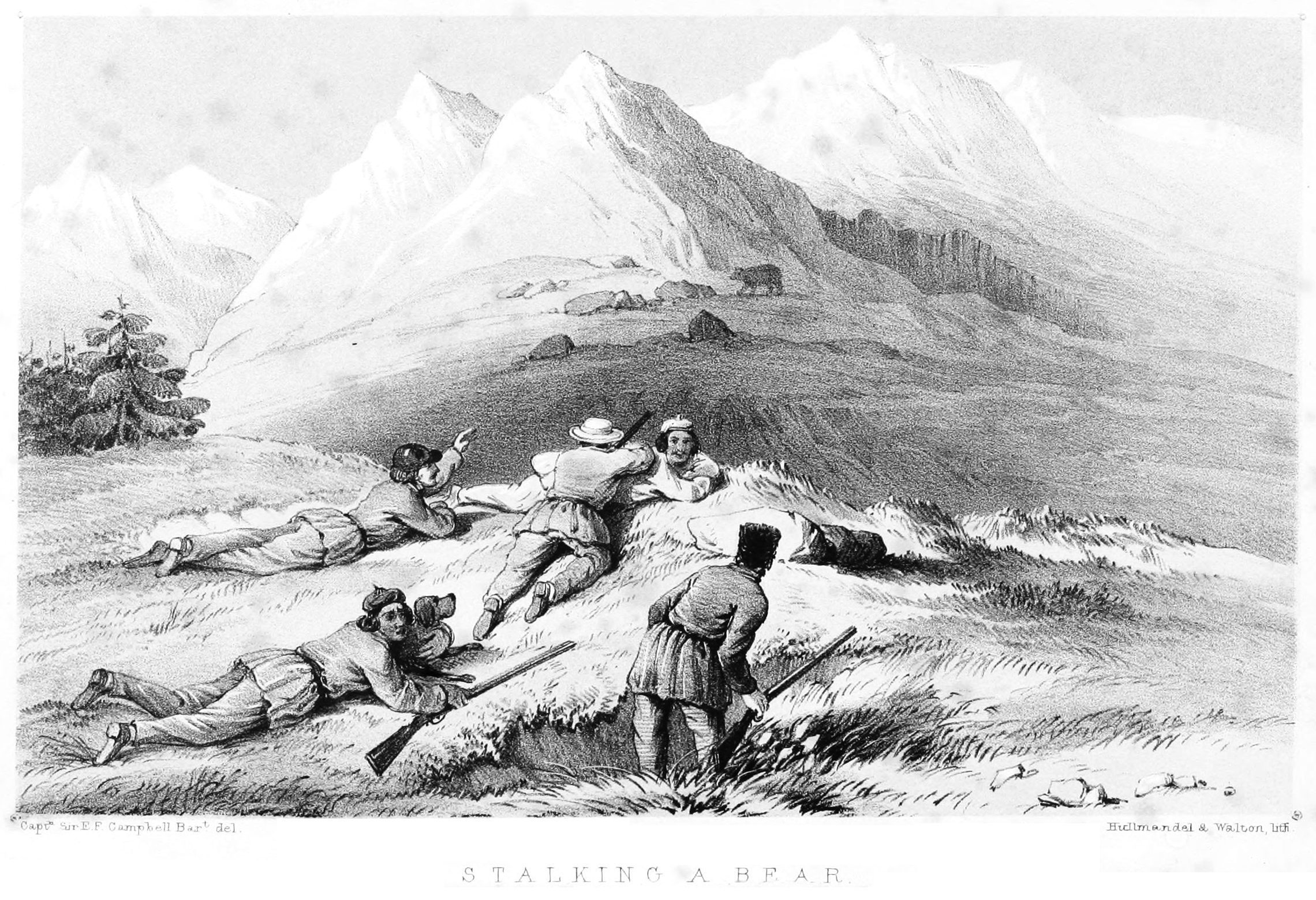
Frederick Wilson (black cap and crossed legs) with Colonel Markham hunting a bear in the Himalayas as depicted by Sir Edward Campbell, 2nd Baronet

Frederick Wilson (21 January 1817 – 21/22 July 1883) also known as Raja of Harsil, Pahari Wilson or Shikari Wilson was a British sportsman, army deserter, and settler in the Himalayas. He was a keen hunter and naturalist who wrote in sporting magazines under the pen-name "Mountaineer". He obtained the rights to lands around Harsil from the local rule and was involved in cutting down trees to supply the early railways in India with sleepers. He was treated as a local king in the Harsil region, and even minted a currency of his own. It has been claimed that Rudyard Kipling's story The Man Who Would Be King was based on him.

== Biography ==
=== As British soldier ===
Wilson came from Wakefield, Yorkshire to India after joining the East India Company as a private in 1836. He deserted the army after the First Anglo-Afghan War (1838-39) for reasons unknown and moved into the Bhagirathi valley, owning only a brown bess.

=== As agent of Raja of Tehri ===
He hunted and sought rights to kill musk deer which was denied but he was instead given timber harvesting rights from Sudarshan Shah, the Raja of Tehri in 1859. The forest lease of the Taknore Pargana was also accompanied by an appointment as the Raja's agent to repopulate the area, which had been abandoned after Gurkha occupation, by getting Jad people from Kunawar to settle at Nelang valley in a place that was called Jadang.

Here, Wilson cut down the forests of deodar and sal to meet the timber demand especially for sleepers in the growing railways in India. Prior to this Wilson made money from hunting, selling musk from musk deer and the plumes of monals (he averaged 1500 monal skins a year over 30 years) and other pheasants for the plume trade. He became very wealthy and for a while went by the name of the Raja of Harsil and minted his own coinage that could be exchanged for other currency. He had control over the people he helped resettle in the area. The Bhotiya jad people who settled often brought Garhwal girls to work in homes and lived virtually under slavery. This practice was brought to an end by Wilson.

=== Marriage and offspring ===
He married a local woman named Raimata and when she did not have children, he married her aunt, her father Mungetu's sister Gulabi or Gulabi Ruth (originally Sangrami Chand, 1828-1894, from Mukhba). Through Gulabi, he had three children, Nathaniel, Charles, and Henry.

His son Nathaniel, locally known as Nathu who took over control in the region took some women at gun point to his estate and began to shoot people who approached. This led to a local uprising and ultimately the removal of Nathu and Indri (Henry). Their fate is unknown and it has been suggested that they died either in captivity under the Raja of Tehri or drowned in a flash flood.

Frederick later moved in to live with the English gentry in Mussoorie, living also at Astley Hall in Dehra Dun, and investing in a hotel named after Charles as Charleville which is now part of the Lal Bahadur Shastri National Academy of Administration (LBSNAA). In April 1880, he was washed off in a flash flood and several newspapers announced his disappearance. A week later, he managed to make his way back home.

=== Death ===
Wilson died from complications of gout and bronchitis during the night of 21 July 1883. A funeral was held on Monday with a very large turnout. He was buried in the Camel's Back cemetery under a deodar.

== Legacy ==
=== Publications ===
Frederick Wilson wrote in his younger days on his hunting exploits in the periodicals India Sporting Review and Calcutta Sporting Review edited by James Hume. These notes went under the pen-name "Mountaineer" and he was widely viewed as an expert on the Himalayan game birds. Some of Wilson's notes were recompiled by James Hume as a book A Summer Ramble in the Himalayas and his notes were used by Colonel Markham in Shooting in the Himalayas.

=== Deforestation ===
Wilson's deforestation was criticized during his lifetime by W.E. Brooks in Stray Feathers, the birding periodical edited by A. O. Hume, and this criticism was responded to by Wilson himself. In the 20th century, the conservationist Sundarlal Bahuguna considered Wilson as the original cause of deforestation in the region.

=== Inspiration for the stories of Ruskin Bond and Rudyard Kipling ===
Ruskin Bond wrote a story called Wilson's Bridge based on a bridge across the Bhagirathi that Wilson had built. Bond knew the last descendant, Geoffrey Wilson, son of Charles.

Rudyard Kipling stayed in Charleville and likely heard the story of Wilson there and came up with the story of the Man who would be king.

=== Frederick's coins ===
In 1938, Jack Gibson found that his porters were gambling with counters that turned out to be Wilson rupee coins and collected a couple of them.

=== Introduction of apple to Harsil ===
The apple variety that he introduced into the Harsil area continues to be in cultivation.

In 1997, the large wooden Wilson Cottage at Harsil burned down.

== Gallery ==
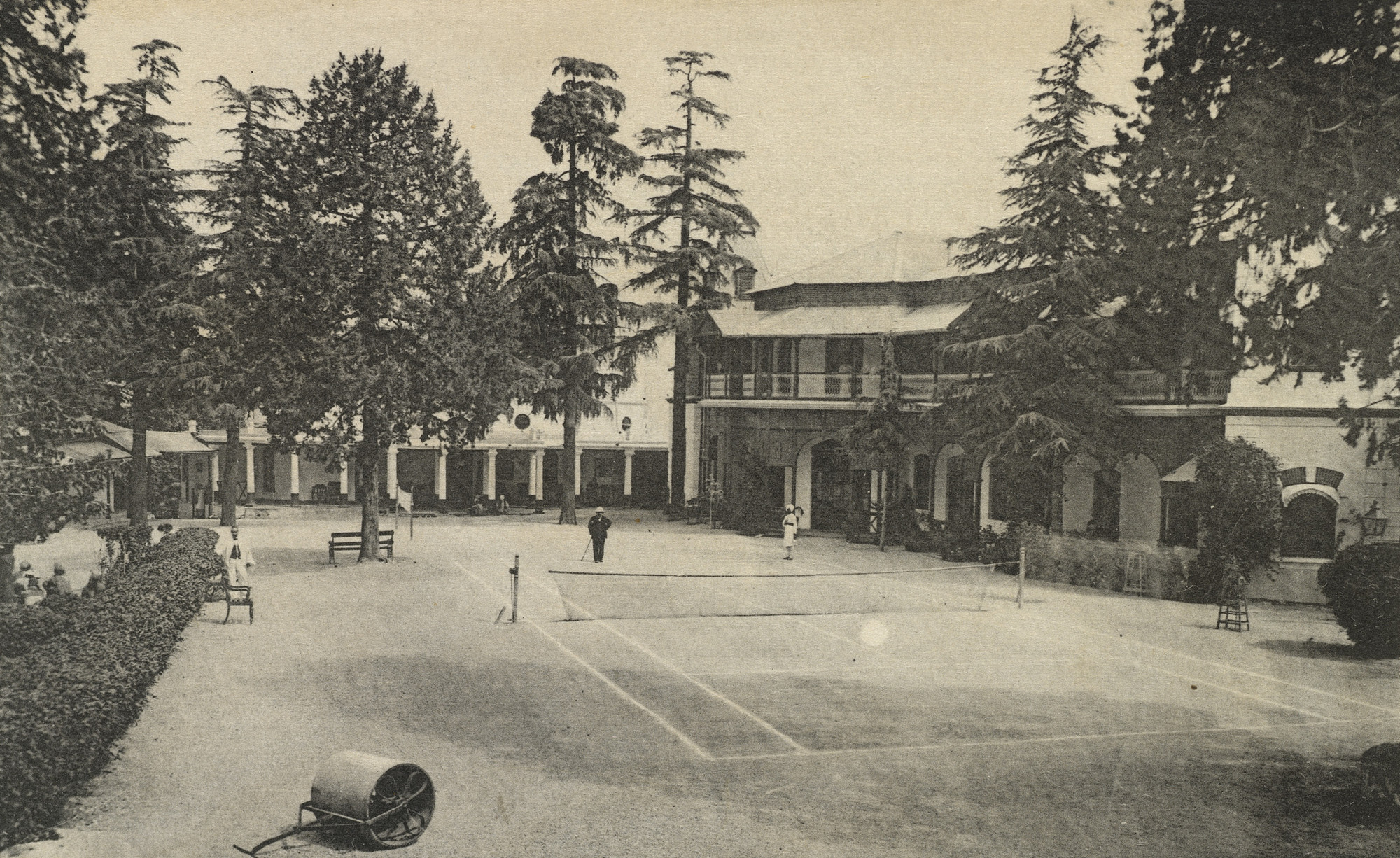
Charleville Hotel, c. 1905, once owned by Frederick Wilson, now part of Lal Bahadur Shastri National Academy of Administration.

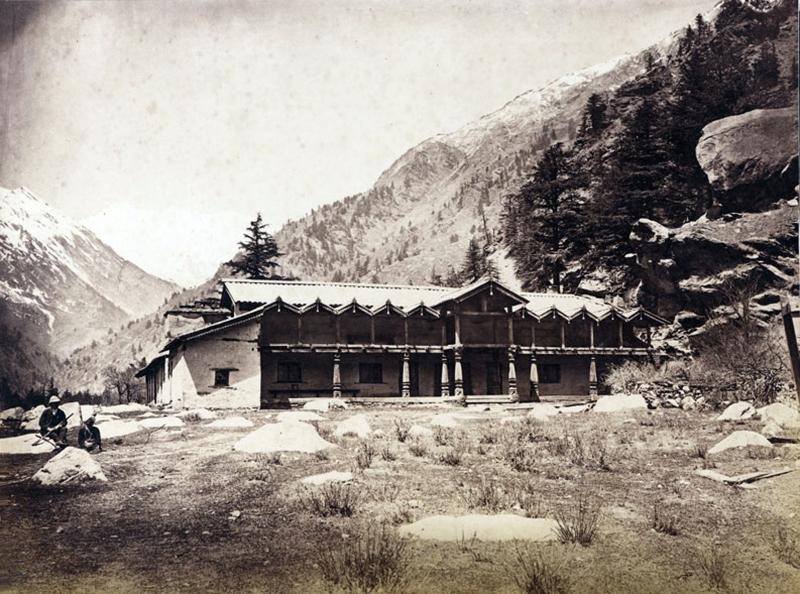
Wilson Cottage bungalow in Harsil, c. 1860. Wilson is seated to the left with his brother-in-law Mungetu Chand.

== See also ==
- George Thomas (soldier)
- James Skinner (East India Company officer)
- Walter Reinhardt Sombre
