= Dharasu =

- town
- Location in Uttarakhand, India Dharasu (India)
- Coordinates: 30°38′0″N 78°19′0″E
- Country: India
- State: Uttarakhand
- District: Uttarkashi
- Elevation: 1,339 m (4,393 ft)

Languages
  - Official: Hindi, Garhwali
- Time zone: UTC+5:30 (IST)
- PIN: 246162
- Vehicle registration: UK 10
- Coastline: 0 kilometres (0 mi)
- Website: uk.gov.in

Dharasu is a town, near Uttarkashi in Uttarkashi district, Uttarakhand, India.

== Geography ==
It is located at an elevation of 1339 m above MSL. The Dharasu Power Station is located there, on the Bhagirathi River.

== Location ==
National Highway 108 originates at Dharasu. National Highway 94 passes through the town.
