= Barkot, Uttarakhand =

Barkot
- town
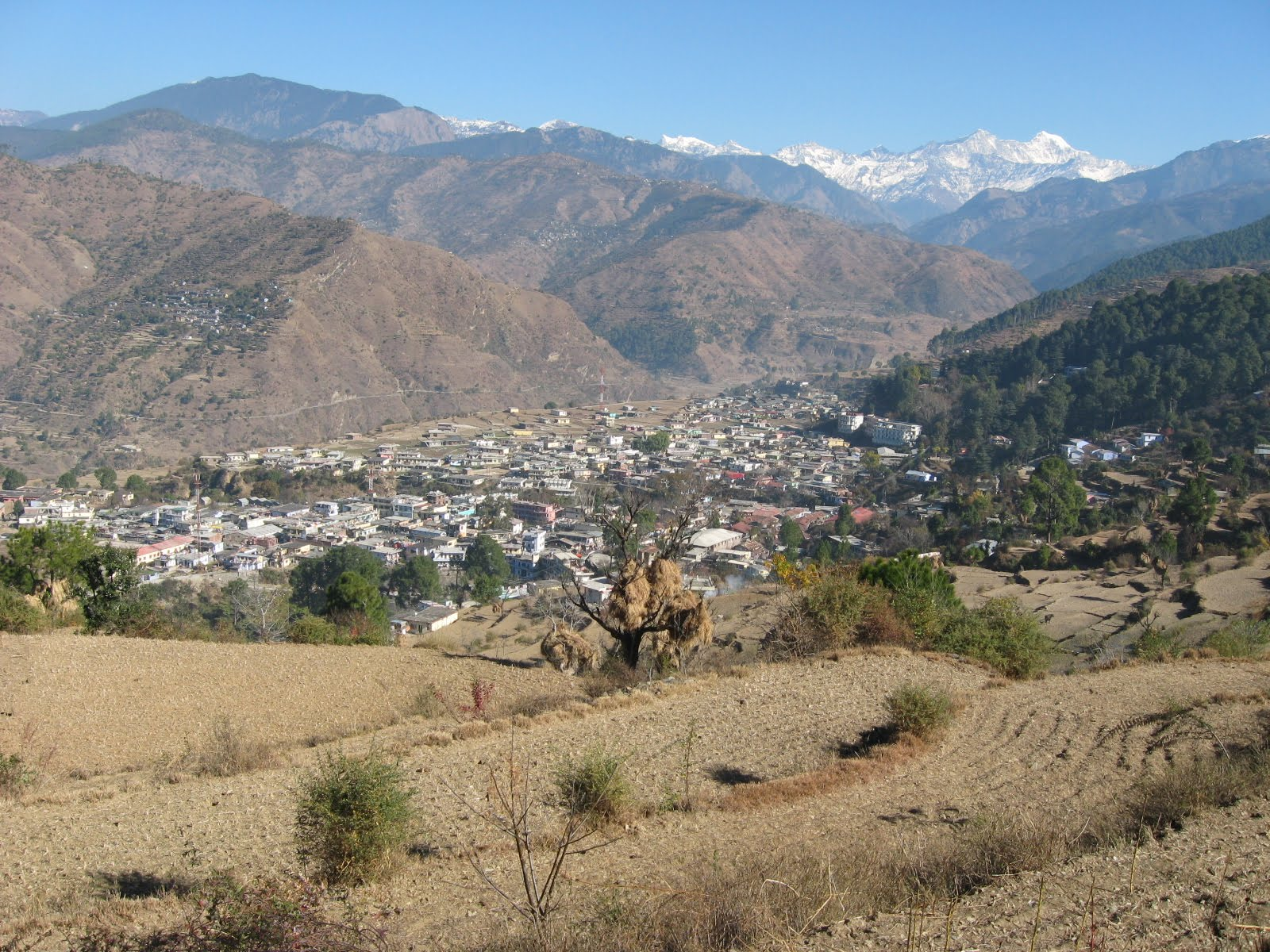

- Location in Uttarakhand, India Barkot (India)
- Coordinates: 30.82°N 78.20°E
- Country: India
- State: Uttarakhand
- District: Uttarkashi

Area
  - Total: 6 km^{2} (2.3 sq mi)
- Elevation: 1,220 m (4,000 ft)

Population (2012)
  - Total: 16,568
  - Rank: 28
  - Density: 2,500/km^{2} (6,500/sq mi)
- Time zone: UTC+5:30 (IST)
- Postal code: 249141
- Vehicle registration: UK
- Website: uk.gov.in

Barkot is a town and nagar palika near Uttarkashi, Uttarkashi District in the state of Uttarakhand, India. It is located on the banks of the Yamuna river. Tiladi Sera village in the tehsil was the location of the infamous Tiladi massacre in 1930.

== Geography ==
Barkot is located at 30.82°N 78.20°E. It has an average elevation of 1,220 metres (4,003 feet).

Barkot is located on the bank of Yamuna river.

== Demographics ==
As of the 2001 India census, Barkot had a population of 16,568. Males constitute 53% of the population and females 47% Barkot has an average literacy rate of 84.5%, higher than the national average of 74%; with 93% of the males and 77% of females literate. 54% of the population is under 6 years of age.
