= Jadh Ganga =

River in Uttarakhand, India

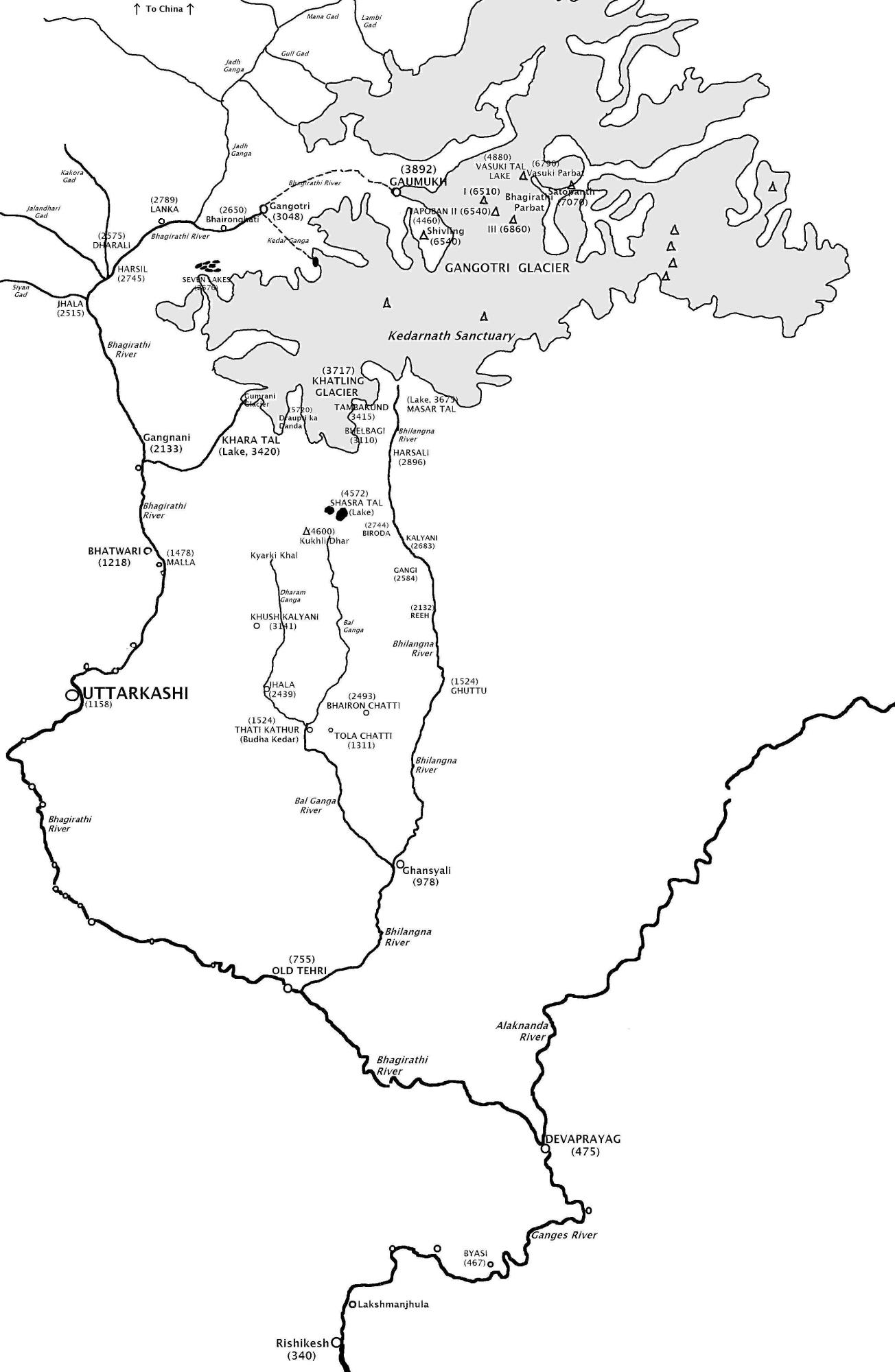
Jadh Ganga

Jadh Ganga (Hindi: जाध गंगा), also called the Jahnavi River, is a tributary of the Bhagirathi River in the Uttarakhand state of India.

== Course ==
Jadh Ganga rises north of Mana Pass from the Lambi glacier, where the river is known as Lambi Gad (Lambi River). Though administered by India, this area lies near the Line of Actual Control, the disputed de facto border between India and China, and is also claimed by China as part of Zanda County of Tibet.

Lambi Gad flows from south to north, and after it takes a westward turn it is called the Mendi Gad ('Mendi River, also Mana Gad or Mana River). The Mendi Gad continues west and at around 3 km converges with a south-to-north flowing rivulet which originates from the Surali Bamak glacier in the south; at 5 km with another south-to-north flowing rivulet from the Tara Bamak glacier in the south; at 7 km with the south-to-north flowing Gull Gad (Gull River), originating from the Mana Bamak glacier in the south; and at 15 km with the northeast-to-southwest flowing Nilapani Gad (Nilapani River), which originates from the Nilapani Bamal glacier in the northeast.

After this last confluence, the Mendi Gad is known as the Nilapani Gad, which continues another ~5 km west and converges with the northeast-to-southwest flowing Jadhang Gad (Jadhang river) at Naga. Sites along the Jadhang River include Jadhang (Sang), Pulam Sumdo, Jadhang Peak (5290 m), Sonam Peak, (5262 m), Tirpani, Pulam Sumda, Tsangchok, and Sumla near the LAC.

After the Naga, the river is known as Jadh Ganga till it exits the Nelang valley, after which it is also known as the Jahanvi River. The Jahanvi River (Gadh Ganga) then converges with the Bhagirathi River at Bhaironghati just west of Gangotri.

== Territory dispute ==
The valley of Jadh Ganga is claimed by China, though the whole extent of Jadh Ganga is administered by India.

Some of the villages in the area are Sang, Jadhang, Nelang and Pulam Sumda, all of which lie in the valley of the Jadh Ganga.

== See also ==
- Geography of Jadh Ganga and tributaries
- India-China Border Roads
- Line of Actual Control
- List of disputed territories of India
