= Bhaironghati =

- City
- Location in Uttarakhand, India
- Coordinates: 31.0097°N 78.8793°E
- Country: India
- State: Uttarakhand
- District: Uttarkashi
- Elevation: 2,806 m (9,206 ft)

Languages
- Time zone: UTC+5:30 (IST)

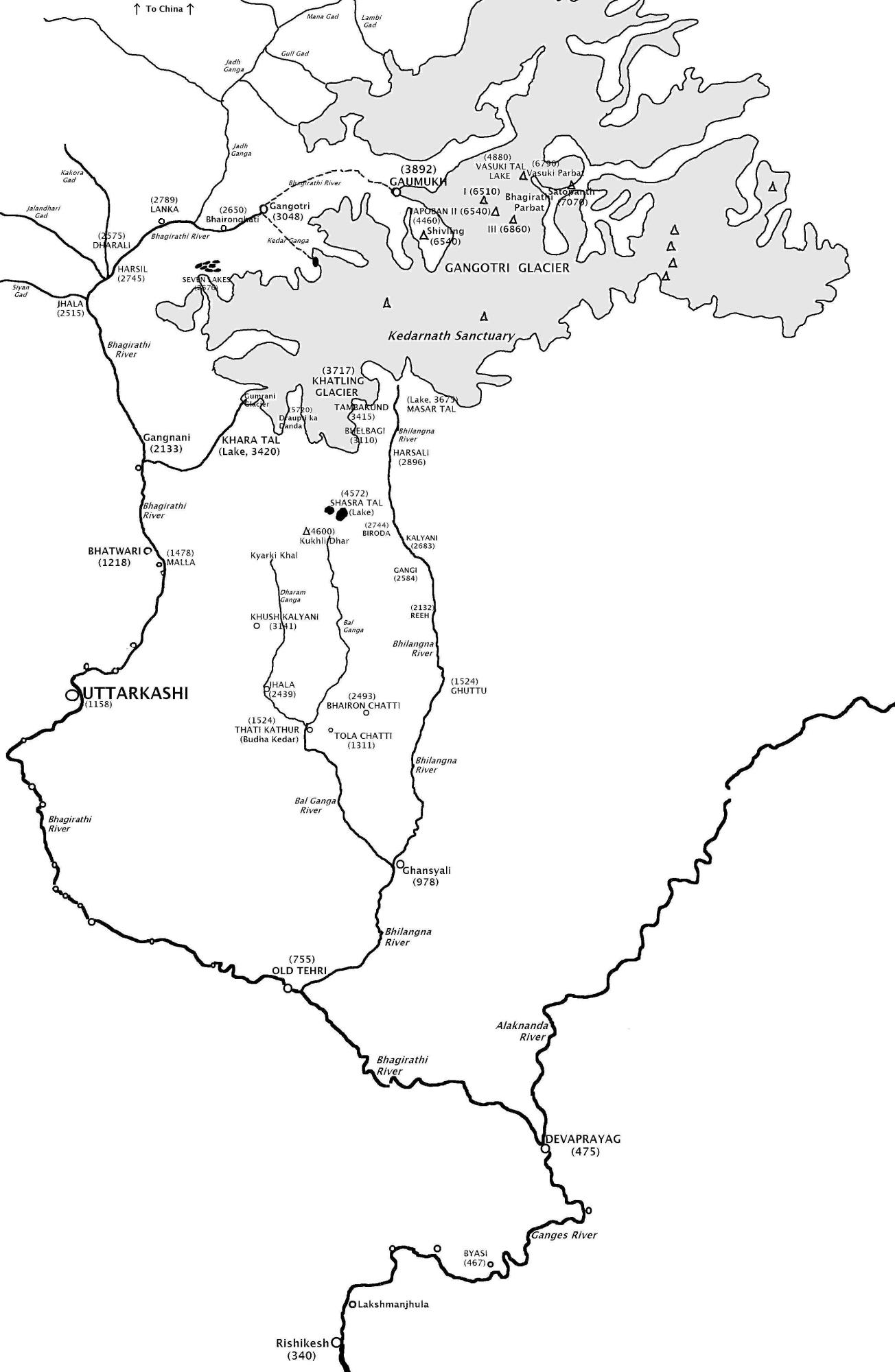
Jadh Ganga

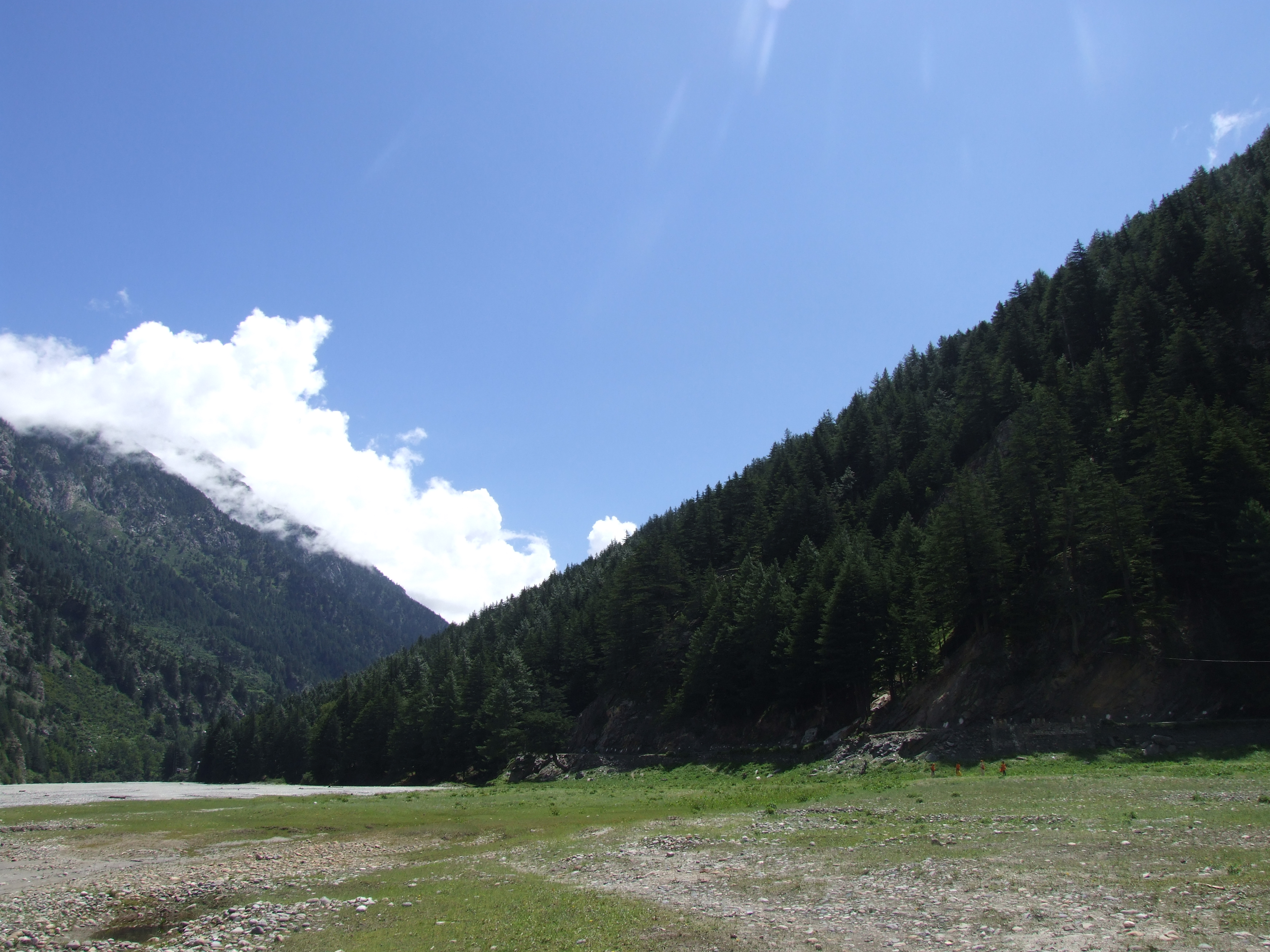
Ganges below Gangotri, near Bhaironghati

Bhaironghati is a small settlement at the juncture of the Jadh Ganga and Bhagirathi Rivers in the mountains of northern India. It is located in the Uttarkashi district of the Indian state of Uttarakhand.

Set between the river banks, there is a rock called Jadh Ganga Gorge. This rock is located beneath a girder bridge of National Highway 108 (NH 108). The old ropes and moorings of the 1800s could be viewed here until the 1970s.
