= Sang, Uttarakhand =

Sang Jadhang
- village
- Location in Uttarakhand, India Sang (India)
- Coordinates: 31°09′31″N 79°03′38″E
- Country: India
- State: Uttarakhand
- District: Uttarkashi
- Elevation: 3,727 m (12,228 ft)

Languages
  - Official: Hindi
  - Native: Bhotia
- Time zone: UTC+5:30 (IST)
- Vehicle registration: UK
- Website: uk.gov.in

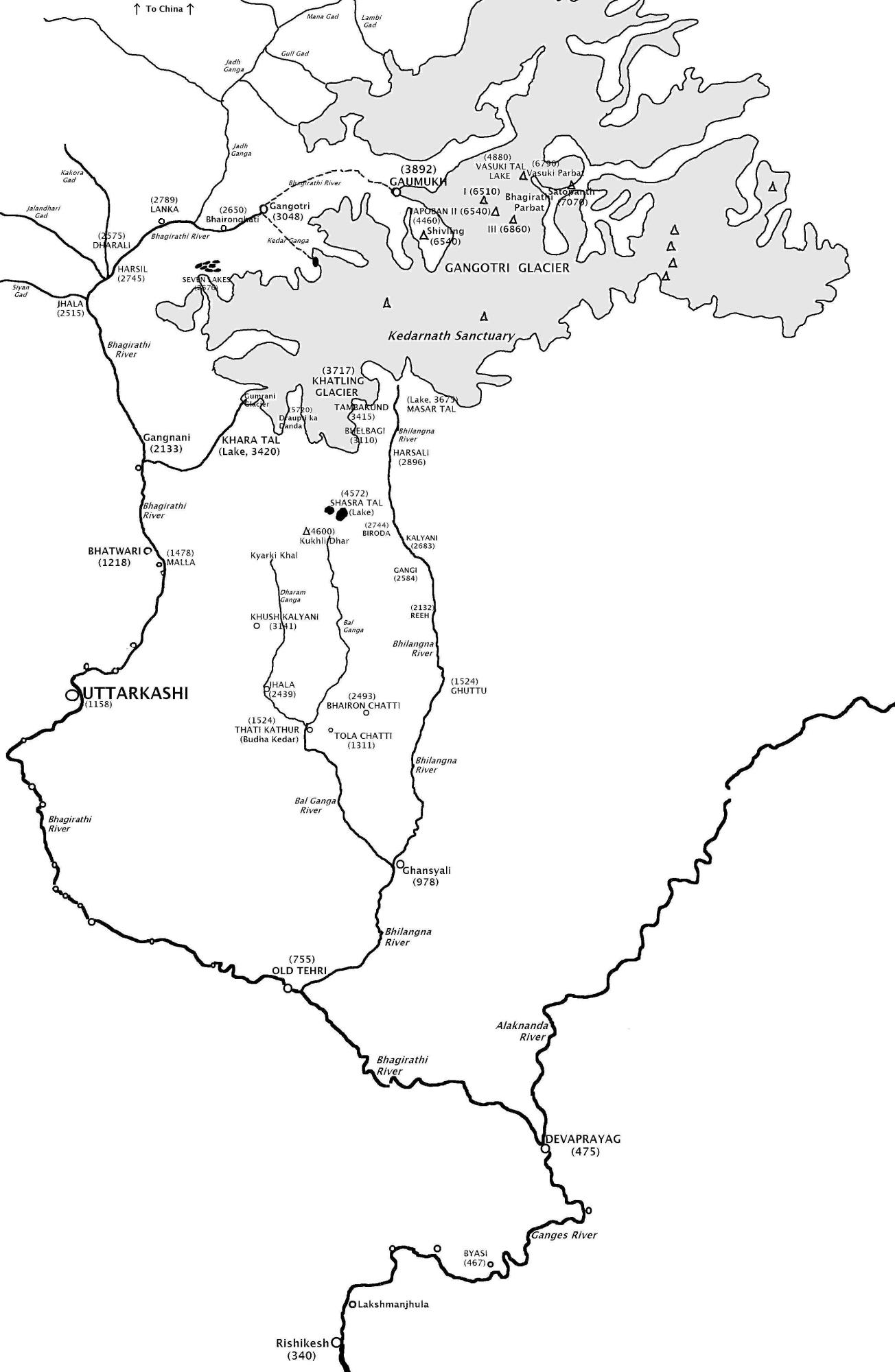
Jadh Ganga

Sang (Jadhang) is a small hilly village in Uttarkashi District, Uttarakhand, India, and claimed by Zanda County, Ngari Prefecture, Tibet, China. A tributary of the Jadh Ganga, itself an important tributary of the Bhagirathi River, flows through this place.

Mana Pass and some of the nearby villages are Tirpani, Nelang and Pulam Sumda, which all lie in the valley of the Jadh Ganga.

To boost the astrotourism in India, the government is setting up an observatory here under the Vibrant Villages programme.

== Geography ==
See also: Geography of Dhumku, Nelang, Pulam Sumda, Sumla and Mana Pass area and Geography of Mana.

== History ==
=== Etymology ===
Jadhang village itself and Jad people living in Jadhang and Nelang valley are named after a man "Jadha" who was resettled here by British adventurer Frederick Wilson. The settlement document of Garhwal Kingdom, which administered this area, from that era reads, "Wilson invited certain Jadha from the upper Pargana of Kunawar in Bashahr state (now in Himachal Pradesh) to settle at Nilang, re-establish the hamlet of Jadhang and administered the area on behalf of Maharaja Bhavani Shah [r. 1859-71 CE]."

=== 1849 CE: Resettlement ===
On 23 May 1849 CE, the king of Garhwal Kingdom, Sudarshan Shah gave british adventurer Fredrik Wilson a forest in Taknore (Tak Naurarh) pargana for an annual lease of Rs 400 for logging the timber for supplying to railways. On the same day he was appointed as Garhwal king's representative for rehabilitating this area and it has become desolated during the 12 year Gorkha occupation (1803-15 CE).

=== Since 1962: Territorial dispute ===
The India-held valley of the Jadh Ganga river is also claimed by China.

== Culture ==
This area is are inhabited by the Char Bhutia tribe who practice Tibetan Buddhism.

== See also ==
- India-China Border Roads
- Line of Actual Control
- List of disputed territories of India
