= National Highway 108 (India, old numbering) =

Old numbering of road in India

National Highway 108

Route information
- Length: 127 km (79 mi)

Major junctions
- From: Dharasu
- To: Gangotri Dham

Location
- Country: India
- States: Uttarakhand: 127 km (79 mi)
- Primary destinations: Uttarkashi - Yamunotri

Highway system
- Roads in India; Expressways; National; State; Asian
← NH 107	→ NH 109

National Highway 108 (NH 108) connects Dharasu and Gangotri Dham in Uttarakhand. The highway is 127 km (79 mi) long and runs only in Uttarakhand.

== Route ==
- Uttarkashi
- Yamunotri

== See also ==
- List of national highways in India
- National Highways Development Project
