= Barkot =

Barkot may refer to:

- Barkot, Uttarakhand, a town in India
- Barkot, Haripur, a town in Pakistan

== See also ==
- Barkote, a town in Debagarh, Odisha, India
