= Nelang =

- village
- Location in Uttarakhand, India Nelang (India)
- Coordinates: 31°06′45″N 79°00′17″E
- Country: India
- State: Uttarakhand
- District: Uttarkashi
- Elevation: 3,819 m (12,530 ft)

Languages
  - Official: Hindi
  - Native: Bhotia
- Time zone: UTC+5:30 (IST)
- Vehicle registration: UK 10
- Website: uk.gov.in

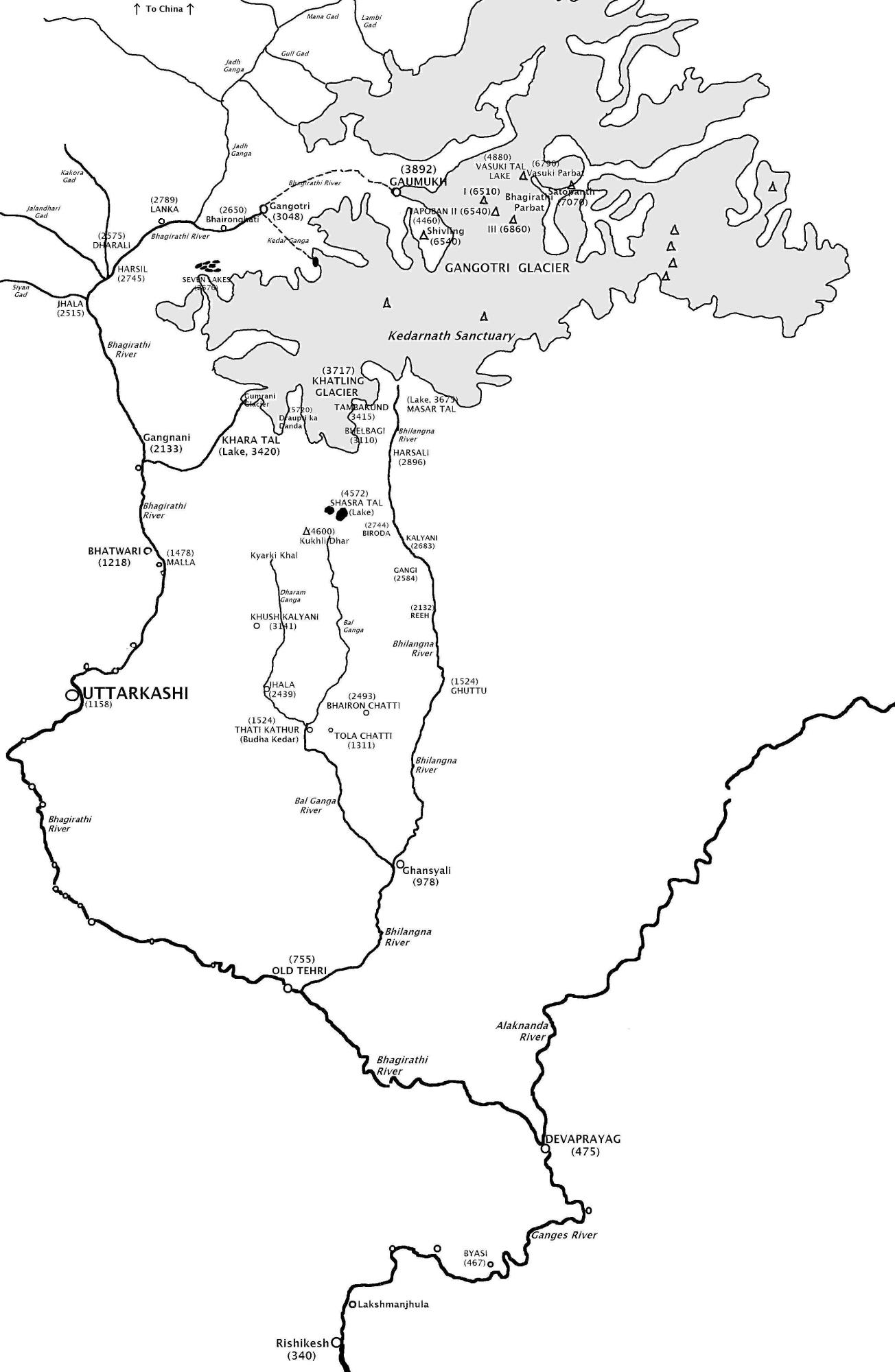
Jadh Ganga

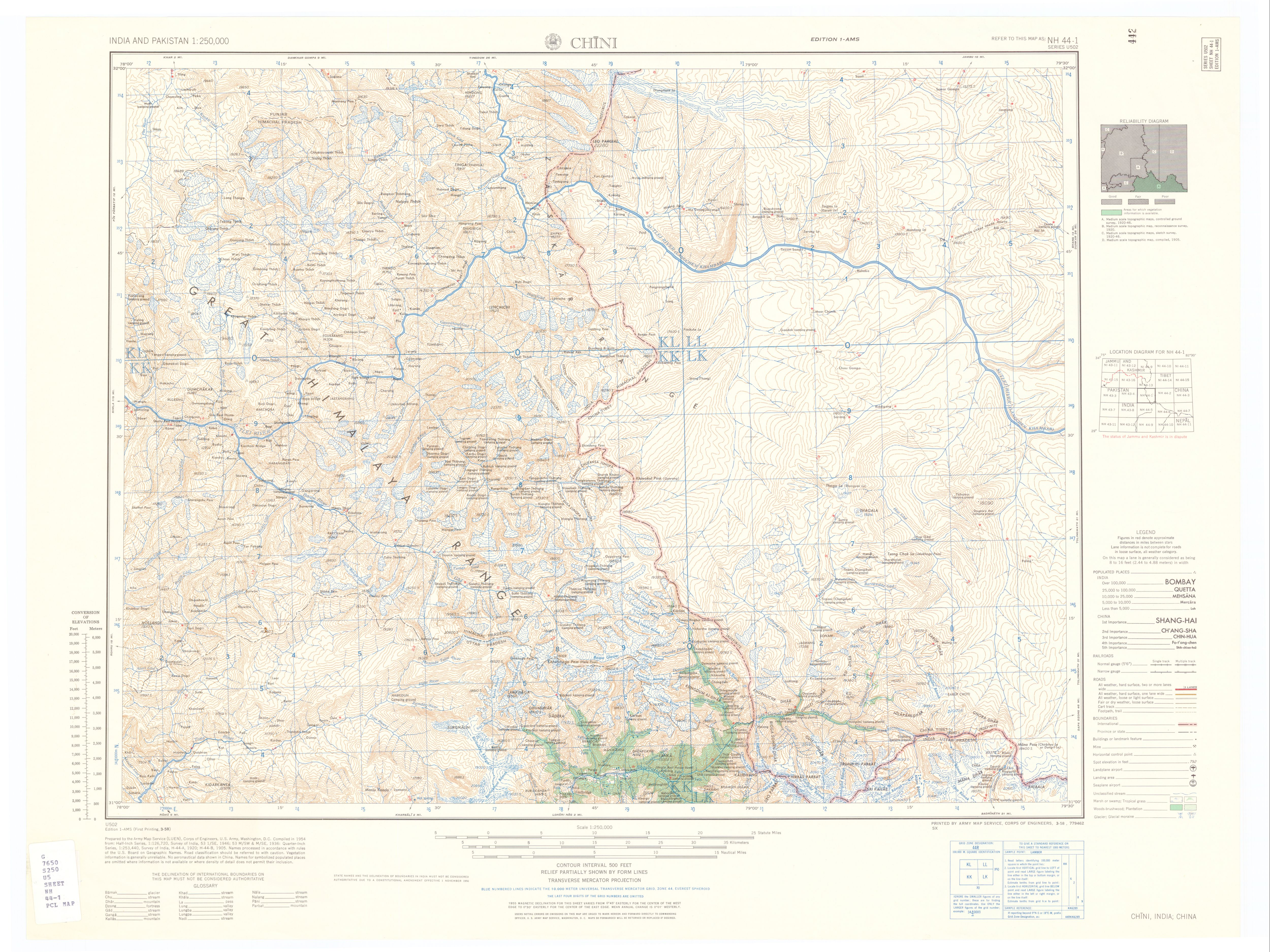
Map including Nelang (AMS, 1954)

Nelang or Nilang river valley containing a small eponymous village, part of Jadh Ganga valley of the Himalayas, in the Uttarkashi District of Uttarakhand state of India is close to the disputed Sino-Indian Line of Actual Control (LAC). This disputed area, entirely held by India, is also claimed by China as part of Zanda County of Ngari Prefecture of Tibet. It is reachable by a fork road from the NH-34 (part of Char Dham Highway).

Some of the villages near Nelang village are Dhumku in the west, and Jadhang (Sang) and Pulam Sumda in the northeast, all of which lie in the Jadh Ganga valley.

== Geography ==
The Jadh Ganga, an important tributary of the Bhagirathi River, flows through a narrow gorge flanked by steep cliffs. The gorge is called Jadh Ganga valley, and part of this valley near Nelang is called Nelang Valley.

=== Uttarkashi to Nelang-Naga ===
Uttarkashi to Nelang-Naga India–China LAC route

NH-34 from Uttarkashi city in the south to Bhaironghati (west of Gangotri) in the north via Harsil is 90 km and runs along the Bhagirathi River in the Bhagirathi valley. The Bhagirathi River and its tributary Jadh Ganga converge at Bhaironghati. The limits of the Jadh Ganga valley and Jadh Ganga river are Bhaironghati in the southwest and Naga in the northeast. A 32–km–long road along the Jadh Ganga river in the Jadh Ganga valley runs from Bhaironghati to Naga via Dhumku, Hawa Bend (~4 km from Bhaironghati, so named because of strong winds, and also notorious for landslides as it is flanked by a sandy steep vertical cliff on one side and a deep river gorge on the other), Pagal Nala (literally the "Crazy Stream" – the local name of the Jadh Ganga River, so named as it is prone to sudden flash floods whenever it rains upstream), Hindoli Ghat (so named due to the feeling of hindola or "swing" experienced by passengers on the zigzag mountain ghat route), Nelang village, Mana a bridge over the Jadhang River, and finally reaches Naga ~6 km east of Nelang.

=== Naga road forks ===
Naga - road forks into the following two directions, north along Jadh Ganga River (to Pulam Sumda and Sumla) and east along Nilapani River (to Mendi Gad Glacier)

At Naga, where the road forks into two, is the confluence of two tributaries of the Jadh Ganga, the Jadhang River (Jadhang Gad) which originates from a glacier near Sumla/Pulam Sumda in the north and the Nilapani River (Nilapani Gad) which originates from a glacier north of Mana Pass to the east. Mana Pass is not reachable via this road as this route lies to the north of the mountain and glacier, which blocks it from the pass in the south.

==== Naga to Sumla Road along Jadh Ganga River (to north) ====
Naga to Sumla, an ~34–km–long motorable road in the Jadhang river valley, goes north via Dosindhu (literally "two rivers", ~3 km from Naga, a spur road from here goes towards Jadhang village in the northwest along the Jadhang rivulet while the main road along Jadhang Gad continues northeast to Pulam Sumdo), Jadhang Peak (5290 m, west of the road) and Sonam Peak (5262 m, east of the road), Tirpani (~20 km from Naga, converging with the Rangmach River (Rangmach Gad) from the northwest and the Jadhang Gad from the northeast), Pulam Sumda (~25 km from Naga), confluence of the Jadhang Gad from the north and the Mendi Gad (another fork route goes ~2 km east to Tsangchok, base camp of BSF), and finally Sumla near the LAC where the BRO road ends at the Indian BOP (Border Out Post).

==== Naga to Mendi Gad Glacier Road along Nilapani River (to east) ====
Naga to Mana Pass: From Naga to Mana Pass road is nearly ~25 to 30–km–long. From Naga, the road goes east along the Nilapani Gad, after 5 km reaches Nilapani which is the confluence of Nilapani Gad flowing from northeast and Mana Gad (also called the Mendi Gad) flowing from east. From Nilapai confluence, the road goes ~ 13 km east along the Mana Gad to the Mana-Gull confluence where the Mana Gad from the east meets the Gull Gad from a glacier in the south. From the Mana-Gull confluence, road continues further east along the Mana Gad river towards the Mana (Mendi) glacier near the LAC. The Mana glacier lies north of Mana Pass, but remains unconnected with it due to the high mountain peaks.

=== ICBRs by BRO ===
NHAI is responsible for maintaining NH-34, which travels to Bhaironghati and Gangotri. The rest of the motorable roads to Sumla/Pulam Sumda and Mana Pass at the LAC have been constructed by India's Border Roads Organisation (BRO) under phase-I of India-China Border Roads (ICBR).

== History ==
=== Indo-Tibetan silk route ===
Salt and silk were historically traded on this silk route. Pathan traders supposedly paid for the construction of this stairway in the 17th century. It was also a lesser known secret route of Hindu-Buddhist yatra (pilgrimage) to Mount Kailash.

=== Territorial dispute ===
The valley of the Jadh Ganga is also claimed by China.

== Gartang Gali stairway ==
The Gartang Gali cliff-side hanging-stairway or Gartang Gali bridge, a 500-metre-long narrow wooden stairway hanging on the side of a vertical ridge at a height of 11,000 feet, lies in the narrow Nelang river valley of Jadh Ganga river canyon. After cutting a narrow horizontal U-shaped passage on the side of the monolithic cliff, the wooden structure was built inside it in the traditional native style. It offers great views of the Nelang valley and its ecology. It was initially supposedly constructed by the Pathan from Peshawar hired by the local traders. Gartang Gali, a narrow and steep gorge, was once used as a Silk Road trade route between Tibet and India. After the 1962 Sino-Indian War, access to the area was prohibited by the Indian military, and consequently the bridge fell into disrepair. In 2015, after India opened these areas for tourism, the wooden stairway was repaired in the native traditional style and reopened in August 2021 after a gap of 59 years.

== Culture ==
Nelang and Jadhang villages are inhabited by the Jadh Bhutia tribe, who practice both Hinduism and Buddhism. During the 1962 Sino-Indian War, India evacuated these villages.

== See also ==
- India-China Border Roads
- Line of Actual Control
- List of disputed territories of India
