= Jad people =

Ethnic group in India

The Jad people are a semi-nomadic tribe living in the Great Himalayas mountain range in the Himachal Pradesh and Uttarakhand states of India. They are primarily settled in the bordering region of Uttarakhand (Uttarkashi district), Himachal Pradesh (Kinnaur district) and Tibet. They mainly practiced sheep rearing and were shrewd traders trading with Tibet. They were also recognised as the rulers of the Gartang Garh (one among the 52 Garhs or forts of the Garhwal Kingdom). They were entrusted by the King of Garhwal with the important strategic task of securing the borders of Garhwal Kingdom from the Bushahr kingdom of Himachal and the Tibetan Empire.

The language they speak is critically endangered almost endemic to India. The language shares some similarities to the Kinnauri and Spiti languages, which are also in the Tibeto-Burman language family.

The famous tourist attraction Gartang Gali is near their village of Sang, Uttarakhand.

== Etymology ==
Jadhang village itself and the Jad people living in Jadhang and Nelang valley had been primitive settlers of this area. At the time of founding of Garhwal Kingdom in 823 AD to mid of 19th century this area i.e. Taknaur was under the control of Jadh Bhotia people. The settlement document of the Garhwal Kingdom, which administered this area, from that era reads, "Wilson invited certain people from the upper Pargana of Kunawar in Bashahr state (now in Himachal Pradesh) to settle at Harsil, re-establish the hamlet of Jadhang [r. 1859-71 CE] after it was destruction by the Gorkhas"

== Social status ==
As of 2001, the Jad people were classified as a Scheduled Tribe under the Indian government's reservation program of positive discrimination.

== See also ==
- Gartang Garh
