= Pulam Sumda =

- village
- Location in Uttarakhand, India Pulam Sumda (India)
- Coordinates: 31°18′23″N 79°07′50″E
- Country: India
- State: Uttarakhand
- District: Uttarkashi
- Elevation: 4,313 m (14,150 ft)

Languages
  - Official: Hindi
  - Native: Bhotia
- Time zone: UTC+5:30 (IST)
- Vehicle registration: UK
- Website: uk.gov.in

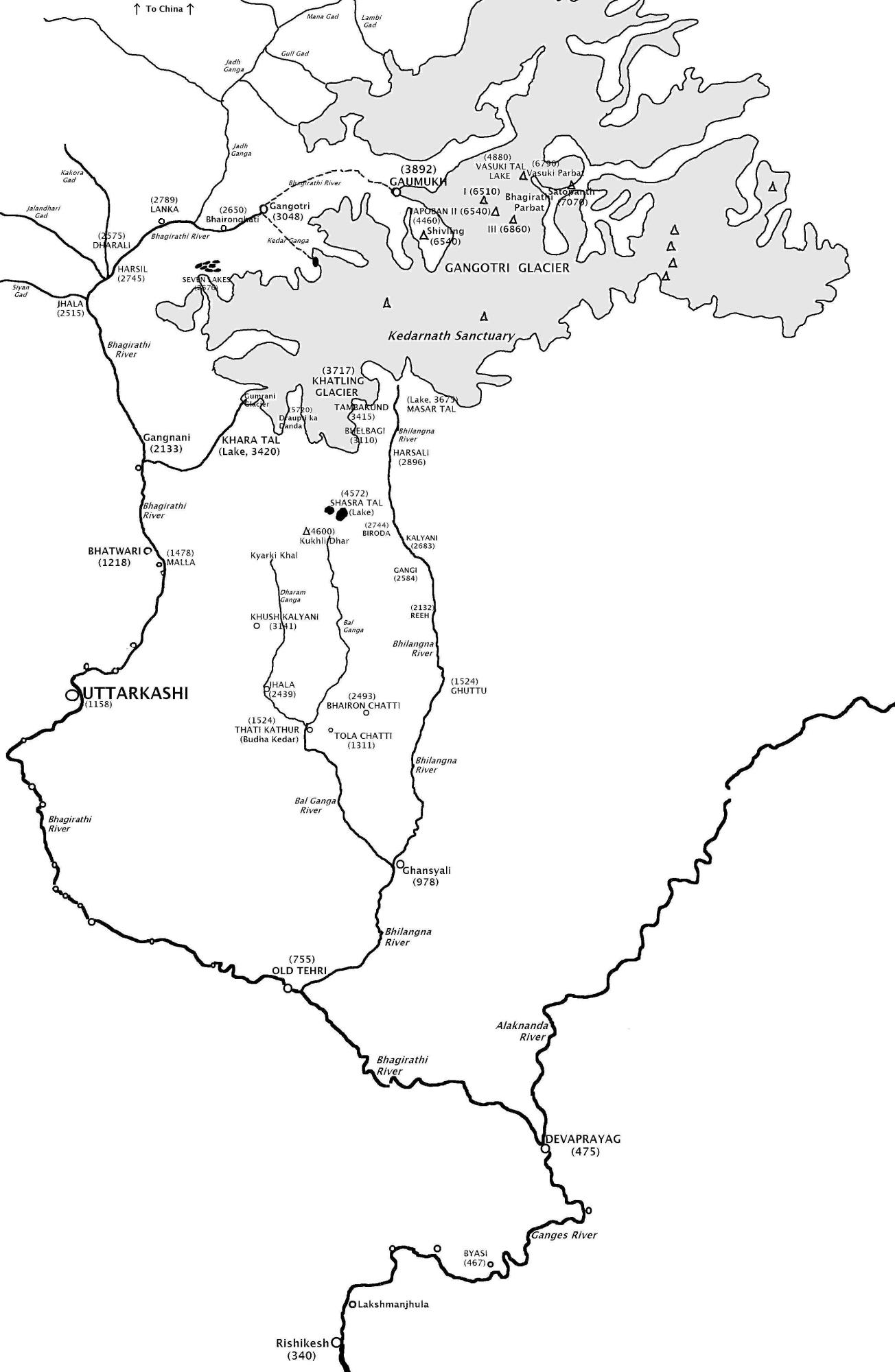
Jadh Ganga

Pulam Sumda is a small hilly village which lies in Uttarkashi District, Uttarakhand, India.

Pulam Sumda is a part of Uttarkashi District, Uttarakhand, India, and claimed by Zanda County, Ngari Prefecture, Tibet, China. The Jadh Ganga, an important tributary of the Bhagirathi River, flows through this place. Some of the nearby villages are Jadhang, Sang and Nelang, which all lie in the valley of the Jadh Ganga.

== Geography ==
Pulam Sumda has an elevation of approximately 4602.5 m (15100 ft), therefore temperatures can vary greatly. In the winter months, the temperature is an average of 5 °C (41 °F), although temperatures often drop below freezing point. During the hotter months of the year, temperatures frequently reach 30°C (86 °F)

== Culture ==
This area is inhabited by the Char Bhutia tribe who practice Tibetan Buddhism. They were part of broader trade route between India and China. They practice Tibetan Buddhism they also blended some traditions of Hinduism into their culture due to trade. They were prosperous community from early Times and were part of traditional Indo Tibetan trade route. After 1962 this area is restricted by Indian army though foreign tourist are not allowed and Indian tourist also need proper validity document and investigation from local army intelligence to travel in Pulam Sumda. Indian army played pivotal role to preserve the culture of Char Bhutia there regular festival programs and meetings are held with the help and coordination of the Indian army.

Indian Government is largely investing in this area for better connectivity because of proximity of this land to China border. Government is also providing incentives for upliftment of local people.

== See also ==
- India-China Border Roads
- Line of Actual Control
- List of disputed territories of India
