= Jad (given name) =

Jad (جاد) is a masculine given name of Arabic origin. It means "serious" or "earnest" in Arabic, and it has a secondary meaning in Hebrew, meaning "benevolent" as well.

This name can be a direct derivation of Gad from the Book of Genesis.

Notable people with the name include:

- Jad Abumrad, American radio host, composer, and creator of podcast Radiolab
- Jad Fair, American singer, guitarist, graphic artist, and founding member of lo-fi alternative rock group Half Japanese
- Jad Noureddine, Lebanese professional footballer
- Jad Saxton, American voice actress and voice director
- Jad Shwery, Lebanese pop singer, songwriter, producer and music video director

== See also ==
- Jad Wio, a French rock band
