= Tiladi massacre =

Massacre in British India

- Part of Indian independence movement
- Date: 30 May 1930
- Location: Tiladi Sera village, Rawain Valley, Uttarkashi, Tehri Garhwal State, British India
- Also known as: Rawain massacre (रेवाई हत्याकांड)
- Type: Massacre
- Motive: Suppression of protest against forest taxation and colonial forest policies
- Target: Villagers of Rawain Valley protesting forest laws
- Perpetrators: Forces of the Tehri Garhwal princely state, Diwan of Tehri, Chakradhar Juyal
- Participants: Villagers from Rawain Valley
- Deaths: 18 (official), Over 200 (local accounts)
- Injuries: Over 100

The Tiladi massacre, also known as the Rawain massacre, was the mass shooting of unarmed protesters by the princely state forces of Tehri Garhwal State on 30 May 1930. The massacre took place in a field of Tiladi village of the Rawain Valley, near present-day Barkot in Uttarkashi district, Uttarakhand, India. It occurred during the Indian independence movement, in response to local protests against repressive forest policies imposed under the British-backed Tehri Garhwal princely state. It led to the death of at least 200 villagers, with over 100 injured.

== Background ==
The Rawain Valley pargana was under the British from 1815 to 1824, but due to administrative convenience, the British later handed it over to Sudarshan Shah, then ruler of the princely state of Tehri Garhwal—a British protectorate. Due to the rapid expansion of railways in the post-1857 period, the British wanted to use the vast forest resources for free. This fast commercialisation brought them into direct conflict with the local inhabitants, as they wanted to take over reserve forests till now held as communal land by villagers, who used it for sustenance. The period between 1850 and 1930 was marked by socio-environmental upheaval in the Tehri Garhwal region.

Subsequently, in 1927–28, the Tehri State imposed forest settlements under King Narendra Shah, stripping villagers of time-honoured rights to water, grazing, fodder collection for cattle, fuelwood, and community festivals. A tax of ₹1 per head of cattle and sweeping bans on traditional use triggered growing discontent among the forest-dependent people of Rawain Valley. These regulations curtailed the traditional forest rights of local communities in Rawain Valley. Notable policies included: A tax of ₹1 per livestock head for grazing sheep and goats, Prohibitions on grazing, fodder collection, and fuelwood harvesting and Bans on local forest-based festivals and rituals. These measures disrupted agrarian life and triggered widespread resentment. In early 1930, locals organised an “Azad Panchayat”, a symbolic assertion of justice and self-governance.

20 May 1930: On 20 May 1930, in the court of Rawain pargana's Sub-divisional magistrate (SDM) Surendra Dutt, leaders of the forest rights movement, Dayaram, Rudra Singh, Ram Prasad, and Jaman Singh, were declared guilty, sentenced, and sent to Tehri Jail. But near Dandalgaon, villagers surrounded the officials. The then Divisional Forest Officer (DFO) opened fire, killing three villagers. The villagers, in turn, took the SDM hostage. Maharaja invited the representative for negotiation to Rajgarhi but got them arrested instead. This led to widespread protests in the region. Soon, people became violent to free their leaders. They captured Subdivisional Magistrate, Surendradutt, though forest officer Padmadutta Raturi managed to escape to Narendra Nagar.

== The massacre ==
On 30 May 1930, thousands of villagers assembled in the field of Tiladi Sera village near the Yamuna River in a peaceful mahapanchayat (village council) for the first time, a powerful grassroots assertion of community rights. It demanded the repeal of the forest laws, restoration of forest rights and the release of local activists who had been previously arrested. But Maharaja, via the Diwan of Tehri Garhwal State, Chakradhar Juyal, ordered Colonel Sundar Singh, the Commander of the Tehri army, to open fire on the rebels. However, Colonel Sundar Singh refused to suppress the people. As a result, Diwan Chakradhar Juyal removed him from his post, expelled him from the Tehri kingdom, and appointed Natthu Singh Sajwan as the new army chief. Subsequently, under the leadership of Natthu Singh Sajwan, on 30 May 1930, the Tehri state army troop of 300 soldiers surrounded the protestors from three sides and opened fire on the unarmed protesters at least 200 villagers (actual figures vary in different sources), with over 100 injured. Many villagers drowned while escape the gunfire by jumping into the Yamuna river, and cross over. The official death toll was 18, but some local accounts suggest 80–100 people may have died, while recent sources put the death toll to be exceeding 200. Another 194 wounded villagers were arrested; 70 were tried for sedition, and 16 reportedly died in custody. Subsequently, 65 people received various terms of imprisonment under the Sedition Act.

== Aftermath ==
The news of the Tilari massacre spread through newspapers and reached even the British government. The brutality of the massacre was likened to the Jallianwala Bagh massacre of 1919. It intensified local resistance against the princely state and contributed to the broader freedom movement in the Himalayan region.

Later, under mounting public pressure, the Maharaja Narendra Shah revoked some forest taxes and eased restrictions. However, after the protests were suppressed, the reserve forests were taken over without any compensation given to land owners, and the tree felling continued. Now that the ownership of the forest was with the Government, local society lost interest in the preservation of forests. Now they were more keen to clear out the forest and start cultivation rather than sustaining themselves meagrely as forest labourers.

== Legacy ==
A memorial commemorating the incident known as Tiladi Shaheed Smarak (Tiladi Martyrs Memorial) was constructed at the site. The massacre is commemorated annually as the annual Tiladi Martyrs’ Day observance in the Rawain region, especially at the site since 1949. Here, families of local martyrs, which included Ajit Singh, June Singh, Tulsi, Kisya, Gaur Singh, and others, are facilitated. It remains a symbol of indigenous resistance to colonial and feudal oppression. Scholars and activists continue to demand greater national recognition of the event.

Based on the incident, Vidyasagar Nautiyal published his book Yamuna ke Baagi Bete (The Rebel Sons of Yamuna, 2012), which also describes the plight of the local people during their socio-environmental struggle.

== See also ==
- Khejarli massacre
- Forest Satyagraha
- Chipko movement
- Jallianwala Bagh massacre
- Indian independence movement

== Bibliography ==
- Yamuna Ke Bagi Bete (Hindi) by Vidyasagar Nautiyal. Samayik Publisher, 2012. ISBN 8171381103
- तिलाड़ी काण्ड – उत्तराखण्ड का जालियाँवाला बाग (Hindi) Pahar.org, January 12, 2024.
