= Jad language =

Tibetic language spoken in India

Jad
- Dzad
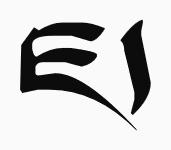
- Dzad written in Ume script
- Native to: India
- Native speakers: (300 cited 1997)
- Language family: Sino-Tibetan: Tibeto-Kanauri ?; Bodish; Tibetic; (Western Innovative); Spiti Bhoti; Jad

Language codes
- ISO 639-3: jda
- Glottolog: jadd1243
- ELP: Jad

Jad (Dzad), also known as Bhotia and Tchhongsa, is a language spoken by a community of about 300 in the states of Uttarakhand and Himachal Pradesh, in India. It is spoken in several villages, and the three major villages are Jadhang, Nelang and Pulam Sumda in the Harsil sub-division of the Uttarkashi District. Jad is closely related to the Lahaul–Spiti language, which is another Tibetic language. Jad is spoken alongside Garhwali, Mahasu Pahari, Kinnauri Pahari and Hindi. Code switching between Jad and Garhwali is very common. The language borrows some vocabulary from both Hindi and Garhwali. It is primarily a spoken language.

== Naming ==
The name Bhotia means "those from the north", referring to the geographical location of the population who speaks the language. The name Bhotia encompasses a large set of languages and is used to refer to multiple groups, Jad is specifically spoken by the Bhotias of Nelang. The term Bhotia is unrelated to the language of the people of Bhutan, which is an independent Himalayan state in the northeastern area of the subcontinent. The name Jad is derived from the summer village name, where the Jad people spend the summer season, which is called Jadhang.

== History ==
Scholarship on Jad and people has been very limited. The population has not been subjected to a thorough study or survey. Work has been scattered and of uncertain quality. As of 1977, there were two reasons for the lack of scholarship on the language and people. First, the Bhotias reside in places which are difficult to reach geographically. Secondly, security clearance must be obtained from the Home Department and Defense Department of India before scholars are allowed to visit the border where the Jad live. As a result, the amount of research that has been conducted is limited in volume and scope.

== Phonology ==
=== Vowels ===
The following table describes the location in the mouth where vowels are pronounced in Jad.

	Front	Central	Back
High	i		u
Mid	e	ə	o
Low			a

There are no diphthongs in Jad, but vowels frequently occur in sequence. There is no strong rule for which order the vowels must fall in when in a sequence, so many different orders are found in Jad.

Vowels tend to be nasalized when they follow a nasalized consonant, and glottalized when they are placed before a glottal stop.

A high tone is associated with the vowel before word-final /h/ or after word-initial retroflex and dental plosives.

=== Consonants ===
Consonants
		Bilabial	Dental	Retroflex	Palatal	Velar	Glottal
Nasal		m	n	ɳ	ɲ	ŋ	
Plosive	voiceless	p	t	ʈ	c	k	(ʔ)
Plosive	aspirated	pʰ	tʰ	ʈʰ	cʰ	kʰ	
Plosive	voiced	b	d	ɖ	ɟ	ɡ	
Plosive	breathy-voice	(bʱ)	(dʱ)	(ɖʱ)	ɟʱ	(ɡʱ)	
Fricative			s		ɕ		h
Laterals					l (lʱ)		
Rhotic			r (rʱ)	ɽ			
Semi-vowels		w			j		

The phonemic status of the breathy-voiced bʱ dʱ etc. is uncertain. They are only found at the start of the word, where there is a strong tendency for voiced plosives, nasals and liquids to be aspirated. The voiced aspirates do not, in principle, contrast with the corresponding non-aspirates. D.D. Sharma notes that there appears to be dialectal variation here, and that contrasts may found that involve loanwords, but nevertheless decides to ultimately treat them as allophones.

The glottal fricative /h/ is realised as a velar fricative /x/ between vowels: /laha/ -> [laxa] 'work'.

Most consonants can start a word, with the exception of /ɳ/ and /ɽ/. The only consonants that can appear at the end of a word are the liquid consonants (like /l/ and /r/), and the voiced plosives /b d ɡ/. Voiced consonants are usually de-voiced when in the final position of a word or coming immediately before a voiceless sound. Unvoiced plosives tend to be voiced when coming after a voiced sound. At the end of the word before a pause, /ɡ/ and /d/, and to a lesser extent other voiced consonants, tend to be glottalised: /pʰeroɡ/ -> [pʰeroʔ]. Like vowels in Jad, pronunciation of consonant sounds shifts according to the sounds surrounding the consonants.

Consonant clusters can be found in the initial and middle sections of words. At the start of the word, consonant clusters are typically of the form plosive (or fricative) + one of the semivowels /j w/: /ɡwã/ 'egg', /myabo/ 'poor', /swã/ 'new'.

=== Word structure ===
Words may be monomorphemic or polymorphemic. Words follow the following rule set:

1. Words can start with any consonant but ṇ and ṛ.
2. Native words end in a vowel, a plosive, a nasal, or a liquid consonant.
3. No native word begins or ends in a consonant cluster other than the exceptions mentioned above.
4. Normally, no aspirated consonant, breathy-voiced consonant, or semivowel ends a native word.
5. Words have a small amount of pause on either side of them in a slow tempo of speech.

Word composition is also limited by a set of permissible syllables. Permitted syllables are /V/, /VC/, /CV/, /CCV/, /CVC/, /CCVC/, and /CVCC/. These syllables can be combined to make up longer words.

== Nouns ==
In Jad, nouns act as subjects or objects of verbs. Nouns are subject to number, gender, and cases. Inanimate nouns are genderless and also are not changed for plural number. Animate nouns and human nouns have distinct mechanisms for marking gender. Pluralization is marked for human beings only. New nouns can be formed by adding new stems, reduplicating stems, or adding suffixes.

Gender is denoted in two ways. Prefixes can be added to indicate gender of living creatures, or distinct words are used for female and male counterparts. Plurals are marked on animate nouns by adding plural suffixes. Plurals can be noted on inanimate nouns by using a descriptor word to provide details about the noun, but cannot themselves be changed to represent pluralization.

Difference cases of nouns are used to describe a variety of functions. These include possession, subject, object, means, purpose, advantage, separation, origin, material composition, time, place, etc.

== Word order ==
Jad follows a structure of noun-adjective. An example is the phrase "a very black dog." In Jad, this phrase is "khi nagpo məŋpo cig", or "dog black very one." This illustrates the noun-adjective word order. It also places adjectives before degree descriptors, following an adjective-degree syntactic form. For example, the phrase "very black" in Jad would be "nagpo məŋpo" where nagpo translates as black and məŋpo translates to very.

== Script ==
The language has largely been oral. The Jad language was written using the Ume variety of Tibetan script while trading with Tibet, during the Tehri rule.

== Status ==
It is primarily a spoken language. All written communication is in Hindi. Attitudes toward Jad are negative with little institutional support. Education, media, television, and all other official sources of communication are in Hindi. There is no known literature, with the exception of a one page translation of a story about a prodigal son. It is vigorously endangered and under severe threat, and it is unclear if the current state of bilingualism and code switching will continue or if Jad will be entirely replaced by either Hindi or Garhwali.
