= Barkot, Haripur =

Coordinates: 34°11′0″N 73°4′0″E

Barkot
- Town and union council
- Interactive map of Barkot
- Country: Pakistan
- Region: Khyber-Pakhtunkhwa
- District: Haripur
- Time zone: UTC+5 (PST)

Barkot is one of the 44 union councils, administrative subdivisions, of Haripur District in Khyber-Pakhtunkhwa province of Pakistan. The town of Barkot is located at an altitude of 1379 m (4527 ft).
