= Territorial disputes of India =

Map showing disputed territories of India.

There are several disputed territories of India. A territorial dispute is a disagreement over the possession or control of land between two or more sovereign states or over the possession or control of land by a new state and occupying power after it has conquered the land from a former state no longer currently recognized by the new state.

India faces territorial issues with some of its neighbours – the People's Republic of China, Pakistan and Nepal. The dispute with China also involves the Republic of China based in Taiwan. India has resolved its un-demarcated border with Bhutan, which included multiple irregularities. India also resolved its border disputes with Bangladesh and Sri Lanka.

== Current disputes ==
=== China ===
The territorial disputes between India and China result from the historical consequences of colonialism in Asia and the lack of clear historical boundary demarcations. There was one historical attempt to set a proposed boundary, the McMahon Line, by Great Britain during the 1913-1914 Simla Convention. The Republic of China rejected the proposed boundary. The unresolved dispute over the boundary became contentious after India gained its independence and the People's Republic of China was established. The disputed borders are complicated by the lack of administrative presence in the disputed areas, which are remote.

==== Sino-Indian border ====
Two governments claim to be the legitimate Chinese government, the People's Republic of China (PRC) and the Republic of China (ROC; commonly called "Taiwan"). They do not recognise the legitimacy of each other. The PRC has actual control of its areas on the India-China border, while the ROC currently has no shared land or maritime border with India. Their views are presented below. The Line of Actual Control (LAC) is presently the operational border between India and the PRC.

==== People's Republic of China's position ====
The Depsang Plains are located on the border of the Indian union territory of Ladakh and the disputed zone of Aksai Chin. The Chinese Army controls most of the plains, while India controls the western portion of the plains. The dispute remains unresolved.

Arunachal Pradesh is a state of India created on 20 January 1972, located in the far northeast. It borders the states of Assam and Nagaland to the south, and shares international borders with Burma in the east, Bhutan in the west, and China in the north. The majority of the territory is claimed by China, by whom it South Tibet. The northern border of Arunachal Pradesh reflects the McMahon Line, a line demarcated by the 1914 Simla Convention between the United Kingdom and the Tibetan government. The Simla Convention was never accepted by the Chinese government, and it was also considered invalid by Tibetans due to unmet conditions specified in the treaty. The boundary was not broadly enforced by the Indian government until 1950. Currently, this territory is administered by India.

==== Republic of China's position ====
Throughout the Cold War, the Government of the Republic of China had the same understanding of the China-India border dispute as the PRC. In 1962, the ROC's Ministry of Foreign Affairs stated that they did not recognise the legality of the McMahon Line. The same year western countries increased pressure on the ROC leader Chiang Kai-shek to recognise the legality of the McMahon Line in order to isolate Beijing. However, Chiang dismissed the McMahon Line as an "imperialist imposition on China". In February 1987, India's move to elevate the status of "Arunachal centrally administered region" to the state of Arunachal Pradesh was declared null and void by the ROC's Ministry of Foreign Affairs. The Ministry, in a formal statement, stated that it did not recognise the "illegal occupation" of ROC territory south of the McMahon Line and that the establishment of "Arunachal Pradesh state" was an illegal act. In 1995, Ambassador Teng Pei-Yin (the ROC's first representative to India) in response to an Indian member of parliament, stated that the ROC did not recognise the McMahon Line. However, the ROC has not made any statement on the China-India dispute since.

==== Disputed areas ====
China's integrated Western Theater Command area.

The Chinese Military has an integrated Western Theater Command across the entire border with India. The Indian Military has divided the Line of Actual Control into 3 sectors – the western sector across Ladakh and the Chinese-held Aksai Chin, the central sector across Himachal Pradesh and Uttarakhand, and the eastern sector across Sikkim and Arunachal Pradesh. Similarly, the Indian Airforce has a New Delhi-based Western Air Command, a Prayagraj-based Central Air Command, and a Shillong-based Eastern Air Command with several AFS (Air Force Stations/Bases), AGL (Advanced Landing Ground airports) and helipads to cover the LAC.

List of disputed areas from west to east along the India-China border:

Disputed area	Administrative		Controlled by	Airbases / AGLs		Comments / Geostrategic context
Disputed area	India	China	Controlled by	India	China	Comments / Geostrategic context
Trans-Karakoram Tract (Shaksgam)	Ladakh (Leh district)	Xinjiang Uygur Autonomous Region	China (since 1963)	Daulat Beg Oldi		Ceded to China in 1963 by Pakistan subject to the resolution of the Kashmir dispute with India.
Aksai Chin	Ladakh (Leh district)	Xinjiang Uygur Autonomous Region	China	Daulat Beg Oldi AGL, Leh Airport		
Demchok sector	Ladakh (Leh district)	Tibet Autonomous Region (Ngari Prefecture)	India and China south and north of the Indus River respectively.	Fukche		
Chumar (2 separate noncontiguous Chumur North and Chumur South subsectors)	Ladakh (Leh district)	Tibet Autonomous Region	India	Nyoma, Padum AGL, helipad at Chumur.		
Kaurik	Himachal Pradesh (Lahaul and Spiti district)	Tibet Autonomous Region	India	Chinyalisaur Airport AGL, Pathankot Airport		
Tashigang-Shipki La	Himachal Pradesh (Kinnaur district)	Tibet Autonomous Region	India	Chinyalisaur Airport AGL, Pathankot Airport		Shipki La, with an Indian military post, is an important pass for trade.
Sang-Nelang-Pulam Sumda	Uttarakhand (Uttarkashi district)	Tibet Autonomous Region	India	Chinyalisaur Airport AGL, Pathankot Airport		Area also covers Jadhang village.
Barahoti	Uttarakhand (Chamoli district)	Tibet Autonomous Region	India	Chinyalisaur AGL, Pithoragarh Airport AGL		Area also covers Lapthal, Sangcha Malla, Silakang villages.
Arunachal Pradesh	Arunachal Pradesh	Tibet Autonomous Region	India	Tawang AFS and 7 AGLs (Aalo, Mechuka, Pasighat, Tuting, Vijoynagar, Walong, Ziro).		Most of the state is claimed by China.

Within the geostrategic context of disputes between India and China, the disputes over Doklam and the Ten Degree Channel and South China Sea shipping lanes are also relevant. Doklam is a dispute between Bhutan and China near the India-Bhutan-China tri-junction. India has sided with Bhutan in the dispute. The area is of strategic importance to all three countries. Doklam lies close to India's Siliguri "Chickenneck" Corridor where a Chinese military advance of less than 130 kilometres (81 mi) would cut off Bhutan, part of West Bengal and all of Northeast India, an area containing almost 50 million people. This scenario arose during the war between India and China in 1962. India has embarked on a slew of Northeastern India connectivity projects to create multiple alternatives to the Silliguri corridor, including through Bangladesh, National Waterways and seaports, to mitigate the risk of being cut off.

The world's busiest Sea line of communication (SLOC) passes through the Strait of Malacca and the Ten Degree Channel in the exclusive economic zone of India, a region protected by India's Andaman and Nicobar Command. It is a geostrategic choke point for China since over 94,000 merchant ships travel through every year, carrying 40% of the world's freight trade between China and other nations. US$5 trillion in annual shipping trade passes through the SLOC and choke points of Southeast Asia and the South China Sea (SCS). 80% of global trade passes through the Indian Ocean SLOC in the form of oil and natural gas critical for advanced economies. India, Australia, Japan and the United States have comprised the Quadrilateral Security Dialogue (QUAD) to contain China as part of their Indo-Pacific strategy.

=== Pakistan ===
==== Kashmir ====
The divisions of the disputed Kashmir region administered by the republics of Pakistan, India, and China.

The conflict over Kashmir is primarily between India and Pakistan, with China largely playing a third-party role. Conflict started after the partition of India in 1947, as both India and Pakistan initially claimed the entirety of the former princely state of Jammu and Kashmir. In 1963, Pakistan recognized Chinese sovereignty over the Trans-Karakoram Tract and Aksai Chin. India controls 70% of Kashmir's population and approximately 55% of its land area including Jammu, Kashmir Valley, most of Ladakh, and Siachen Glacier. Pakistan controls approximately 30% of the land including Jammu and Kashmir and Gilgit-Baltistan. China controls the remaining 15% of the land, including Aksai Chin and the mostly uninhabited Trans-Karakoram Tract, as well as part of the Demchok sector.

==== Sir Creek ====
Sir Creek is a 96 km (60 mi) tidal estuary in the uninhabited marshlands of the Indus River Delta on the border between India and Pakistan. It flows into the Arabian Sea and separates Gujarat state in India from Sindh province in Pakistan. The long-standing India-Pakistan Sir Creek border dispute stems from the demarcation "from the mouth of Sir Creek to the top of Sir Creek, and from the top of Sir Creek eastward to a point on the line designated on the Western Terminus". From this point onward, the boundary is unambiguously fixed as defined by the Tribunal Award of 1968.

==== Junagadh and Manavadar ====
In a new political map released in 2020, Pakistan claimed the former princely states of Junagadh and Manavadar.

=== Nepal ===
Major areas of dispute between India and Nepal are Kalapani, Limpiyadhura, Lipulekh, Susta, Mechi, and Tanakpur. An estimated 60,000 hectares of border land is currently disputed between India and Nepal.

==== Kalapani territory ====
The dispute over Kalapani has its origins in the implementation of the Treaty of Sugauli (1816), which established the Kali River as Nepal's western boundary with India. In 1817, the Nepali governor Bam Shah claimed that the western branch of the headwaters (the Kuthi Yankti, which carries the larger volume of water) should be considered the main stream of the Kali, and that the boundary should therefore follow it — which would place the villages of Kunti and Nabhi inside Nepal. The claim was investigated by surveyor Captain W. S. Webb and Commissioner G. W. Traill, who reported that the eastern stream from the Kalapani springs had always been recognised as the main branch by the local Bhotia inhabitants. The Governor-General Lord Moira rejected the claim in September 1817. The boundary question remained dormant for nearly two centuries until Nepal revived it in the 1990s during debates over the Mahakali Treaty (1996).

The disputed area falls within the historical Byans region, which was part of Kumaon before the Gorkha conquest of 1791 and was divided between British India and Nepal by the Treaty of Sugauli. India has administered the area continuously, with a State Police post established at Kalapani in 1956 and an Indo-Tibetan Border Police post since 1979.

In November 2019, India issued a new political map of the country which, like earlier maps, showed Kalapani as part of India. This new map was rejected by Nepal, and mass protests against India took place across the country and outside the Indian embassy in Nepal. Protesters accused India of occupying their land. In May 2020, the Indian Defence minister, Rajnath Singh inaugurated an 80 km road from Dharchula to Lipulekh pass. Nepal protested against the construction of the road. The Lipulekh area is currently under India's control. On 20 May 2020, Nepal launched its own map showing Kalapani, Limpiyadhura and Lipulekh as parts of its own territory. The new map was subsequently approved by the Nepali parliament on 18 June 2020. India opposed the move, claiming that the decision to include Limpiyadhura, Lipulekh and Kalapani is not based on evidence or historical facts.

On 15 June 2020, the Indian border police, Sashastra Seema Bal (SSB), reported that border pillars, which served as demarcation, were missing along the India-Nepal border. SSB also reported that Nepali border police had established five new border outposts near the disputed area. On 19 June, Nepal started deploying troops near the disputed areas. The troops had established camps and they were working on building a helipad in the area. In the same month Nepali Army Chief, General Purna Chandra Thapa, after visiting the Kalapani border area, stated that the Nepali Army will start building army barracks and border outposts near the Kalapani area. On 21 June, Indian residents in border villages of Dharchula and Jhoolaghat in Pithoragarh district claimed that radio stations in Nepal were conducting a propaganda campaign against India by playing anti-India songs and biased news bulletins showing India in a bad light.

The disputed territory is inhabited by the Byansi people, who historically maintained homes and landholdings on both sides of the India–Nepal border. Land records cited by the Dharchula sub-divisional magistrate in 2020 showed that over 190 acres of land in Kalapani and Nabhidhang were registered in the names of villagers of Garbyang, an Indian village in the Byans region.

In May 2026, Nepalese Prime Minister Balendra Shah announced that his government had formally approached the United Kingdom, seeking its involvement in resolving the long-standing border disputes at Kalapani, Lipulekh, and Limpiyadhura. Shah argued that because these boundaries were drawn during the colonial era, the UK should be concerned about the issue. India, however, has firmly rejected any role for a third party, stating that the issue is a bilateral matter to be resolved through existing mechanisms.

==== Susta territory ====
Susta is another territory that is disputed between Nepal and India. It is currently controlled by India as a part of the Bihar state. The 1816 Treaty of Sugauli defined Gandaki River as the international boundary between India and Nepal. The right bank of the river was under Nepal's control while the left bank was under India's control. Susta village was initially on the right bank when the treaty was signed and it was a part of Nepal. However, over the years, the Gandaki River changed its course and Susta moved to the left bank and is now under India's control. The Government of Nepal has repeatedly stated that Susta belongs to Nepal and that the Indian government should return the area.

== Resolved disputes ==
=== Sri Lanka ===
The dispute on the status of the island of Katchatheevu was settled in 1974 by an agreement between both countries. But still some cases are ongoing in High Court of Madras which are filed earlier regarding this dispute stating as illegally issued to Sri Lanka. Several actions were still taken by the Union Government of India to retrieve that island back to Indian territory once again.

=== Bangladesh ===
South Talpatti (as it was known internationally) or Sheikh Mujib Island (as it was known by Bangladeshi Awami League supporters) was a small uninhabited offshore sandbar landform in the Bay of Bengal, off the coast of the Ganga-Brahmaputra Delta region. In the aftermath of the Bhola cyclone in 1970, it emerged in the Bay of Bengal on the Bangladeshi side of the dividing river, and disappeared before or during Cyclone Aila in 2009. In March 2010, Sugata Hazra of the School of Oceanographic Studies at Jadavpur University, Kolkata, said that the island had disappeared and that sea level rise caused by climate change was a factor.

The enclaves were reputedly part of a high stake card or chess games centuries ago between two regional kings, the Maharaja of Cooch Behar and the Nawab of Rangpur and the result of a confused outcome of a treaty between the Kingdom of Cooch Behar and the Mughal Empire. After the partition of India in 1947, Cooch Behar district joined India and Rangpur went to East Pakistan, which became Bangladesh in 1971. The prime ministers of India and Bangladesh signed a Land Boundary Agreement in 1974 to exchange enclaves and simplify the international border. In 1974, Bangladesh approved a proposed treaty to exchange all enclaves within each other's territories, but India did not ratify it. Another agreement was made in 2011 to exchange enclaves and adverse possessions. A revised version of the agreement was finally adopted by the two countries 41 years after negotiations began, when the Parliament of India passed the 100th Amendment Act to the Indian Constitution on 7 May 2015. Inside the main part of Bangladesh, there were 111 Indian enclaves (17,160.63 acres), while in the main part of India, there were 51 Bangladeshi enclaves (7,110.02 acres). In respect of adverse possessions, India received 2,777.038 acres of land and transferred 2267.682 acres to Bangladesh. India ratified the agreement by constitutional amendment in May 2015. Under this agreement, the enclave residents could continue to reside at their present location or move to the country of their choice. The adverse possession of Berubari went to Bangladesh. The unmarked borders between the nations were also finally solved regarding Daikhata-Dumabari, Muhurichar river island and Pyrdiwah.

In 2009, Bangladesh initiated arbitration proceedings against India under the United Nations Convention on Law of Sea. In 2014 it was awarded a large part of the Bay of Bengal, ending the maritime dispute between the two countries.

== See also ==
- Climate of India
- Borders of India
- Extreme points of India
- Exclusive economic zone of India
- Geography of India
- Outline of India
- Treaty of Sugauli
