= Jad Wio =

French music group

Jad Wio is a French rock band, created in 1982 by Denis Bortek, with Christophe K-Bye joining later. Christophe K-Bye describes Jad Wio's work as "a baroque, excentric, extravagant... universe".

During its history, the band has experimented with a variety of musical genres (batcave, rock, chanson française, electro) and themes: sado-masochism in their Contact album (1989), Blade Runner in Fleur de Métal (1992), horror movies in Monstre moi (1995), without losing its consistency.

Jad Wio's originality resides as much in its lyrics, written mostly in French by Denis Bortek, as in the inventiveness of K-Bye on the guitar and on the combination of wildness and theatricality in its live performances.
