= Mana Pass =

Mountain pass in India and China

Mana Pass (Chongnyi La)
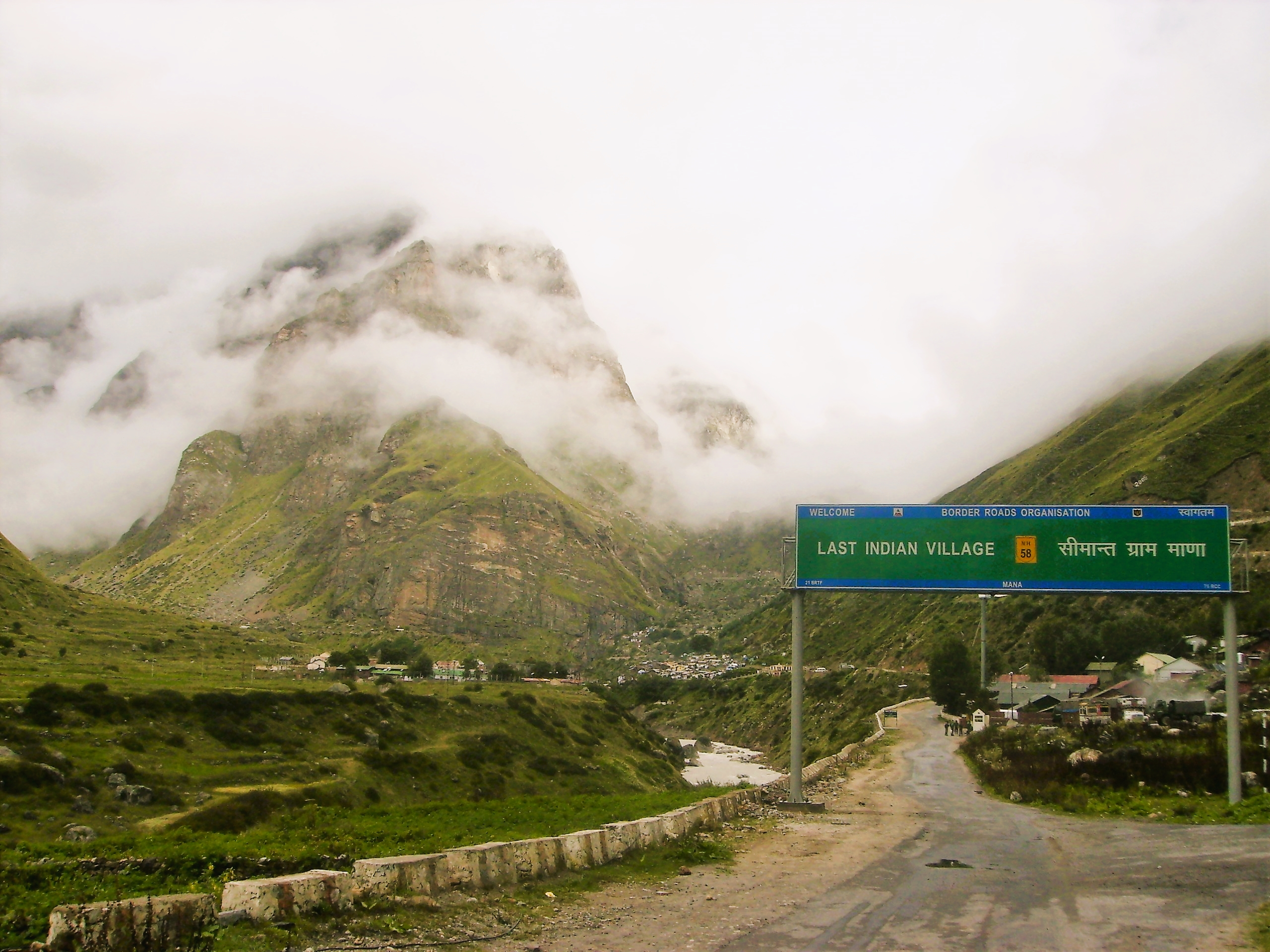
- Mana Village, Badrinath, Uttarakhand, India

- Location within Uttarakhand
- Elevation: 5,632 m (18,478 ft) (SRTM2)
- Traversed by: India National Highway NH58

Third Approach
- Location: Uttarakhand, India – Tibet, China
- Range: Garhwal Himalayas
- Coordinates: 31°04′06″N 79°25′00″E

Mana Pass (Hindi: माणा दर्रा, romanized: Māṇā Darrā) is one of the highest vehicle-accessible passes in the world, containing a road constructed in the 2005-2010 period for the Indian military by the Border Roads Organisation and visible on 2011 imagery on visual globe systems such as Google Earth. The well-graded gravel-dirt road is higher on the Indian side than the new road on the Tibetan side, and rises to 5,610 metres (18,406 ft) on the Indian side of the border, 250 m west of the low point of the 5,632 metres (18,478 ft) Mana Pass SRTM.

== Geography ==
Mana Pass is located within the Nanda Devi Biosphere Reserve, 47 km north of the town of Mana, India and 52 km north of the Hindu pilgrimage town of Badrinath in Uttarakhand. It is the source of the Saraswati River, the longest stem of one of the longest Ganges tributaries, the Alaknanda River. That river trickles through several scenic small ponds between the pass and Lake Deo Tal three km southwest of the pass. Mana pass is also the key col for climbing Chaukhamba peak.

== Background ==
=== Etymology ===
The Mana Pass derives its name from the Manibhadra Ashram, the ancient name of the town of Mana which is located near the 6,561 metres (21,526 ft) high Manaswini Peak of the Himalayan range. Manibhadra Ashram is the birthplace of Devi Manaswini, sister of Manasa Devi and daughter of Lord Shiva.

=== History ===
Mana Pass was an ancient trade route between Uttarakhand and Tibet, and also connected Kailash Mansarovar region with the Chardham region. The Mana Pass led from Badrinath to the kingdom, now the prefecture of Ngari in Tibet. The Portuguese Jesuits António de Andrade and Manuel Marques became the first known Europeans to enter Tibet across Mana Pass in 1624. The pass continued as a minor trade route until its closure in 1951 by the Chinese.

On April 29, 1954, China and India signed an agreement granting pilgrims and indigenous travelers the right to travel between the two countries through Mana Pass. The pass is important to both Hindus and Budhhists, as in 900 AD, Tibetan Buddhist Guru Gang Rinpoche Lama (also known as Guru Kang Rinpoche Lama and Padmasambhava) used this pass to travel between India and Tibet. Mount Kailash is also named after Guru Gang Rinpoche Lama (also known as Guru Kang Rinpoche Lama).

== Transport ==
The pass is reached from the south by an extension of India National Highway 7 (NH-7, old number NH-58) that connects Fazilka with Badrinath, though beyond Badrinath the graded road is subject to landslides. Groups of enthusiast motorcycle riders can often be seen on this road. Free Souls Rider Motorcycle Club were the first non-military citizens to scale the heights of Mana Pass and hold the record in the Limca Book of Records.

The motorable roads to Nelang/Sumla/Pulam Sumda and Mana Pass at the LAC have been constructed by India's Border Roads Organisation (BRO) under the India-China Border Roads (ICBR).

== See also ==
- Nelang
- China-India relations

== Bibliography ==
- Holdich, Sir Thomas H; Tibet the Mysterious, (1906) University Press, Cambridge, Massachusetts
- MacGregor, John. Tibet: A Chronicle of Exploration, (1970) Routledge & Kegan Paul, London, SBN 7100-6615-5
