= Uttarkashi district =

- District
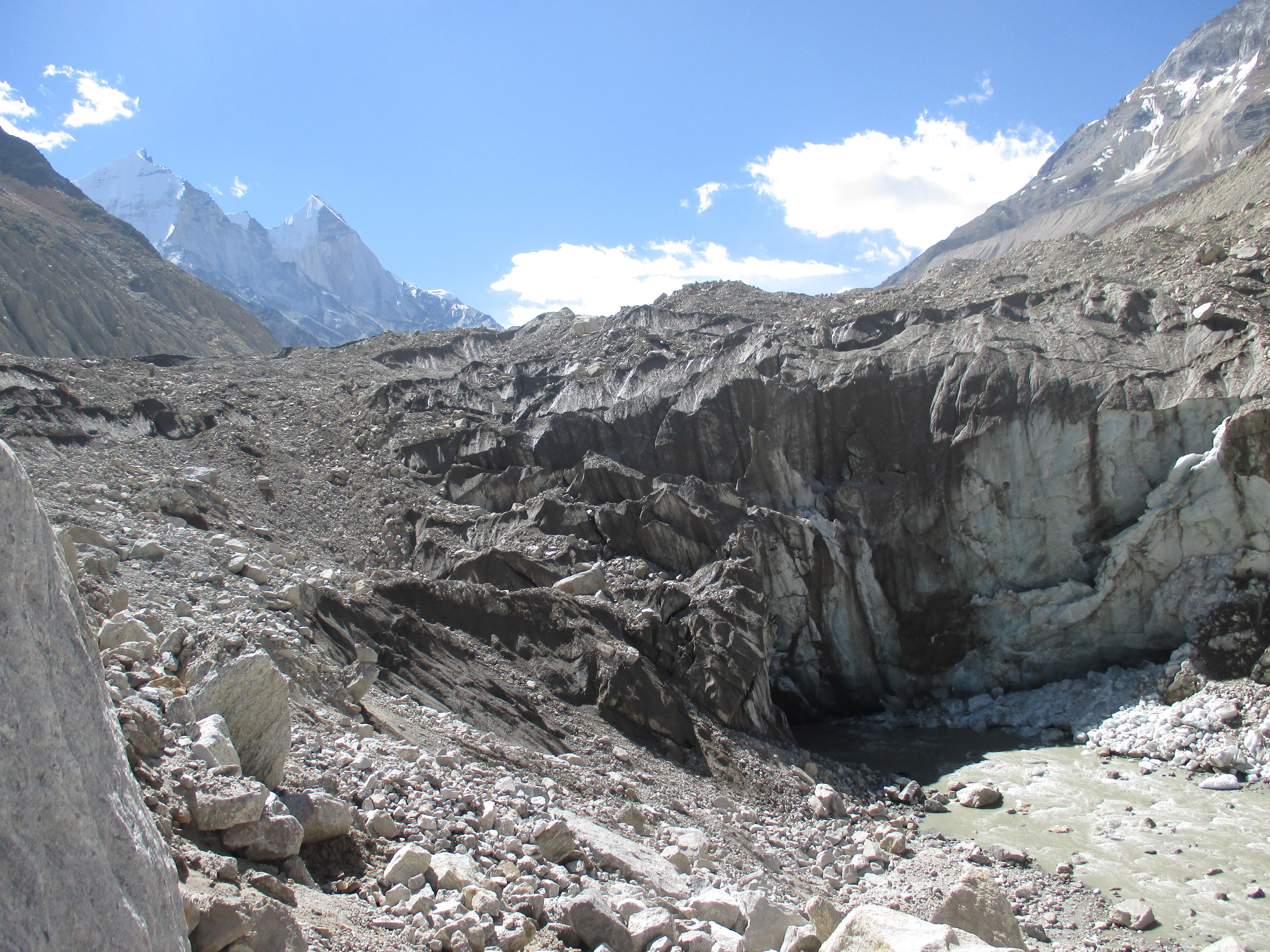
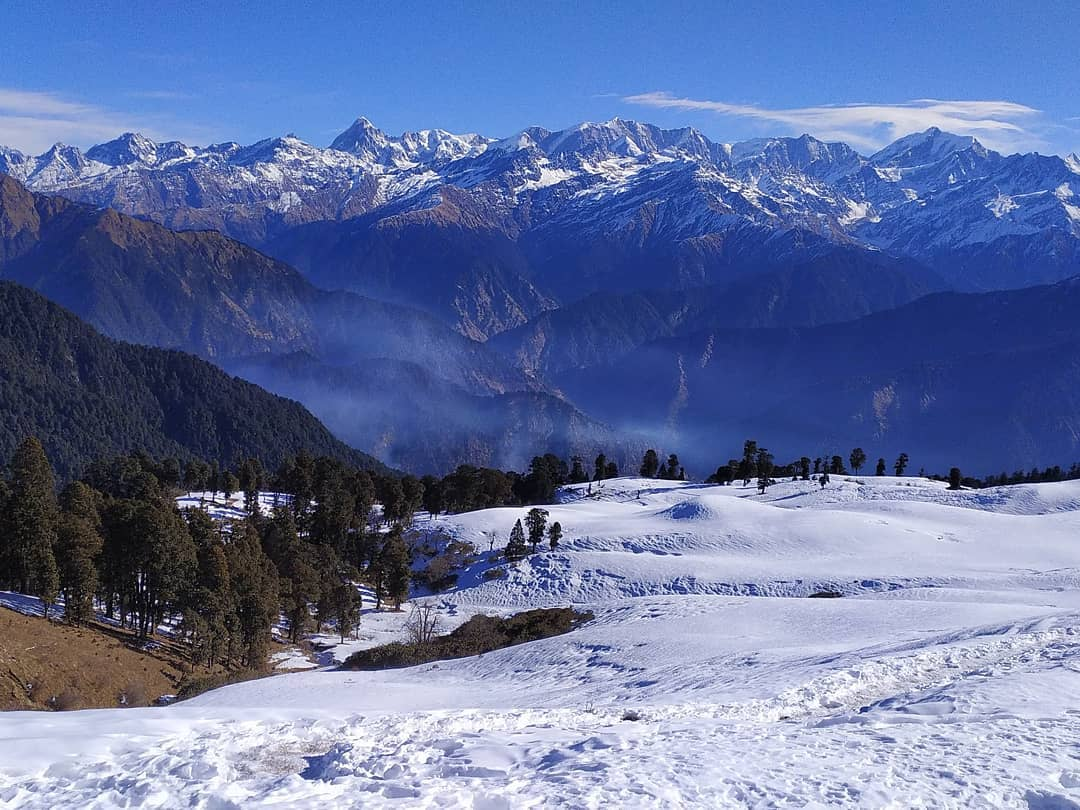
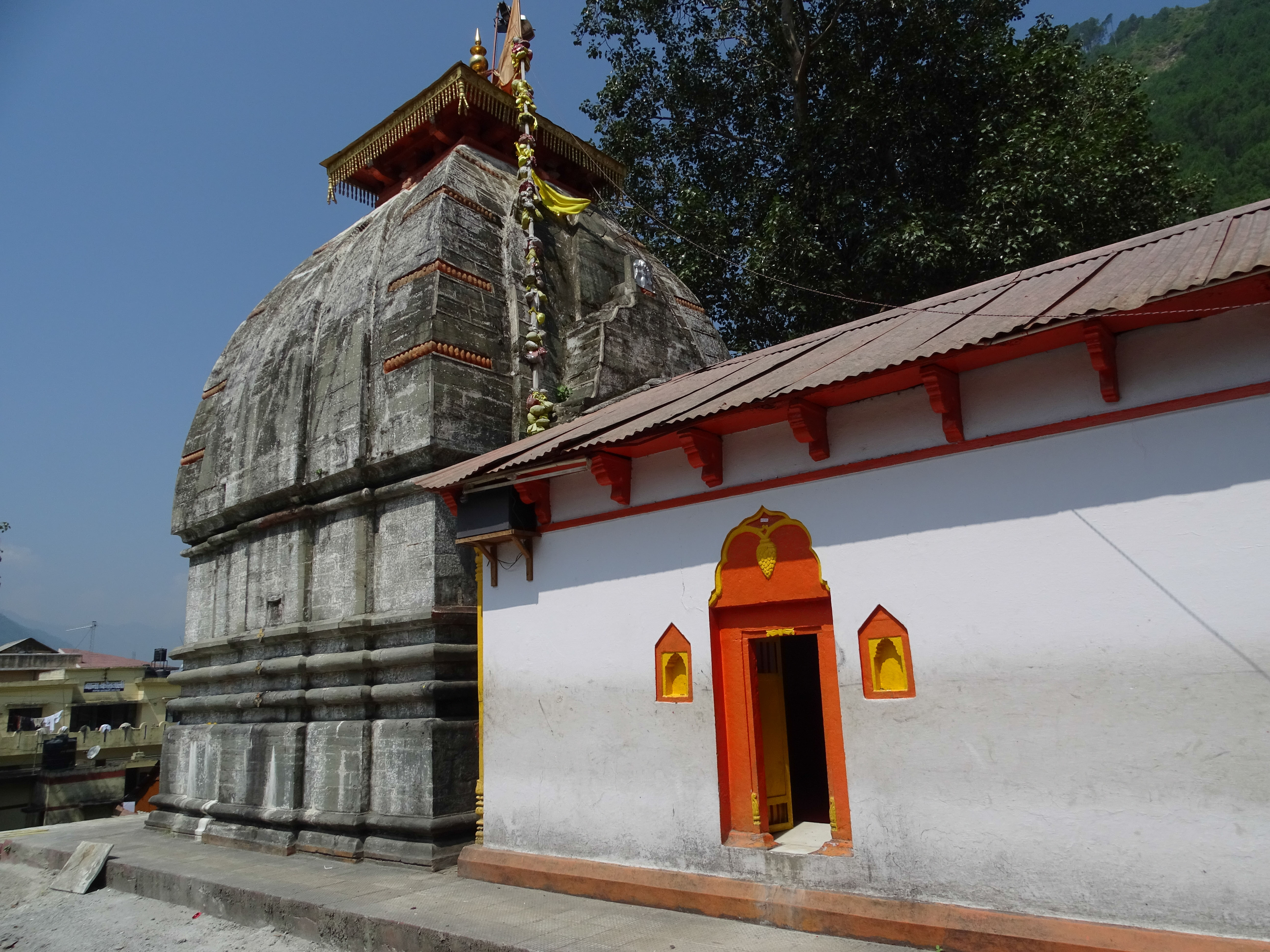
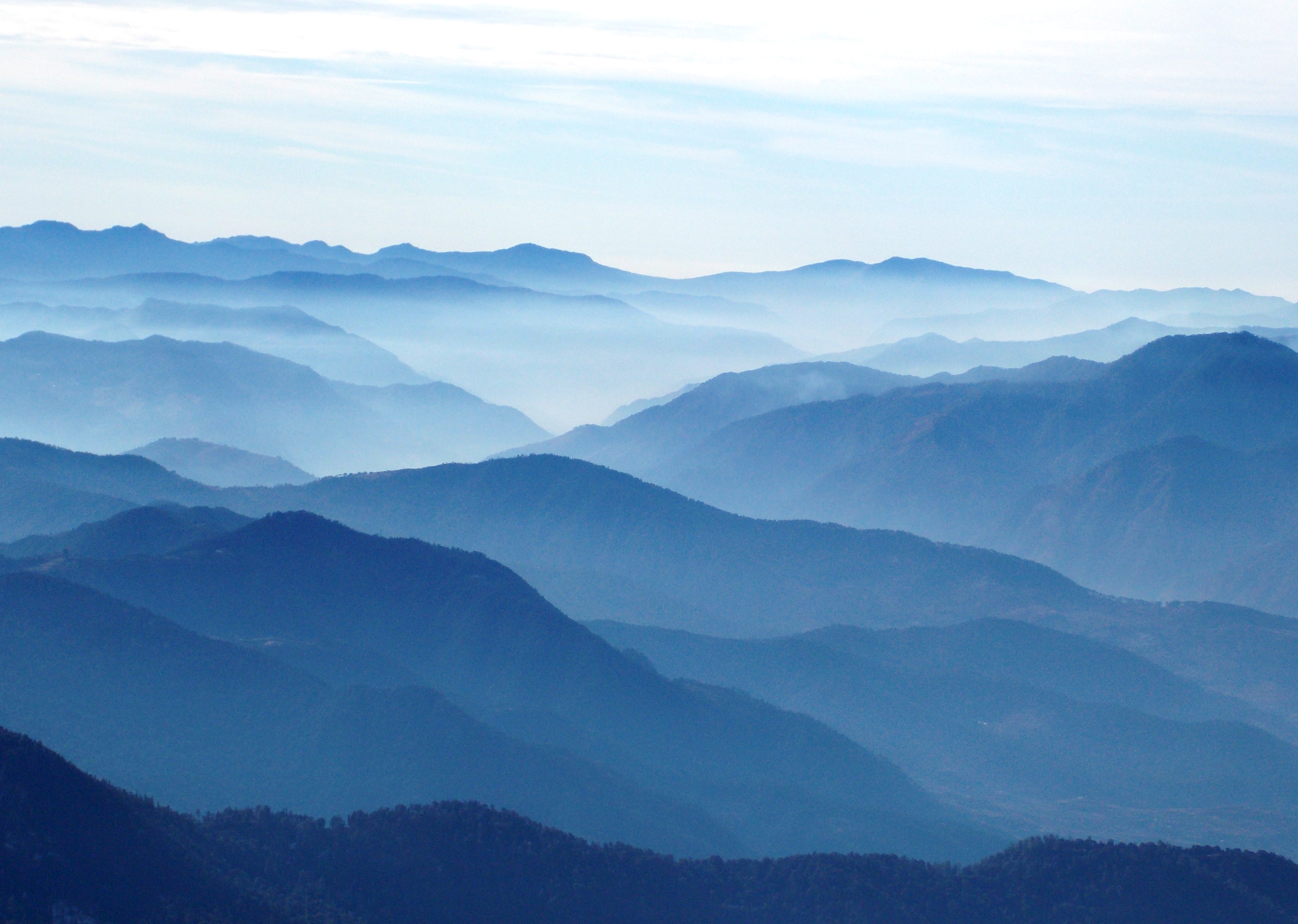
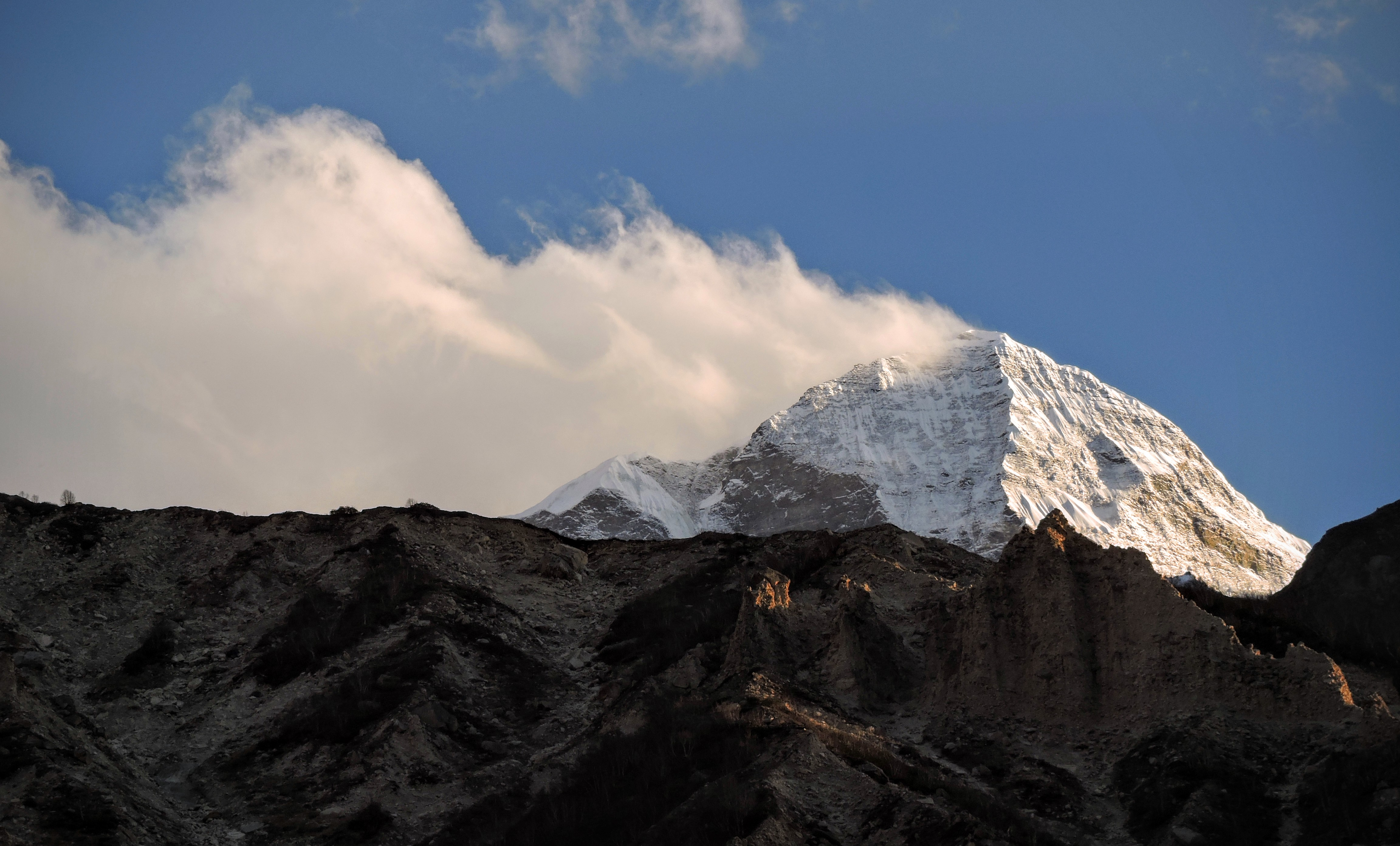
- Clockwise from top-left: Gaumukh, view from Dayara Bugyal, Hills near Kedarkantha, Peaks in Gangotri National Park, Kashi Vishwanath Temple in Uttarkashi
- Nickname: Kashi of the North
- Location in Uttarakhand
- Uttarkashi district
- Coordinates: 30.73°N 78.45°E
- Country: India
- State: Uttarakhand
- Division: Garhwal
- Established: 1960
- Headquarters: Uttarkashi

Government
  - District collector: Prashant Arya IAS

Area
  - Total: 8,016 km^{2} (3,095 sq mi)

Population
  - Total: 330,086
  - Density: 41/km^{2} (110/sq mi)

Languages
  - Official: Hindi
  - Native: Garhwali; Mahasu Pahari; Bhotia
- Time zone: UTC+5:30 (IST)
- Vehicle registration: UK-10
- Website: uttarkashi.nic.in

Uttarkashi district is a district of Garhwal division of the Uttarakhand state in northern India, and has its headquarters at Uttarkashi city. It has 6 tehsil . Barkot, Dunda, Bhatwadi, Chinyalisaur, Purola and Mori. The district contains the source of the Bhagirathi River (traditionally considered the headstream of the Ganga) at Gangotri and the Yamuna River at Yamunotri, both of which are highly significant and popular pilgrimage sites.

Uttarkashi town, which lies on the main road to Gangotri, is also considered an important Hindu pilgrimage centre, especially for Saivites. The district is bounded on the north by Kinnaur and Shimla districts of Himachal Pradesh, on the northeast by Tibet, on the east by Chamoli District, on the southeast by Rudraprayag district, on the south by Tehri Garhwal district, and on the west by Dehradun district.

== Background ==
=== Etymology ===
The term Uttarkashi, a composite of Uttara and Kashi, literally means the North Kashi where Kashi refers to Varanasi. Both Uttarkashi and Varanasi are highly significant Hindu pilgrimage sites on the sacred Ganges. Both Kashi and Uttarkashi have important Shiva temples called Kashi Vishwanath temple.

=== History ===
==== Vedic era ====
The area now made up by Uttarkashi district has been known since the times of the Rig Vedic period. The Aitareya Brahmana mentions it as the land where the Devas performed ritual sacrifices, and the Kaushitaki Brahmana mentions this area was where Vedic Sanskrit had changed the least. In the Upayana Parva of the Mahabharata, various hill tribes from the hill and mountain region of what is now Garhwal are mentioned as giving gifts to Yudhishthira during his Rajasuya yagna, including the Taganas, Kiratas and Kunindas. Ptolemy mentions the Taganas as the Taganoi and says they lived on the eastern side of the Ganges, while he says the Kulindrine (Kunindas) lived above the sources of the Beas, Sutlej, Yamuna and Ganga, and the Kiratas on the northern slops of the Himalayas. According to legend, Parshurama killed his mother Renuka at Nakuri, 10 km from Uttarkashi town. Also, it is said the Pandavas, after leaving their kingdom to Parikshit, halted at Patangini before continuing to Swargarohini, where they died.

==== Medieval era ====
Historically, the region might have been a part of the Mauryan empire, but this is unknown. It is presumed to have been a part of the Kushan empire, which extended through the western and central Himalayas as far as Tibet. In the 1st century CE, Rajapala of Badrinath established a kingdom that may have extended to Uttarkashi. A 5th century CE inscription in the Uttarkashi Vishwanath temple mentions a prince called Ganeshwara whose son had commissioned the inscription to honour himself and his father. The city of Uttarkashi is mentioned as Brahmapura by Xuanzang, who notes it was ruled by queens. In the 7th century, a branch of the Katyuris pushed out the descendants of Rajapala of Badrinath to the position of feudatories and established an empire covering what is now Kumaon and Garhwal. The last descendant of Rajapala was Bhanupratapa, the pre-eminent chief among the 52 rulers called garhpals (fort holders, from where Garhwal derives its name). Bhanupratapa had two daughters, one of whom he married to a Paramara prince from Malwa, Kanak Pal, who was on pilgrimage. Kanak Pal was made his heir, and ascended the throne in 888 CE. Kanakpal and his descendants began establishing their hegemony over the other petty chiefs, some of whom had headquarters in Uttarkashi, as the power of their Katyuri overlords declined.

Up to the first half of the 11th century, nothing is known about the first 10 rulers of the Garhwal kingdom. They were probably feudatories of the Katyuris who ruled over parts of Uttarkashi. By the time of the end of the 11th century, when the Katyuri hegemony collapsed, the family of Kanakpal were regarded as the most pre-eminent of the 52 traditional garhpals. Near the end of the 12th century, Ashoka Challa of the Khasa kingdom (now in western Nepal) conquered Garhwal as far as Uttarkashi, evidenced by an inscription in the Barahat (Uttarkashi) Vishwanath temple. However the Garhwal rajas soon regained their position, and again the last king of the line had only a daughter. Another Paramara prince from Malwa there on pilgrimage, Kadilpal, was made his heir and married his daughter, although it is unknown whether this story is merely apocryphal.

His descendant, Ajapal, lived during 1358-70 and was attacked by the raja of Champawat, but defeated him. Ajapal also seemingly created an alliance of the many chieftains of Garhwal and overthrew the raja of Chandpur. His descendant Rajapal led an unsuccessful expedition against Tibet that probably passed through modern Uttarkashi district. The Garhwal rajas, although friendly with the Delhi sultanate in the plains, were never subordinate to them. Rajapal's descendant Man Shah led raids north into Tibet and south into the plains in the mid 16th century. His descendants defended against the rising power of the Kumaon kingdom, which was encroaching on Garhwal's eastern boundaries, but Uttarkashi was not affected. Mahipati Shah was the first Garhwal Raja to fully control the entirety of Kumaon, including all of Uttarkashi, from his capital at Srinagar in around 1580.

The Garhwal Rajas, although not directly controlled by the Mughals, still had to pay tribute. The historian Firishta records Garhwal (modern scholars believe he confused it with Kumaon) was a wealthy and powerful mountain kingdom that produced significant amounts of copper and gold, both metals mined from ancient times in Uttarkashi district. In 1635, a famine struck Garhwal and the year after, a Mughal force invaded the region. However the raja soon starved out the Mughals and forced them to retreat, while another Mughal expedition in 1654 aided by the raja of Kumaon failed also. After Dara Shukoh's defeat in 1658, his son Sulaiman took refuge for a year with the Garhwal raja Prithvi Shah. However threat of invasion from Aurangzeb and the Kumaon rajas, as well as pressure from many in his court forced Shah to give up Sulaiman to Aurangzeb. Uttarkashi remained relatively uninfluenced by the subsequent border wars between Kumaon and Garhwal.

Garhwal and Kumaon fought against the Rohillas in 1745, but were defeated and Garhwal was forced to pay 3 lakhs as tribute. After this, Garhwal was devastated by a Rohilla invasion in 1757.

==== Modern era ====
===== Gorkha invasion =====
In 1795, Gorkha troops temporarily overran Garhwal, including the entirety of Uttarkashi district, having earlier occupied Kumaon five years earlier. However news of a Chinese invasion of Nepal caused the Nepalis to retreat from Garhwal. The Garhwal ruler Pradyuman Shah agreed to pay a tribute to the Gorkha rulers and send an agent to Kathmandu, an arrangement that lasted for 12 years. In the beginning of 1803, Uttarkashi in particular was devastated by an earthquake. The next year Gorkha generals including Amar Singh Thapa led a second invasion against Garhwal. The Garhwal raja, Pradyuma Shah, retreated via Uttarkashi to Dehradun, where he was defeated in the Battle of Khurbura and killed. His sons fled to British territory, and Amar Singh Thapa was made governor of Garhwal in 1805. Gorkha rule is remembered as a dark time with widespread looting, rape and violence.

===== British invasion =====
In 1814, the Anglo-Nepalese War broke out and the British invaded Garhwal through Dehradun but were repulsed multiple times. However, after the war's end and the subsequent Treaty of Sugauli, the Gorkhas relinquished all territory west of the Kali river, including Garhwal and Uttarkashi district. Garhwal west of the Alaknanda, excluding Dehradun and all of Uttarkashi, was returned to the Garhwal rajas, who subsequently imposed violent retaliation on the remaining Gorkhas. Uttarkashi at this time was regarded as rocky and barren. In subsequent negotiations, Rawain tehsil, modern Uttarkashi, was returned to the Garhwal raja.

===== Rawain Kand movement =====
In 1930, the Tiladi massacre, also known as Rawain massacre or Kand (रवाईं हत्याकांड) movement, began in the district against unjust forest settlement laws. The raja invited their leaders for talks, but arrested them. The protestors turned violent and attacked the forest officers, and the raja called in troops who arrested 100 people for sedition. In 1947, Garhwal acceded to the Indian Union as Garhwal district of the United Provinces (soon to be renamed Uttar Pradesh). In 1960, Uttarkashi was carved out as a separate district. Uttarkashi was later included in the newly formed state of Uttarakhand in 2000.

== Geography ==
=== Glaciers of Uttarkashi District ===
Glacier	Height (m)
Gangotri Glacier	4,040
Chaturangi	4,400
I Unnamed TG of Chaturangi	5,120
Kalindi	5,440
Seeta	5,400
Suralaya	5,120
II Unnamed TG of Chaturangi	5,190
III Unnamed TG of Chaturangi	4,980
Vasuki	4,800
Bhagirathi Parvat I	6,512
Bhagirathi Parvat II	6,556
Bhagirathi Parvat III	6,195
Bhagirathi Parvat IV	6,625
Swachand	4,880
Miandi	4,980
Sumeru	4,900
Ghanohim	4,740
Kirti and its Tributary Glaciers (TG)	
(A) Kirti	4,520
(B) I Unnamed TG of Kirti	4,570
(C) II Unnamed TG of Kirti	4,860
(D) III Unnamed TG of Kirti	4,860
Glaciers present in the study area and directly draining into Bhagirathi river	
Maitri	4,000
Meru	4,720
Bhrigupanth	3,720
Manda	3,880
Raktavarna and its Tributary Glaciers (TG)	
(A) Raktavarna	4,500
(B) Thelu	5,040
(C) Swetamber	4,760
(D) I Unnamed TG of Raktavarna	5,100
(E) II Unnamed TG of Raktavarna	5,240
(F) Nilamber	5,300
(G) III Unnamed TG of Raktavarna	5,200
(H) Pilapani	5,080

=== Natural disasters ===
- 1976: Fire in the Main Market in the morning of 1976.
- 1978: Floods in Bhagirathi River due to a dam made by the debris bought by Kandolia Gard, a small riverlet. The dam was breached by the Army using explosives. Thousand gallons of water rushed along the river and caused damage to agricultural land, ashrams and houses located along the banks of the river. There was no major loss of life as the district administration took adequate precautions by evacuating the low-lying areas along the banks of the river.
- 1984: Cloud burst in Gyansu nala.
- 1991: Earthquake: On 20 October 1991, Uttarkashi and nearby areas were hit by an earthquake measuring 6.8 on the Ritcher scale.
- 2003: On 23 September 2003 Uttarkashi was hit by a landslide in which hotels, shops in the bus stand area were destroyed. Housing colony of Horticulture department in the Masjid Mohalla area was completely destroyed under the falling debris from top of the Varunavat mountain.
- 2013 Uttarakhand floods: Uttarkashi was hit by a flash flood caused by cloud burst in the Asi Ganga River catchment area and Bhagirathi River catchment area. The flash floods caused wide scale damage to property and agricultural land along the banks of both the rivers. Many hotels ware washed away in flooding waters of Bhagirathi River (Akash Ganga Hotel, Portion of Gautam Park Hotel, Pwd Office at Joshiyara). Many bridges were destroyed during the floods (Didsari Suspension Bridge, Naluna Suspension Bridge, Joshiyara Suspension Bridge, Athali Suspension Bridge).

• 2025 Uttarakhand flash flood, a cloud burst occurred near the village of Dharali in Uttarakhand.

== Ecology ==
See Indomalayan realm

== Political divisions ==
=== Lok Sabha constituency ===
Uttarkashi district falls in the Tehri Garhwal (Lok Sabha constituency).

=== Assembly constituencies ===
1. Purola (SC)
2. Yamunotri
3. Gangotri

=== Tehsils ===
The district has six tehsils:

Barkot

Dunda

Bhatwadi

Chinyalisaur

Purola

Mori.

== Demographics ==
=== Culture ===
Upper reaches on Line of Actual Control (LAC), especially Nelang, Jadhang (Sang) and Pulam Sumda area, are inhabited by the Char Bhutia tribe.

=== Demographics ===
Religions in Uttarkashi district (2011)
Religion	Percent
Hinduism	98.42%
Islam	1.08%
Other or not stated	0.50%
Distribution of religions

According to the 2011 census Uttarkashi district has a population of 330,086, roughly equal to the nation of Belize. This gives it a ranking of 567th in India (out of a total of 640). The district has a population density of 41 inhabitants per square kilometre (110/sq mi). Its population growth rate over the decade 2001–2011 was 11.75%. Uttarkashi has a sex ratio of 959 females for every 1000 males, and a literacy rate of 75.98%. Scheduled Castes and Scheduled Tribes make up 24.41% and 1.06% of the population respectively.

Languages of Uttarkashi district (2011)
1. Garhwali (80.8%)
2. Hindi (7.28%)
3. Bhotia (3.06%)
4. Upper Mahasu Pahari (2.18%)
5. Nepali (2.17%)
6. Others (4.54%)

According to the 2011 census, 80.77% of the population spoke Garhwali, 7.28% Hindi, and 2.17% Nepali as their first language. Various indigenous Tibetic languages (returned under a variety of different names) such as Jad were spoken by 3.06% of the district's population. Hindi is the lingua franca.

Historical population
Year	Pop.	±% p.a.
1901	69,209	—
1911	77,429	+1.13%
1921	81,958	+0.57%
1931	89,978	+0.94%
1941	102,280	+1.29%
1951	106,058	+0.36%
1961	122,836	+1.48%
1971	147,805	+1.87%
1981	190,948	+2.59%
1991	239,709	+2.30%
2001	295,013	+2.10%
2011	330,086	+1.13%

== Geographical indication ==
Uttarakhand Lal Chawal (Red Rice) was awarded the Geographical Indication (GI) status tag from the Geographical Indications Registry, under the Union Government of India, on 8 November 2023.

Bhagirathi Annapurna Sabji Utpadak Swayat Sahakarita from Uttarkashi, proposed the GI registration of Uttarakhand Lal Chawal (Red Rice). After filing the application in March 2022, the rice was granted the GI tag in 2023 by the Geographical Indication Registry in Chennai, making the name "Uttarakhand Lal Chawal (Red Rice)" exclusive to the rice grown in the region. It thus became the first rice variety from Uttarakhand and the 14th type of goods from Uttarakhand to earn the GI tag.

The GI tag protects the rice from illegal selling and marketing, and gives it legal protection and a unique identity.

== See also ==
- List of districts of Uttarakhand
