= Uttarkashi =

Uttarkashi Kashi of North, Shivnagri, Saumyakashi or Barahat
- City
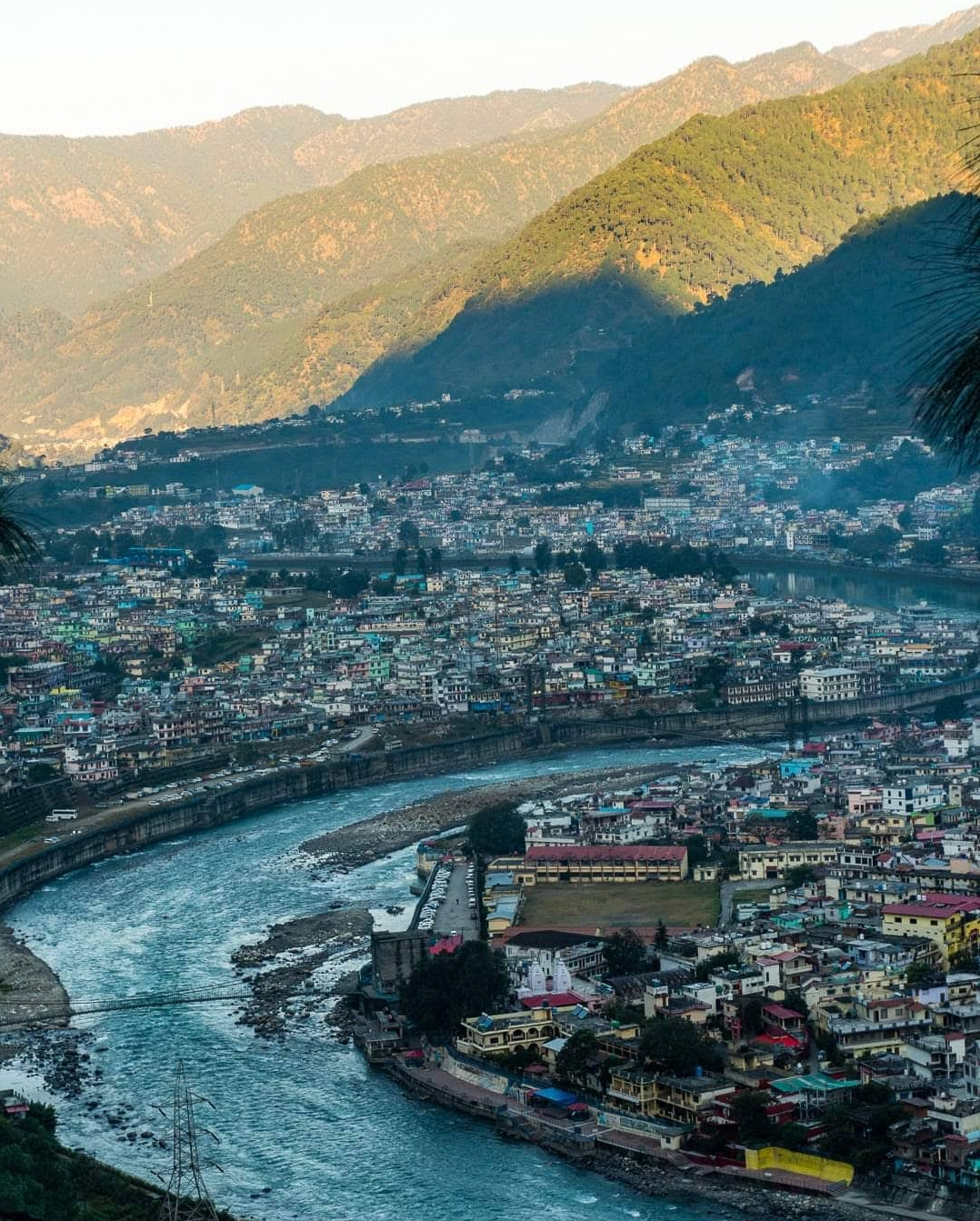
- Uttarkashi City

- Location in Uttarakhand, India Uttarkashi (India)
- Coordinates: 30.73°N 78.45°E
- Country: India
- State: Uttarakhand
- District: Uttarkashi

Government
  - Type: Municipality
  - Body: Nagar Palika Barahat
- Elevation: 1,158 m (3,799 ft)

Population (2011)
  - Total: 17,475

Languages
  - Official: Hindi
  - Native: Garhwali
- Time zone: UTC+5:30 (IST)
- PIN: 249193
- Telephone code: 01374
- Vehicle registration: UK10
- Website: uttarkashi.nic.in

Uttarkashi is a city and the headquarters of Uttarkashi district in Uttarakhand, India.

== Geography ==
Uttarkashi is located at 30.73°N 78.45°E. It has an average elevation of 1,165 metres (3,822 ft).

== Uttarkashi Tunnel Rescue ==
On 12 November 2023, 41 construction workers at Uttarkashi Tunnel in Uttarakhand were trapped in the tunnel by a collapse. On 28 November all workers were rescued.

== See also ==
- 1991 Uttarkashi earthquake
- 2023 Uttarakhand tunnel collapse
- 2025 Uttarakhand flash flood
