= Uttarakhand Chardham Devasthanam Management Act, 2019 =

Shrine Board Act

Uttarakhand Chardham Devasthanam Management Act 2019

Uttarakhand Legislative Assembly
- Long title: An Act to establish a Char Dham Devasthanam Board, which is responsible for the overall management of the Char Dham temples.
- Citation: Act No. 06 of 2020
- Territorial extent: Uttarakhand
- Enacted by: Uttarakhand Legislative Assembly
- Enacted: 10 December 2019
- Assented to: 30 December 2019
- Effective: 30 December 2019
- Repealed: 30 November 2021

Legislative history
- Bill title: Uttarakhand Chardham Devasthanam Management Bill 2019
- Introduced by: Trivendra Singh Rawat
- Introduced: 10 December 2019
- Voting summary: 49 voted for; 20 voted against

Repealed by
- Repealing Act of 2023

Struck down by
- Government of Uttarakhand
- Status: Repealed

The Uttarakhand Chardham Devasthanam Management Act, 2019 was enacted by the Government of Uttarakhand in December 2019. It aims at bringing the Chota Char Dham of Badrinath Temple, Kedarnath Temple, Gangotri Temple, Yamunotri Temple and 49 other temples under the purview of a proposed shrine board.

== Description ==
As per the act, the shrine board is the highest governing body for the management of the temples with power to frame policies, make decisions to give effect to the provisions of this act, of budget formulation and to sanction expenditure among others. The board may also give instructions for the safe custody, prevention and management of funds, valuable securities, jewellery and properties vested in the temples. The board was also supposed to provide integrated, advanced and smooth services to the devotees. Earlier before the Chota Char Dham was governed by Shri Badrinath-Kedarnath Mandir Samiti which was chaired by a state government appointed person.

== Criticism ==
The Act was widely criticized by the local Hindu priests and Vishva Hindu Parishad Leaders who were against the formation of any board and want that the Hindu temples must be governed by the Hindu society, not the government. Hindu saints and VHP leaders also protested several times against the act. In July 2020, a Public Interest Litigation was filed by Rajya Sabha MP Subramanian Swamy challenging the constitution validity of the Uttarakhand Chardham Devasthanam Management Act, 2019 and asking to sought a direction striking down the act which was dismissed by the Uttarakhand High Court.

== Repeal of Uttarakhand Devasthanam Management Act, 2019 ==
In July 2021 Pushkar Singh Dhami led BJP government announced the formation of High power committee to review the Uttarakhand Chardham Devasthanam Management Act, 2019 accepting the requests of priests and VHP leaders. On November 30, 2021 the Uttarakhand government announced the repeal of the act following the report of the High power committee. Politically the withdrawal of act was also seen as a "political stunt" by the BJP government ahead of the 2022 Uttarakhand Legislative Assembly election.
