= Yamunotri =

- Glacier
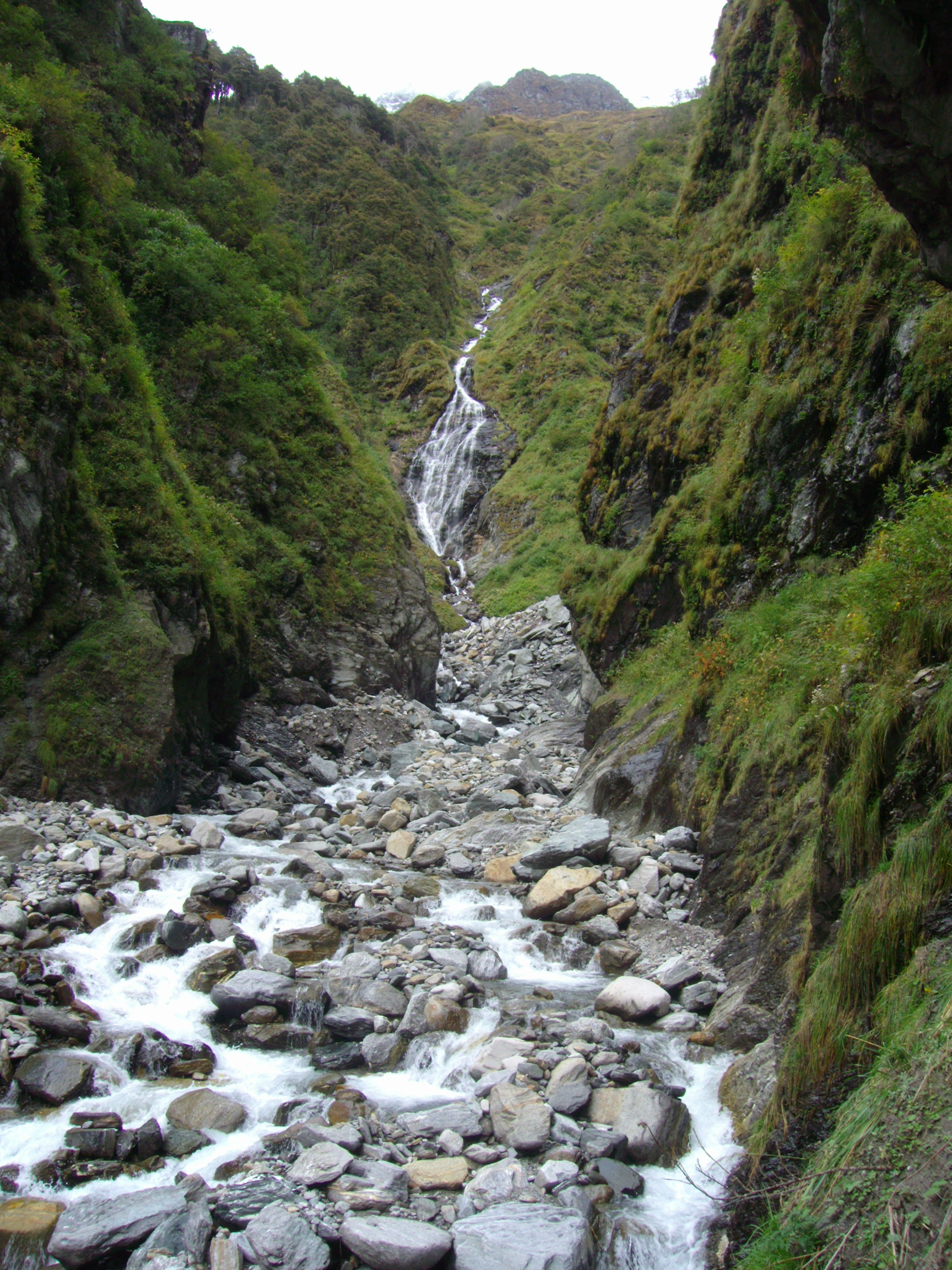
- Yamuna River at Yamunotri
- Interactive map of Yamunotri
- Location within Uttarakhand Location within India
- Coordinates: 31.01°N 78.45°E
- Country: India
- State: Uttarakhand
- District: Uttarkashi
- Vehicle registration: UK
- Website: badrinath-kedarnath.gov.in

Yamunotri, also Jamnotri, is the source of the Yamuna River and the seat of the Goddess Yamuna in Hinduism. It is situated at an altitude of 3,293 metres (10,804 ft) in the Garhwal Himalayas and located approximately 150 kilometres (93 mi) North of Uttarkashi, the headquarters of the Uttarkashi district in the Garhwal Division of Uttarakhand, India. It is one of the four sites in India's Chota Char Dham pilgrimage. The sacred shrine of Yamunotri, source of the river Yamuna, is the westernmost shrine in the Garhwal Himalayas, perched atop a flank of the Bandarpunch mountain. The chief attraction at Yamunotri is the temple devoted to the Goddess Yamuna and the holy thermal springs at Janki Chatti which is 7 km away.

The actual source, a frozen lake of ice and glacier (Champasar Glacier) located on the Kalind Mountain at a height of 4,421 m above sea level, about 1 km further up, is not frequented generally as it is not accessible; hence the shrine has been located on the foot of the hill. The approach is extremely difficult and pilgrims therefore offer puja at the temple itself.

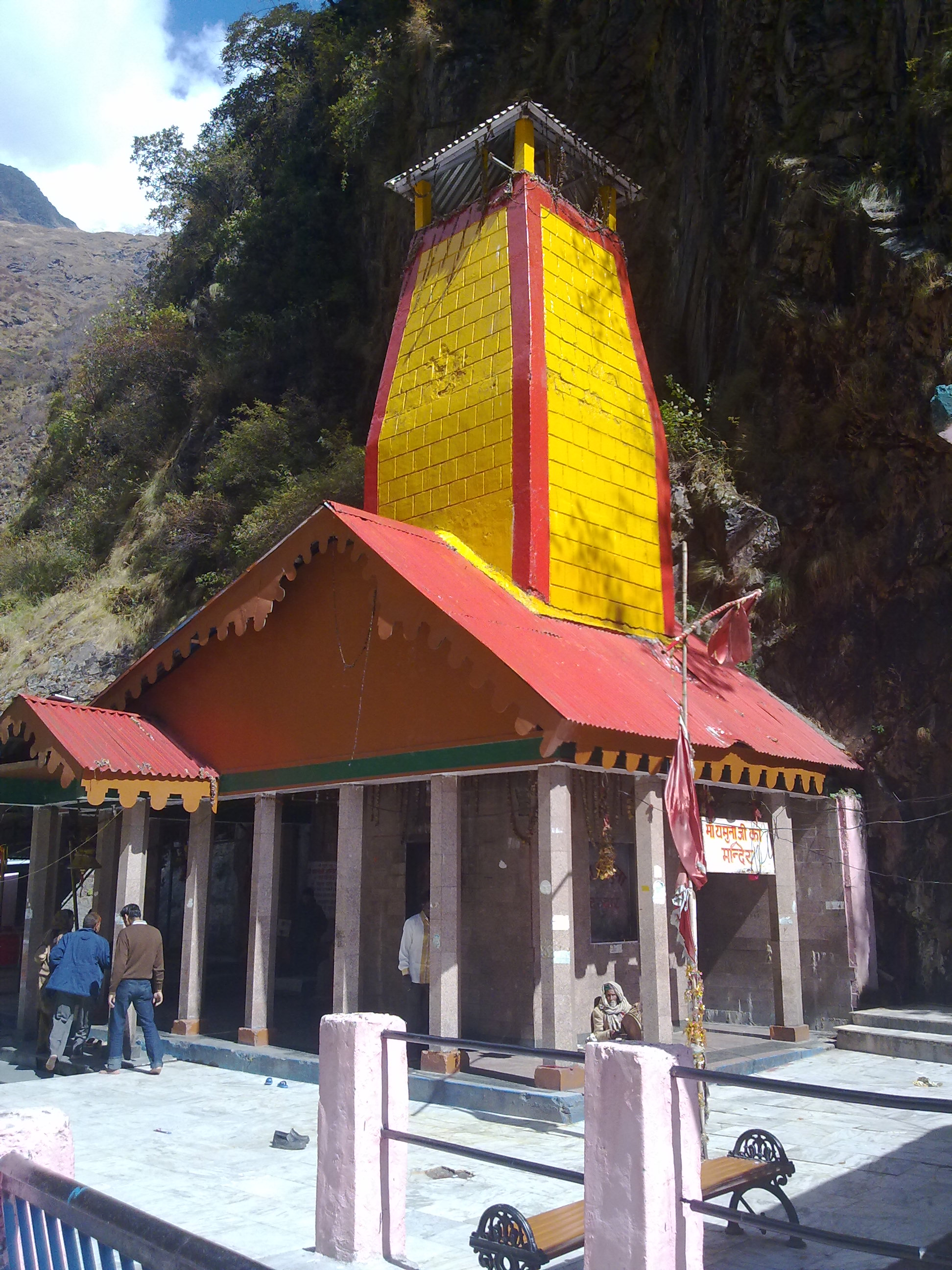
Yamunotri temple was built by Maharani Guleria of Jaipur in the 19th century.

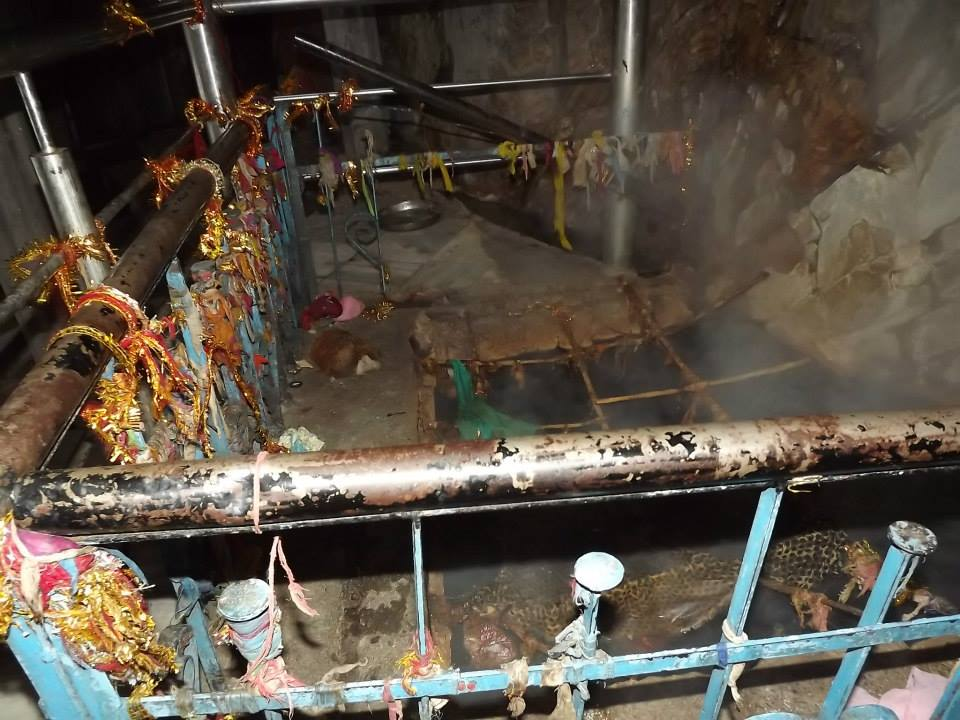
Janki Chatti hot water spring, Surya Kund.

== Geography ==
Yamunotri is located at 31.01°N 78.45°E. It has an average elevation of 3,954 metres (12,972 ft).

== Yamuna River ==
The actual source of Yamuna River lies in the Yamunotri Glacier, at a height of 6,387 metres (20,955 ft), near the Bandarpunch peaks in the Lower Himalayas and is dedicated to goddess Yamuna. It crosses the states of Uttarakhand, Haryana, Uttar Pradesh, Himachal Pradesh and later Delhi before merging with the Ganges at Triveni Sangam, Prayagraj.

== Yamunotri Temple ==
Yamunotri Temple is situated in the western region of Garhwal Himalayas at an altitude of 3,235 metres (10,614 ft) near the river source. The temple was built in 1839 by Sundarshan Shah who was the king of the cultural center of Tehri. There was a small shrine at the site prior to the construction of the temple. The Divya Shila and Surya Kund are located near the temple. The Yamunotri Temple, on the left bank of the Yamuna, was constructed by Maharaja Pratap Shah of Tehri Garhwal. The deity is made of black marble. The Yamuna, like the Ganges, has been elevated to the status of a divine mother for the Hindus and has been held responsible for nurturing and developing the Indian civilisation.

There are hot water springs located close to the temple. Surya Kund is the most important. Near the Surya Kund there is a rock called Divya Shila, which is worshipped prior to offering worship to Yamuna. Devotees prepare rice and potatoes, tied in muslin cloth, to offer at the shrine by dipping them in these hot water springs. The cooked rice is taken back home as prasada.

== See also ==
- Gangotri
- Chhota Char Dham
- Uttarkashi district
