= Akshaya Tritiya =

Annual Hindu and Jain festival

Akśaya Tṛtīyā
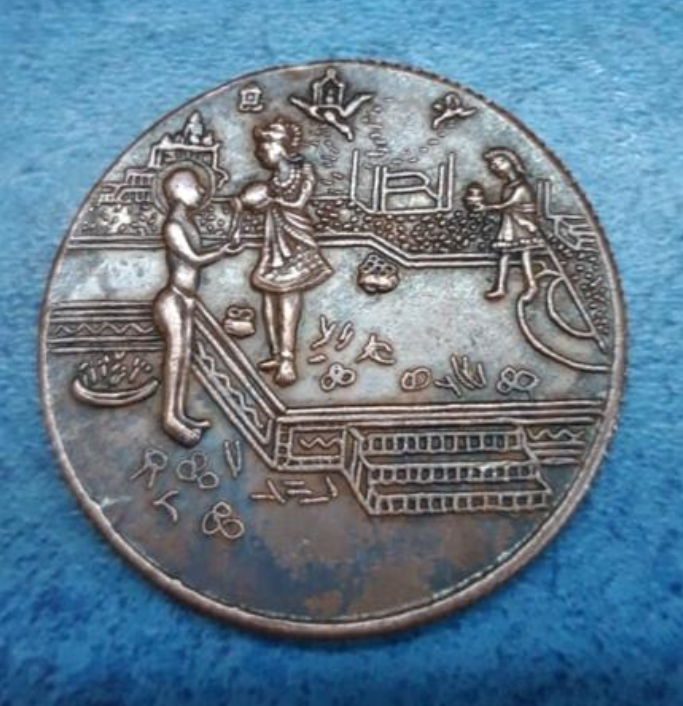
- A vintage religious token depicting Lord Ṛṣabhanātha (Ikśvāku) accepting sugarcane juice from King Śreyaṇsa and ending his 400 days-long fast without food.
- Official name: अक्षय तृतीया
- Observed by: Jain, Hindu
- Significance: A day believed to bring endless prosperity, success, and good fortune.
- Observances: prayers, distribution of sugarcane juice and festive foods, and charity
- Date: Vaisakha Shukla Tritiya
- Frequency: Annual

Akśaya Tṛtīyā, also known as Ākhā Tīja, is an annual Jaina and Hindu spring festival. It falls on the third tithi (lunar day) of the bright half (Śukla Pakśa) of the Hindu month of Vaiśākha.

Many Jains and Hindus consider the day auspicious for purchasing rice, depositing money in a bank account, buying any kind of new things or vessels, visiting temples, donating food to the poor, or help the poor with fees for their education.

Akshay Tritiya is considered one of the most auspicious days in both the Hindu and Jain religious calendars, distinguished from other festivals by the belief, worship, fasting, or the commencement of a new venture - generates inexhaustible spiritual merit that never diminishes. According to Milton, unlike most Hindu festivals, Akshaya Tritiya requires no specific astrological alignment, making it one the rare self-sufficient (svayamsiddha) auspicious moments in the Hindu calendar. The day is accordingly observed across regions and communities for a wide range of purposes including marriages, the commencement of new businesses, charitable giving, and memorial rites for deceased relatives.

== Overview ==
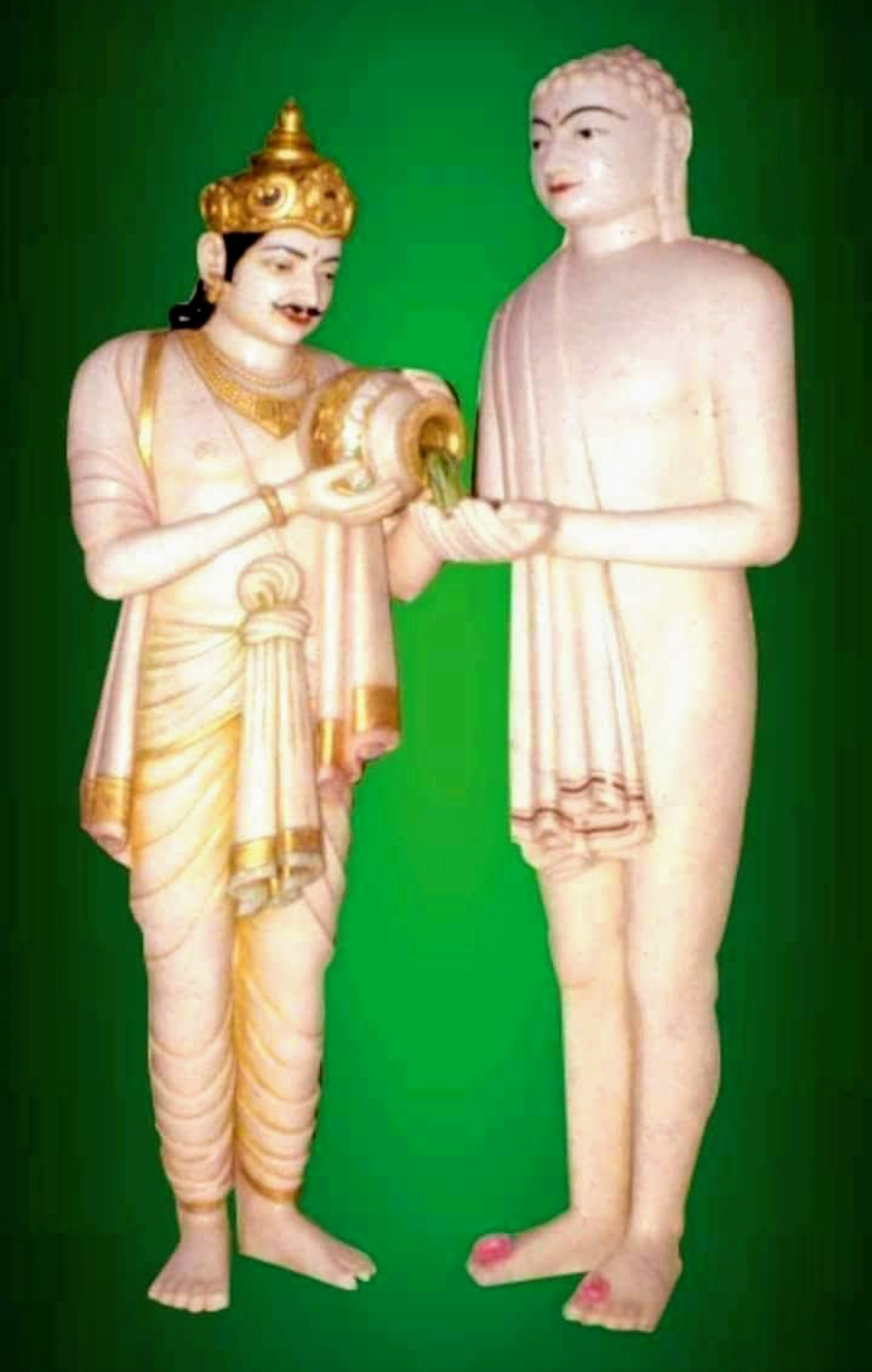
King Shreyans offering sugarcane juice to Lord Rishabhanatha

In Jainism's Śvetāmbara tradition, devotees break their 400-days-long fast with eating only on alternate days, that is meant to replicate Ṛṣabhanātha's 400-days-long fast partially. This fast is popularly known as Varśi-tapa. Sugarcane juice is consumed to break the fast. In Hinduism, this day is considered significant for women, who pray for the well-being of their husbands or their future partners. After prayers, they distribute germinating gram (sprouts), fresh fruits, and Indian sweets. If Akśaya Tṛtīyā falls on a Monday or with Rohini constellation, the festival is believed to be even more auspicious. Fasting, charity, and helping others on this day is another festive practice.

== Etymology ==
In Sanskrit, the word akṣaya (अक्षय) means "never decreasing" and is associated with "prosperity, hope, joy and success". Tr̥tīyā (तृतीया) refers to the "third day of the lunar calendar". The festival is so named because it falls on the third lunar day (tṛtīyā) of the spring month of Vaiśākha in the Hindu calendar. The term akṣaya signifies the belief that any devotion or pious act performed on this day yields benefits that never diminish.

== Jain tradition ==
In Jainism, Akshaya Tritiya is an important festival, as it commemorates the first Tirthankara, Rishabhanatha, ending a 400-day-long fast by consuming sugarcane juice poured into his cupped hands. Śvetāmbara Jains perform a similar fast known as Varshitap, which also lasts 400 days but involves eating on alternate days. According to tradition, Rishabhanatha renounced worldly pleasures to become a monkand then he fasted for 400 days. He did not accept food from lay followers because each time he was offered food, it was not 'free of faults' as required for a Jain monk to accept. The 42 faults that food given to a Jain monk may possess are discussed at length in the ancient Śvetāmbara text Ācārāṅga Sūtra.

When he was approaching Hastinapur, the capital city of King Shreyansha, the king saw a dream - A completely dark Mount Meru was turned brilliant by the sprinkling water from pitchers. King Shreyansha was the great-grandson of Rishabhanatha, the grandson of Bahubali, and the son of Somprabha. King Somprabha saw a dream where a man surrounded by enemies from all sides emerges victorious with Shreyansha's help. In the same town, Subuddhi, a merchant saw a dream where a thousand rays from the Sun were replaced by Shreyansha and as a result of this, the Sun became brighter. They all discussed their dreams in the royal assembly, but no one conclusion could be reached. Just then, Rishabhanatha entered Hastinapur. People tried to donate food and other valuable things, but he accepted none.

Shreyansha performed pradakshina around him. On looking at Rishabhanatha's attire as a Jain monk (with a white cloth on his shoulder in Śvetāmbara accounts), Shreyansha soon attained Jati Smaran Gyan (the knowledge of previous births) which also led him to know the rituals of donating food to Jain monks, which he knew in his previous births.

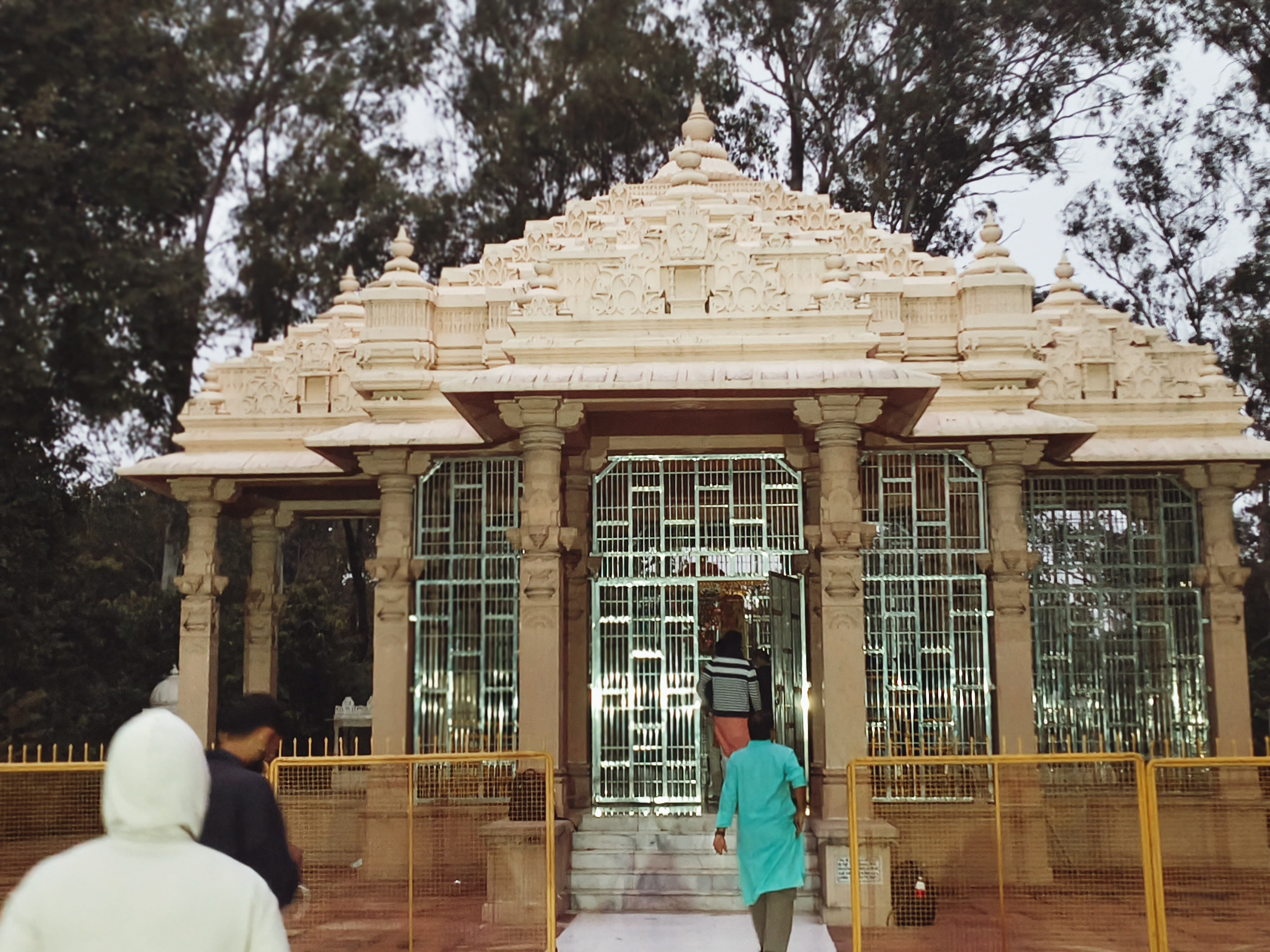
Main entrance to the shrine housing Rishabhanatha's footprints at Hastinapur.

=== King Shreyansha's previous birth ===
In his previous birth, Shreyansha was the wife of Chakravartin Vajranabha (a previous birth of Rishabhanatha) in East Videha. King Shreyansha had seen the attire of a Tirthankara adopted by King Vajranabha's father Tirthankara Vajrasena, as he had adopted mendicancy from the latter. He also remembered the procedure to donate food to a Jain monk by making sure it is free from the 42 faults listed in the scripture.

=== Rishabhanatha breaks his fast ===
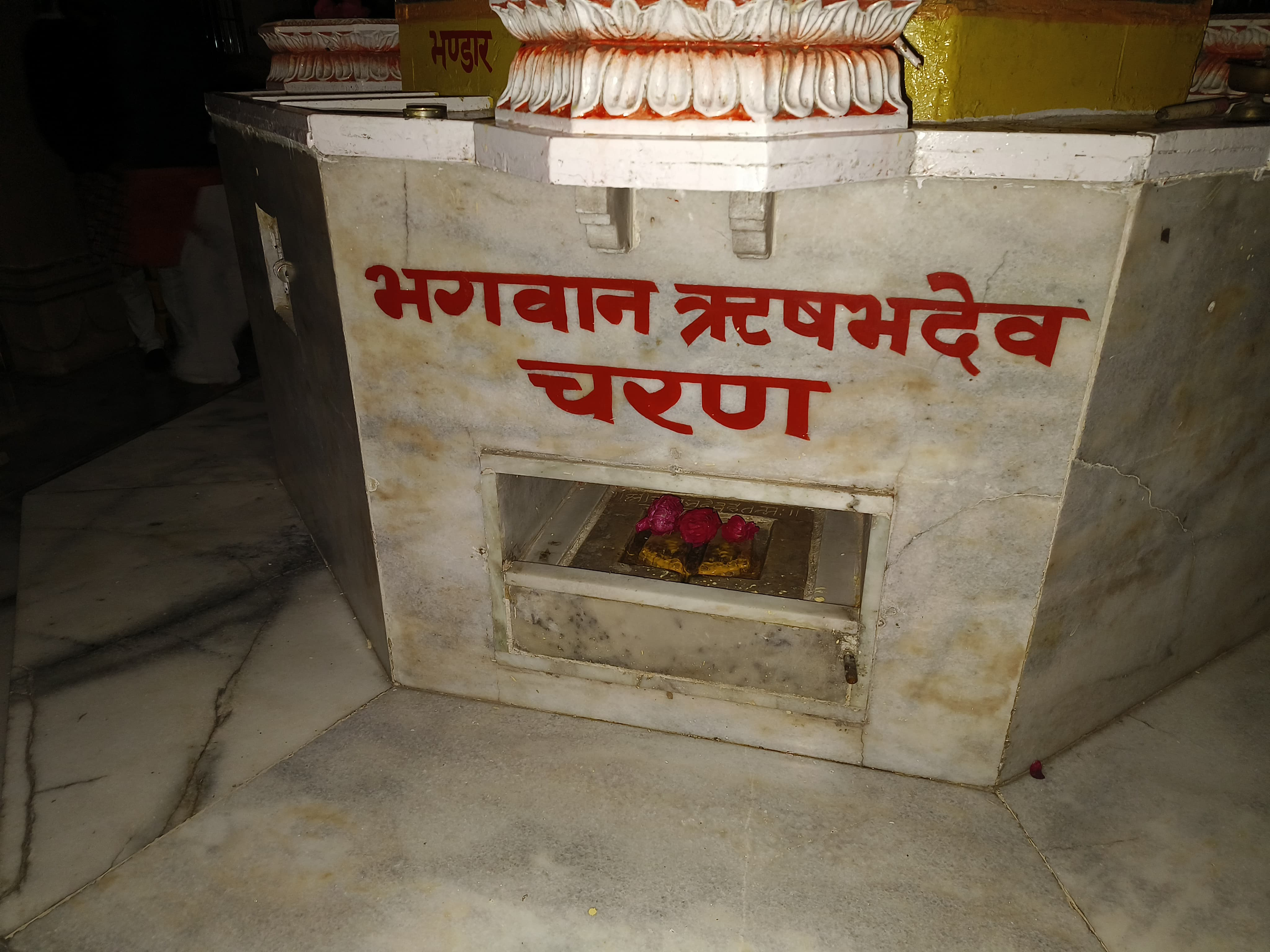
Footprints of Rishabhanatha at Hastinapur at the spot where he broke his 400-day-long fast.

Since Shreyansha knew the rules of donating food to a Jain monk, he curated jars full of sugarcane juice that was already prepared, but not for Rishabhanatha as Jain monks must only accept food that is not specially prepared for them. He then told Rishabhanatha to accept the juice as it was suitable and free from faults. Rishabhanatha put his hands together to form a dish and Shreyansha emptied the pitchers of the juice in his hand while he consumed all of it and broke his fast. Not even a single drop of juice fell on the ground as Tirthankaras possess the kar-paatra labdhi (the power to use hands as dish without wasting any food put in them). Demi-gods and other creatures celebrated this event.

On this day, Jains who observe the year-long alternate-day fasting known as varshitap finish their tapasya and break their fast by drinking sugarcane juice, particularly at pilgrimage sites associated with Rishabhanatha, such as Hastinapur, Palitana Temples, Kesariyaji Tirth, Ranakpur Jain temple, Kulpakji Tirth, and others.

== Hindu tradition ==
=== Birth of Parashurama ===
Akshaya Tritiya is believed by Hindus to be the birthday of Parashurama, the sixth avatar of the god Vishnu. He is revered in Vaishnava temples. Those who observe it in honor of Parashurama sometimes refer to the festival as Parashurama Jayanti. Alternatively, some focus their reverence on Krishna, the eighth avatar of Vishnu.

=== Other legends ===
According to one legend, the sage Vyasa began reciting the Hindu epic Mahabharata to the god Ganesha on Akshaya Tritiya.

Another legend states that the river Ganges descended to earth on this day. The Yamunotri Temple and Gangotri Temple are opened on the auspicious occasion of Akshaya Tritiya during the Chota Char Dham pilgrimage, after closing down during the heavy snowfall-laden winters of the Himalayan regions. The temples are opened on Abhijit Muhurat of Akshaya Tritya.

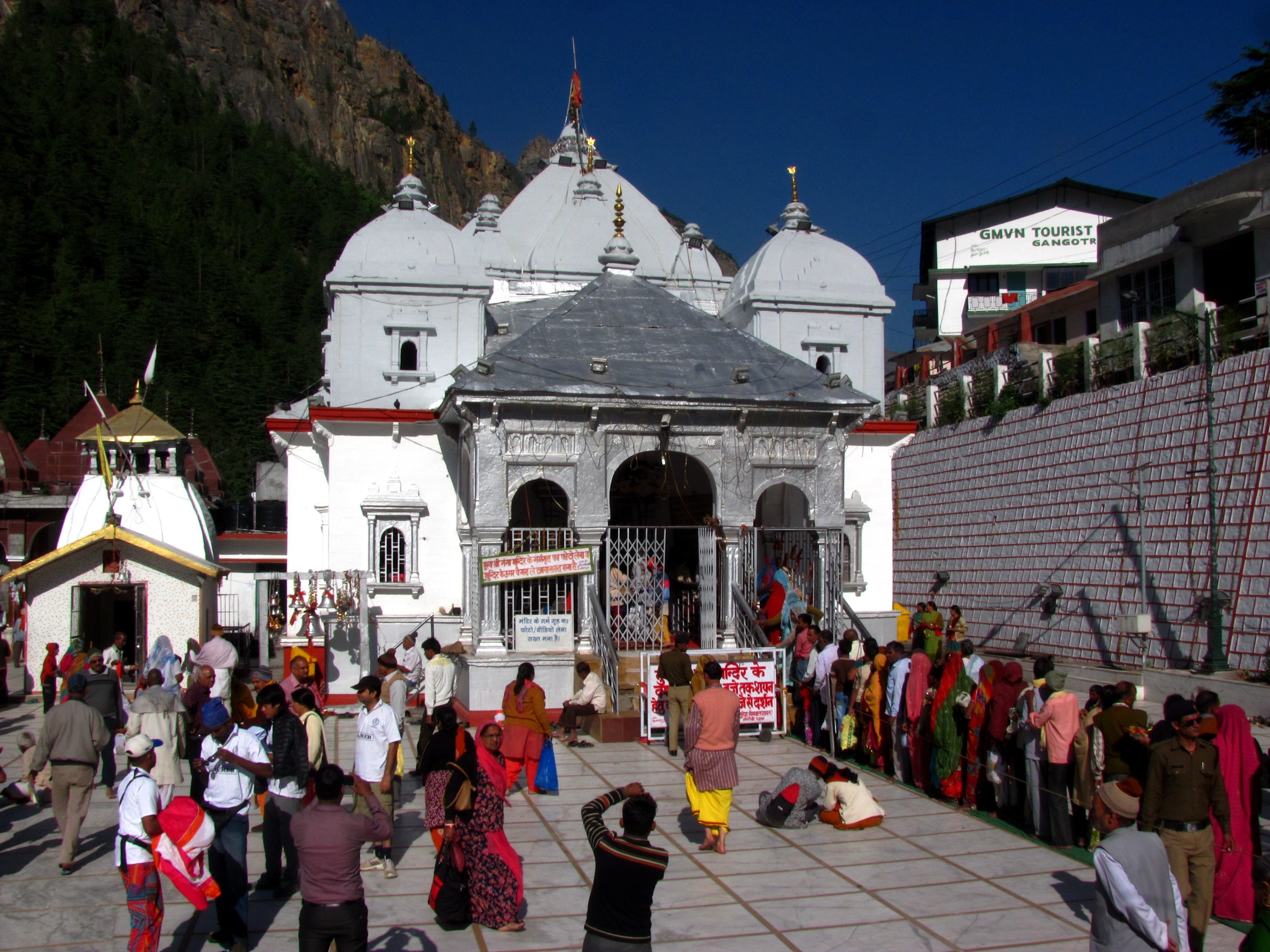
Yamunotri Temple and Gangotri Temple are opened on the auspicious occasion of Akshaya Tritiya.

Another event linked to the day is Sudama's visit to his childhood friend, Krishna in Dvaraka when he received unlimited wealth as a boon. Kubera is believed to have appointed the god of wealth on this auspicious day.

=== Regional significance ===
==== Maharashtra ====
Akshaya Tritiya is of importance in the Indian state of Maharashtra. It is one of the Sadetin Muhurtas (Three and a half auspicious and holiest festival days in the Marathi calendar). People in Maharashtra consider these days as the days to start anything new as it is believed that the work started on Akshaya Tritiya brings long lasting success. People start new businesses, buy houses and women buy gold on this day. People celebrate this festival with family, and worship gods and goddesses by offering food such as Naivedhya consisting of the Maharashtrian Puran Poli (Chapati/bread stuffed with jaggery, ghee and lentil mix) and Aamras (A thick mango puree).

==== Odisha ====
In Odisha, Akshaya Tritiya is celebrated during the commencement of the sowing of rice paddy for the ensuing Kharif season. The day starts with ritual worship of mother Earth, the bullocks, and other traditional farm equipment and seeds by the farmers for the blessings of a good harvest. After ploughing the fields, the farmers sow paddy seeds as the symbolic start for the most important Kharif crop of the state. This ritual is called Akhi Muthi Anukula (Akhi- Akshaya Tritiya; Muthi- fistful of paddy; Anukula- commencement or inauguration) and is celebrated with much fanfare throughout the state. In recent years, the event has received much publicity due to ceremonial Akhi Muthi Anukula programs organized by farmers' organizations and political parties. The construction of chariots for the Ratha Yatra festivities of Jagannath Temple at Puri also commences on this day.

==== Telangana and Andhra Pradesh ====
In the Telugu-speaking states of Telangana and Andhra Pradesh, the festival is associated with prosperity and charity. Simhachalam temple observes special festive rituals on this day. The main deity of the temple is covered in sandalwood paste for the rest of the year, and only on this day are the layers of sandalwood applied to the deity removed to show the underlying statue. Display of the actual form or Nija Roopa Darsanam happens on this day.

== See also ==
- Visakha Puja, in Buddhism
- Paryushana
- Palitana temples
