= Parshuram Mandir, Mokama =

Parshuram temple in Bihar

Parshuram Mandir
- परशुराम मंदिर

Religion
- Affiliation: Hinduism
- District: Patna district
- Deity: Lord Parshuram

Location
- Location: Mokama
- State: Bihar
- Country: India
- Temple of Lord Parshuram in Mokama

Parshuram Mandir (Devanagari: परशुराम मंदिर) in Mokama is an ancient temple dedicated to Lord Parshuram in Hinduism. According to legend, the place of the temple is believed to be the penance site of Lord Parshuram during Treta Yuga. It is an important teertha for Hindu pilgrims in the state of Bihar. It is famous for organizing Parshuram Janmostav or Parshuram Mahotsav festival every year on the occasion of the birth anniversary of Lord Parshuram. During the festival, a grand fair is held in the campus of the temple. The grand fair is locally known as Parshuram Utsav Mela and has got status of state festival. The state festival of Parshuram Mahotsav is a seven-day festive event and program dedicated to the devotion of Lord Parshuram.

== Description ==
The Parshuram Mandir in Mokama is hundreds years old. On the occasion of Akshay Tritiya, a grand celebration of Parshuram Janmostav is organised at the temple premises. It is believed that any devotee who comes to this temple with a true heart, all his wishes are fulfilled. A large number of devotees from India as well as from abroad come here to have darshan and worship of Lord Parshuram.

== Legend ==
Once, a Mughal king was passing by the temple then he heard sound of drums. At that time, devotees in the temple were engrossed in worshipping Lord Parshuram. Hearing the sound, the king went to the temple and called the worship a mere show. Then the priest of the temple told the king that let them performed the worship. Listening the priest's words, the king killed a cow there and asked the priest that if his God really exists, then he should brought the life of the cow back. After getting the challenge from the king, the priest started chanting mantras and sprinkled water on the dead cow, then after a moment the cow became alive and its calf, standing nearby, began to drink her milk. The king become very astonished seeing the cow alive. It is said that the priest cursed the king that the place from where he had come would be destroyed. According to adherents, it is said that the curse of the priest became true and the place from where the king came was destroyed.

== Upgrade ==
On 30 April 2025, the deputy chief minister Samrat Choudhary of the Bihar Government announced that the temple will developed as a tourist destination in the state of Bihar. Similarly the Urban Development Minister Jiwesh Kumar announced to construct a Vivah Mandap (wedding hall) in the premises of the temple. The second deputy chief minister Vijay Sinha of the Bihar Government announced to construct a grand temple of Lord Parshuram. On 28 September 2025, the Government of Bihar took a historic decision to renovate the premises of the ancient temple and approved a budget of amount Rs 18 crore for the development project of the ancient temple.
