= Parashurama Jayanti =

Hindu festival

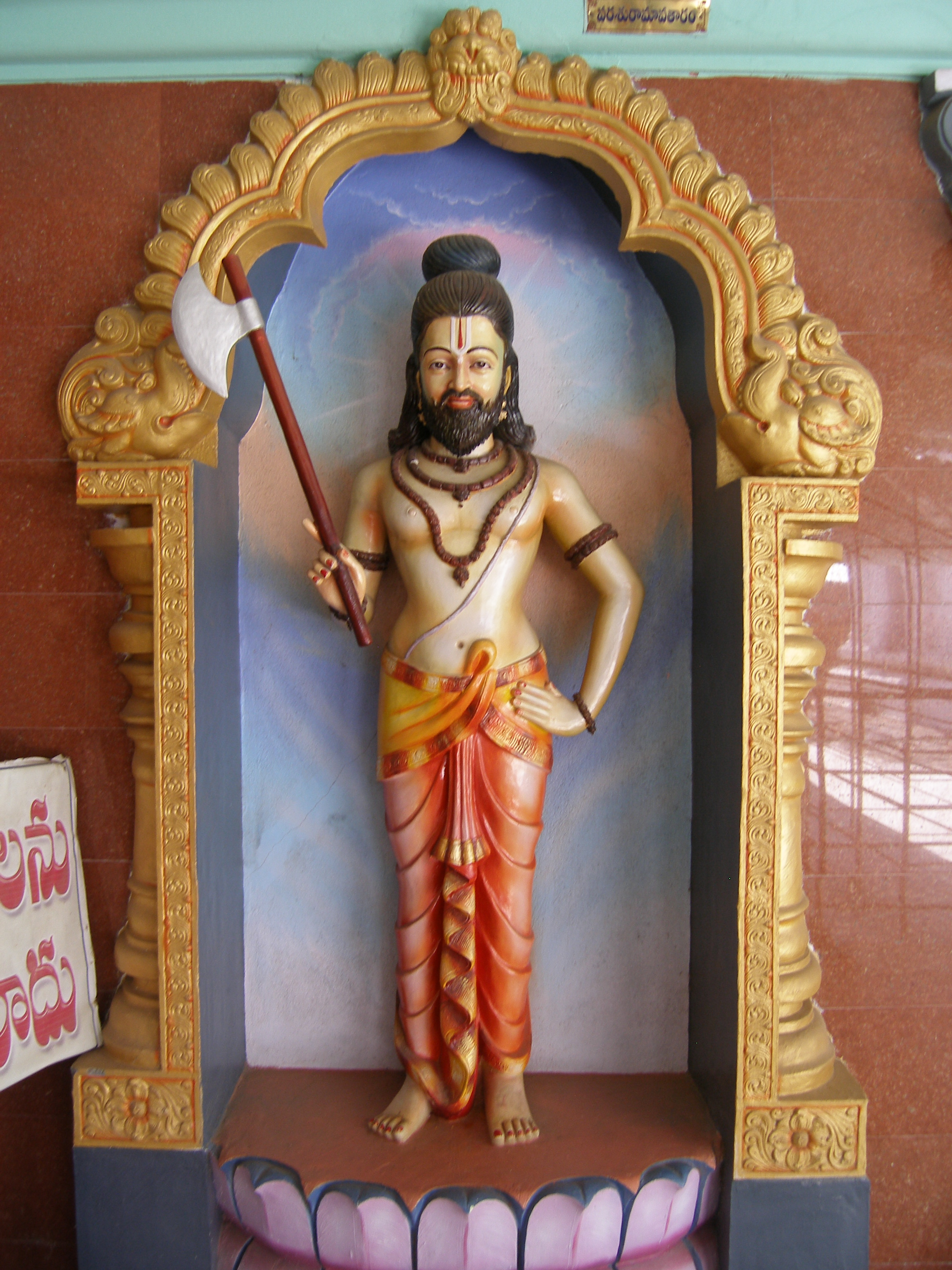
- Statue of Parashurama, Tirumala
- Also called: Parashurama Janmotsava
- Observed by: Hindus, especially Vaishnavas
- Significance: Commemorate the birth anniversary of Lord Parashurama
- Observances: Puja, fasting, scripture recitations, temple rituals, pilgrimage Parashurama
- Date: Vaisakha Shukla Paksha Tritiya (3rd day of the Hindu month Vaisakha)
- 2025 date: 30th April
- 2026 date: 19th April
- 2027 date: 8th May
- Frequency: Annual
- Related to: Akshaya Tritiya

Parashurama Jayanti (Sanskrit: परशुरामजयंती, romanized: Paraśurāmajayantī) is a Hindu festival observed to celebrate the birth of Parashurama, the sixth incarnation of Vishnu. It is celebrated every year on Akshaya Tritiya, falling on the tritiya tithi (third lunar day) of the Shukla Paksha (first lunar fortnight) in the Hindu month of Vaisakha.

== Description ==
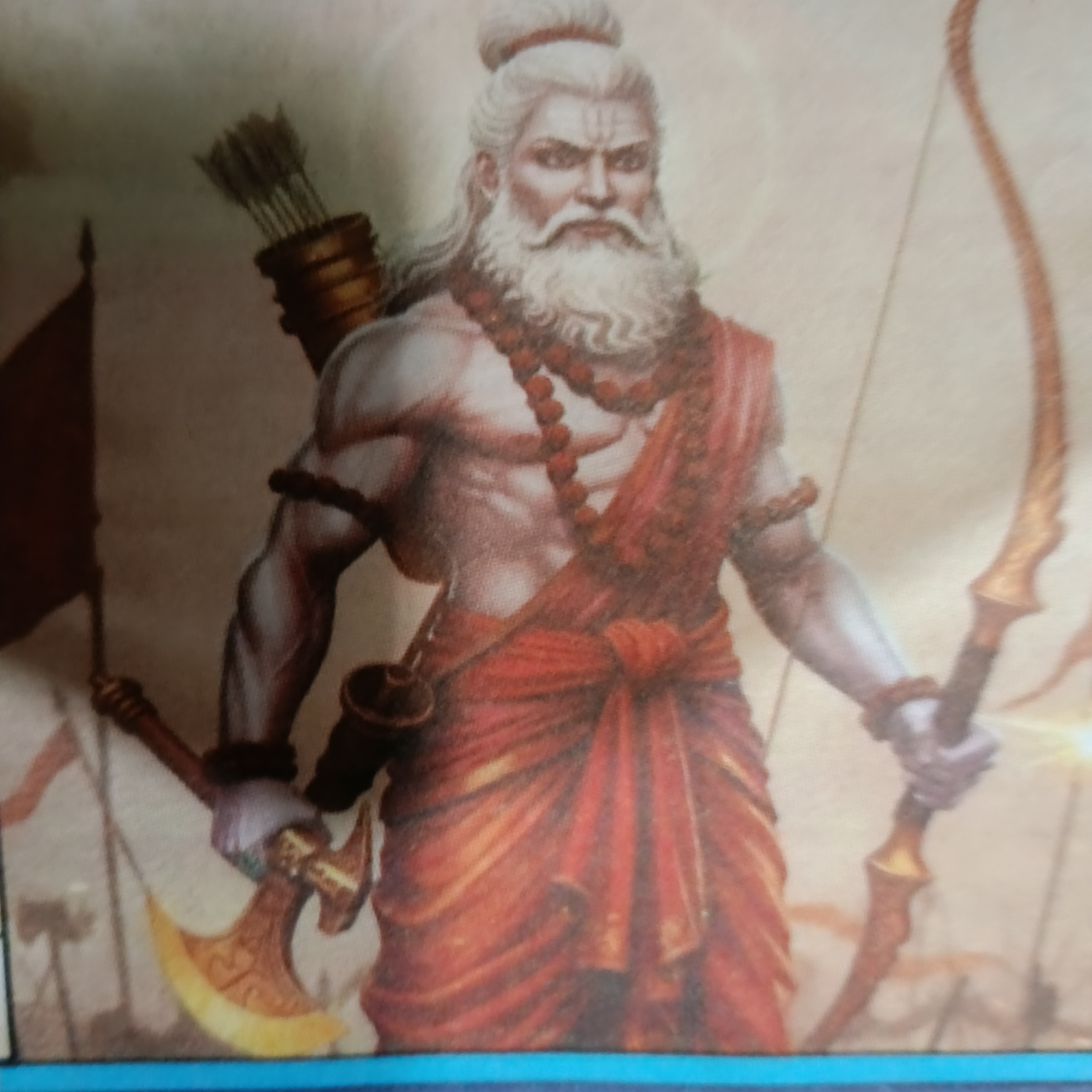
Poster of Parshuram Rishi

It is believed that Parashurama was born on Akshaya Tritiya during the occasion of Pradosha. According to the Skanda Purana and the Bhavishya Purana, Vishnu was born as the son of the rishi (sage) Jamadagni and Renuka. The Brahmanda Purana describes the earth goddess Bhumi assuming the form of a cow to appeal to Vishnu to save her from the atrocities committed upon her by kings, who belonged to the Kshatriya class. The deity incarnated as Parashurama as a member of the Brahmin class, raised in his father's ashram and receiving Vedic education. As a child, he was blessed by the deity Shiva with a parashu (axe). When his father was slain in an attempt to protect his cow Kamadhenu from theft by a king named Kartavirya Arjuna, Parashurama swore vengeance and vowed to end the persecution of innocents. After killing Kartavirya Arjuna and his sons, he toured the land of Bharata twenty-one times, massacring kings of every Kshatriya lineage he came across in his path in a number of wars. He halted his destruction when his Bhargava ancestors appealed to him to show mercy to the surviving monarchs; he distributed the lands of his conquests to Brahmins, and started to perform a penance at the mountain called Mahendragiri. Parashurama is regarded to be a chiranjivi (immortal), prophesied to be the mentor of the tenth avatar of Vishnu, Kalki.

== Observances ==
Devotees of Parashurama fast on this day as a spiritual practice, denoting discipline. They share stories of the deity’s bravery and righteousness. On this occasion, bhajans, kirtans, and recitations are organised by adherents. Worship and havans are performed in different Parashurama temples. Bhandara Prasad is distributed to devotees. Shobha Yatras and Kalash Yatras are also taken out from different places in different cities, in which a large number of devotees participate.

The Tantric texts of the Parashurama Kalpasutra and the Parashurama Pratapa are recited by adherents.

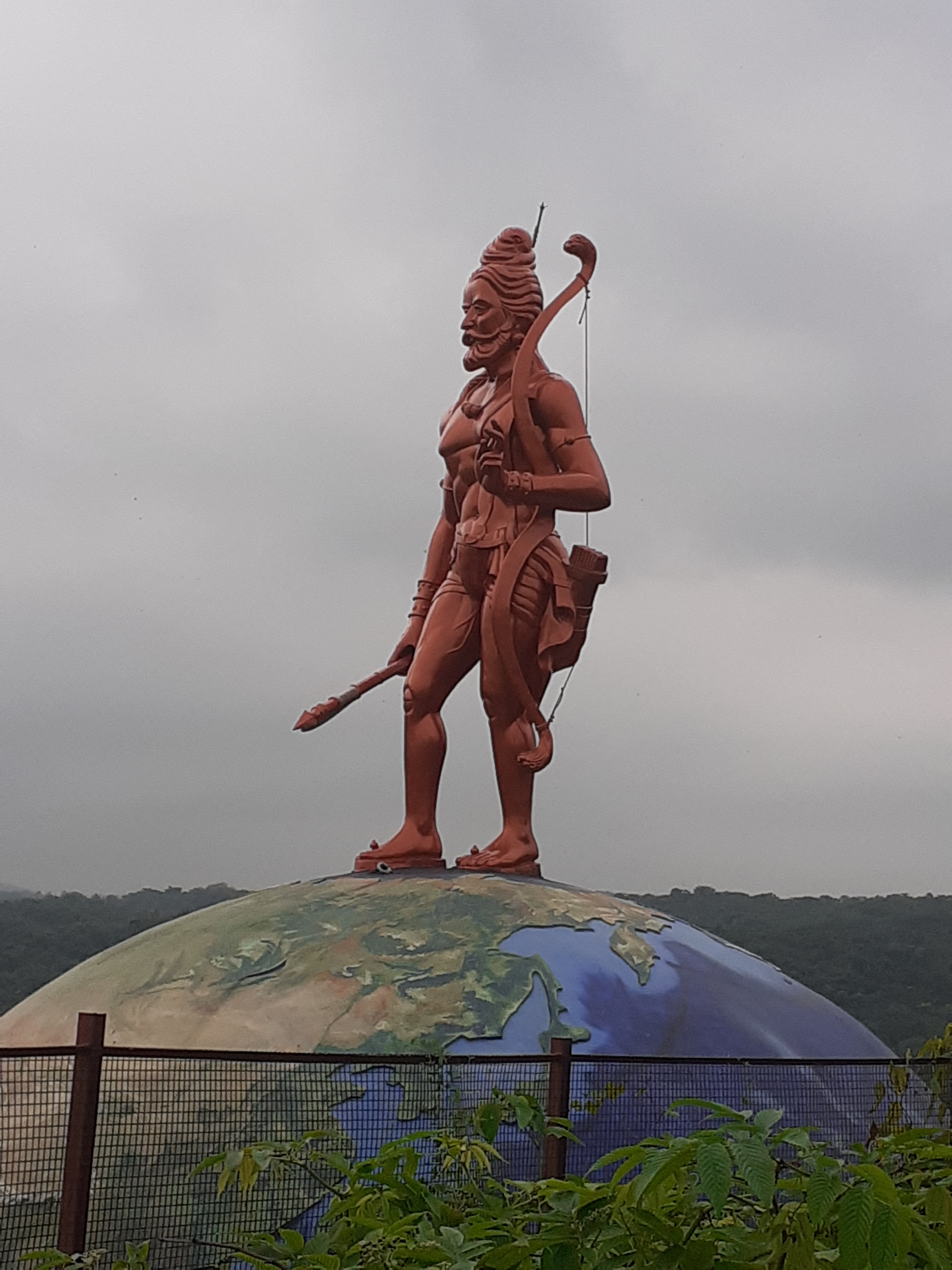
Statue of Parashurama at Burondi village near Dapoli, Maharashtra

The Parashurama Jayanti celebration at Parshuram Mandir in Mokama has received status of a state festival by the Bihar Government due to the popularity of the grand Kalash Yatra organised there every year. In the state of Himachal Pradesh, there is public holiday on the occasion of the Parshuram Jayanti.

== See also ==
- Akshaya Tritiya
- Hanuman Jayanti
- Narasimha Jayanti
