= Chota Char Dham =

Hindu pilgrimage circuit of four sites in India

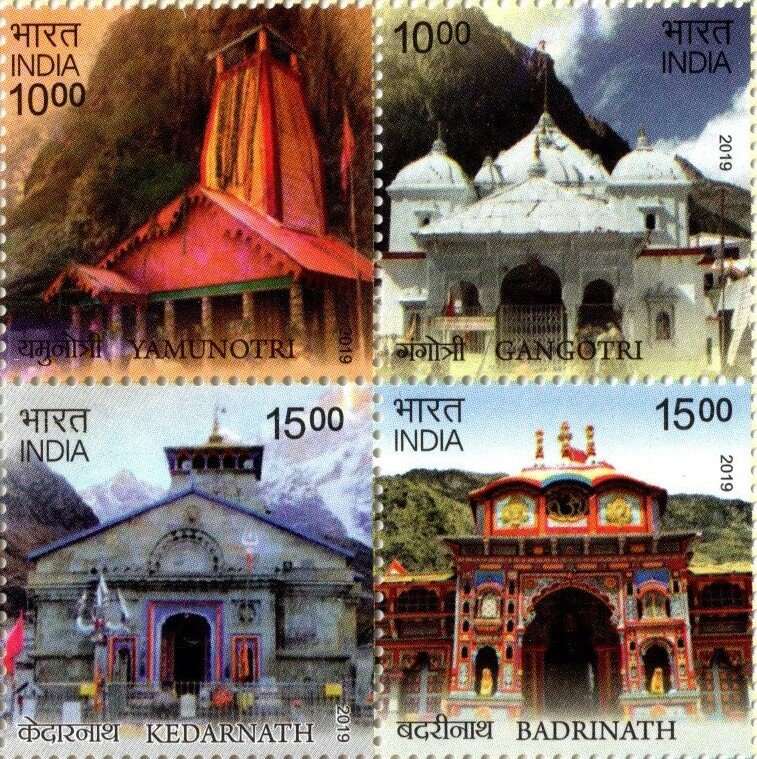

Religion
- Affiliation: Hinduism
- Deity: Vishnu (Badrinath); Shiva (Kedarnath); Ganga (Gangotri); Yamuna (Yamunotri)

Location
- State: Uttarakhand
- Country: India

Architecture
- Type: North Indian architecture
- Completed: Unknown

The Chota Char Dham (lit. 'the small four abodes/seats' or 'the small circuit of four abodes/seats') is an important modern Hindu pilgrimage circuit in the state of Uttarakhand, in the Indian Himalayas. Located in the Garhwal region, the circuit consists of four sites—Gangotri, Yamunotri, Kedarnath, and Badrinath. Badrinath is also one of the four destinations (with each destination being in different corners of the country) of the historical and longer Char Dham from which the Chota Char Dham draws its name.

Akshaya Tritiya (April or May in the Gregorian calendar) marks the beginning of the Chota Char Dham Yatra and closes two days after Diwali, on the day of Bhai-Bij (or Bhai Dooj) Visitor numbers peak in May and June; travel becomes hazardous during the monsoon months of late July and August, when heavy rain raises the risk of roadblocks and landslides.

Due to 2013 Uttarakhand floods it was suspended for 3-4 months. The footfall has now improved due to proactive measures taken by the government of Uttarakhand. In 2022, in just two months (10 June – 10 August), 2.8 million pilgrims have visited these Dhams.

A record 4.1 million pilgrims visited Chota Char dham in 2022. Over 1.4 million pilgrims have already visited Kedarnath, over 600,000 have visited Gangotri, and over 500,000 have visited Yamunotri. Around 1.5 million pilgrims have already visited Badrinath the same year.

As per latest reports 6 million pilgrims visited in 2026.

== Origins and the original Char Dham ==
Originally, the appellation Char Dham referred to a pilgrimage circuit encompassing four important temples cities — Puri, Rameswaram, Dwarka, and Badrinath — located roughly at the four cardinal points of the subcontinent. An archetypal All-India pilgrimage circuit, the formation of the original Char Dham is credited to the great 8th century reformer and philosopher Shankaracharya (Adi Sankara). In the original Char Dham, three of the four sites are Vaishnava (Puri, Dwarka and Badrinath) while one is Shaiva (Rameswaram). The four Garhwal sites were first named together in print in 1917, when Harikrishna Raturi, an adviser to Narendra Shah of Tehri Garhwal, listed Gangotri, Yamunotri, Badrinath and Kedarnath as Garhwal's "four main pilgrim centres" in The Narendra Hindu Law.

The Chota Char Dham appeared in the second half of the 20th century, as a touristic (religious tourism) label coined for a new pilgrimage circuit in the Garhwal Himalayas region, which is said to be representative of all three major Hindu sectarian traditions, with two Shakti (goddess) sites, (Yamunotri and Gangotri), one Shaiva site (Kedarnath), and one Vaishnava site (Badrinath).

Accessible until the 1950s only by arduous and lengthy walking trails in hilly area with height repeatedly exceeded 4000 meters, the sanctuairies constituting the nowadays Chota Char Dham were regularly visited by wandering ascetics and other religious people, and those who could afford a traveling entourage. While the individual sites and the ancient pilgrimage paths conducting to these were well known to Hindus on the plains below, they were not a particularly visible aspect of yearly religious culture. After the 1962 war between India and China, accessibility to these isolated places improved, as India undertook massive road building to border area and other infrastructure investments. As pilgrims were able to travel in mini buses, jeeps and cars to nearest points of four shrines, the Chota Char dham circuit was within the reach of people with middle income. Vehicles reach up to Badrinath temple and Gangotri, Yamunotri and Kedarnath are at a distance of 10 to 15 km from nearest motorable road. The Chota Char Dham pilgrimage circuit is promoted by Indian Central Government and the State of Uttarakhand, in service of both governments plans of economic development and infrastructure planning in this sensitive mountainous region. Its placemaking and promotion is also part of the rise of new forms of religious practices and political ideas, characteristic of certain dominant branches of Hindu nationalism.

== Administration ==
When the East India Company took control of eastern Garhwal in 1815, the region was divided: Kedarnath and Badrinath, both long established and widely known, fell within directly ruled British Garhwal, while Gangotri and Yamunotri, then small and undeveloped, lay in the princely state of Tehri Garhwal. The two halves developed separate systems of temple administration. In British Garhwal the Badrinath temple came under a committee constituted by the United Provinces Shri Badrinath Temple Act, 1939; that committee, the Badri-Kedar Samiti, later oversaw Kedarnath and other temples in the area. The temples of the former Tehri Garhwal territory remained largely in the hands of hereditary priests, who devised their own procedures. The two arrangements coexisted until 2019.

In 2019 the Uttarakhand government enacted the Char Dham Devasthanam Management Act, which displaced the Badri-Kedar Samiti and created a single statewide board with authority over all four Chota Char Dham sites and 49 other temples. The Uttarakhand High Court upheld the Act in July 2020, holding that the board's authority was confined to the administration and management of temple properties. Following sustained protest by temple priests and their supporters, the state government withdrew the Act in November 2021.

== Recent development ==
The Chota Char Dham has become an important destination for pilgrims from throughout South Asia and the diaspora. Today, the circuit receives hundreds of thousands of visitors in an average pilgrimage season, which lasts from approximately 15 April until Diwali (sometime in November). The season is heaviest in the two-month period before the monsoon, which normally comes in late July. After the rains begin, travel to the sites becomes extremely dangerous. Even before the rains begin, safety is a major concern, as extensive road building and heavy traffic have critically destabilized the rocks, making fatal landslides and bus/jeep accidents a regular occurrence. Mortality rates for a season often surpass 200.

Some pilgrims also visit the sites after the rains ends and before the sites become impassable due to snow. Although temperatures at the shrines in the early winter months of October and November are inhospitable, it is said that the mountain scenery surrounding the sites is most vivid after the rains have had a chance to moisten the dust of the plains below.

The 2013 North India floods caused extensive damage across the circuit. Torrential rain and flash flooding in June 2013 devastated much of the region, and the town of Kedarnath was almost entirely destroyed; the Kedarnath Temple and a few adjacent buildings survived, though the surrounding area was buried in rock and debris. Since this incident, several criticisms have been raised regarding the mass tourism and the impacts induced by this pilgrimage circuit. In particular the negative effects on the environment of the Garhwal Himalayas and on its resident populations. Landslides and land subsidence in the region, for example in Joshimath, have particularly increased under the influence of large development projects that are not adapted to local conditions, such as the Chota Char Dham Highway.

Chota Char Dham Railway project's 321 km long construction, costing INR432.92 billion (US$6.6 billion), commenced with Final Location Survey (FSL) by the government of India in May 2017.

== Incidents ==
Helicopter shuttle services operate on the pilgrimage routes, principally to Kedarnath. In June 2025 an Aryan Aviation helicopter carrying pilgrims from Kedarnath to Guptakashi crashed near Gaurikund in Rudraprayag district, killing all seven people on board; the state government suspended helicopter services for two days.

== Pilgrimage ==
Pilgrimage

Access to the pilgrimage is either from Haridwar, or Rishikesh, or from Dehradun. The tradition is to visit the sites in the following order:

1. Yamunotri: the source of the Yamuna River and the head of the goddess Yamuna.
2. Gangotri: the source of the Ganges (River Ganga) and head of the goddess Ganga.
3. Kedarnath: The temple of Kedarnath is dedicated to Shiva, one of the main deities in Hinduism. The temple is one of the 12 Jyotirlingas or “pillars of light.” It is believed to have been built by the Pandavas. This is also the foremost of the Panch Kedar Temples in Uttarakhand.
4. Badrinath: the seat of the Hindu god Vishnu in his aspect of Badrinarayan, one of the 108 Divya Desams.

Gangotri and Badrinath are accessible directly by road. However, in order to go to Kedarnath or Yamunotri, most pilgrims rent out alternative transportation methods like horses to travel the last few kilometres. In Kedarnath there is also a government run helicopter service.
