= Yamunotri Temple =

Hindu Temple in Uttarakhand, India

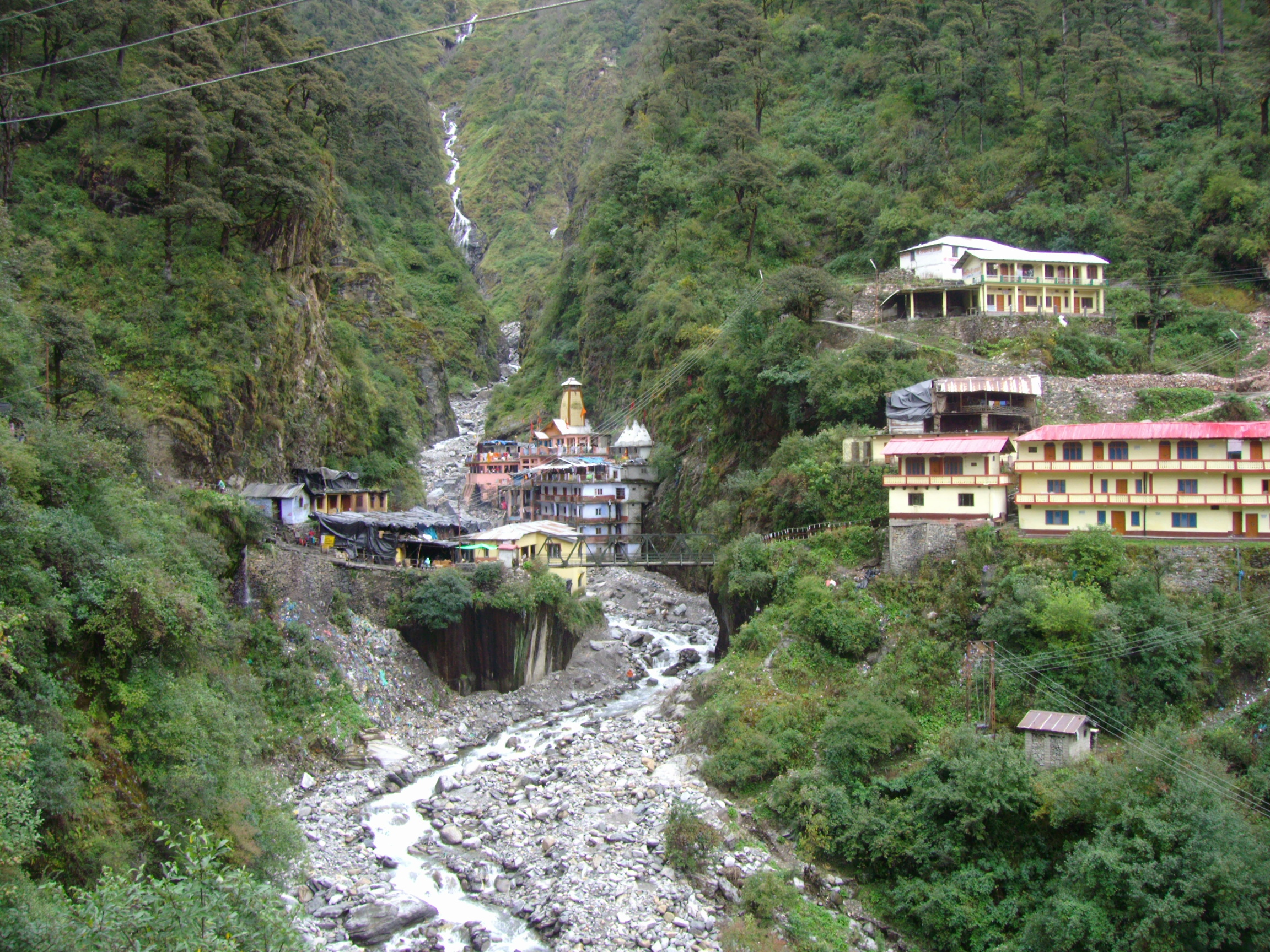
- Yamunotri temple and ashrams

- Location in Uttarakhand Location in India

Religion
- Affiliation: Hinduism
- District: Uttarkashi
- Deity: Yamuna

Location
- State: Uttarakhand
- Country: India
- Coordinates: 31°1′0.12″N 78°27′0″E

Architecture
- Creator: Maharaja Pratap Shah of Tehri Garhwal
- Completed: 19th century
- Elevation: 3,291 m (10,797 ft)

Chota Char Dham

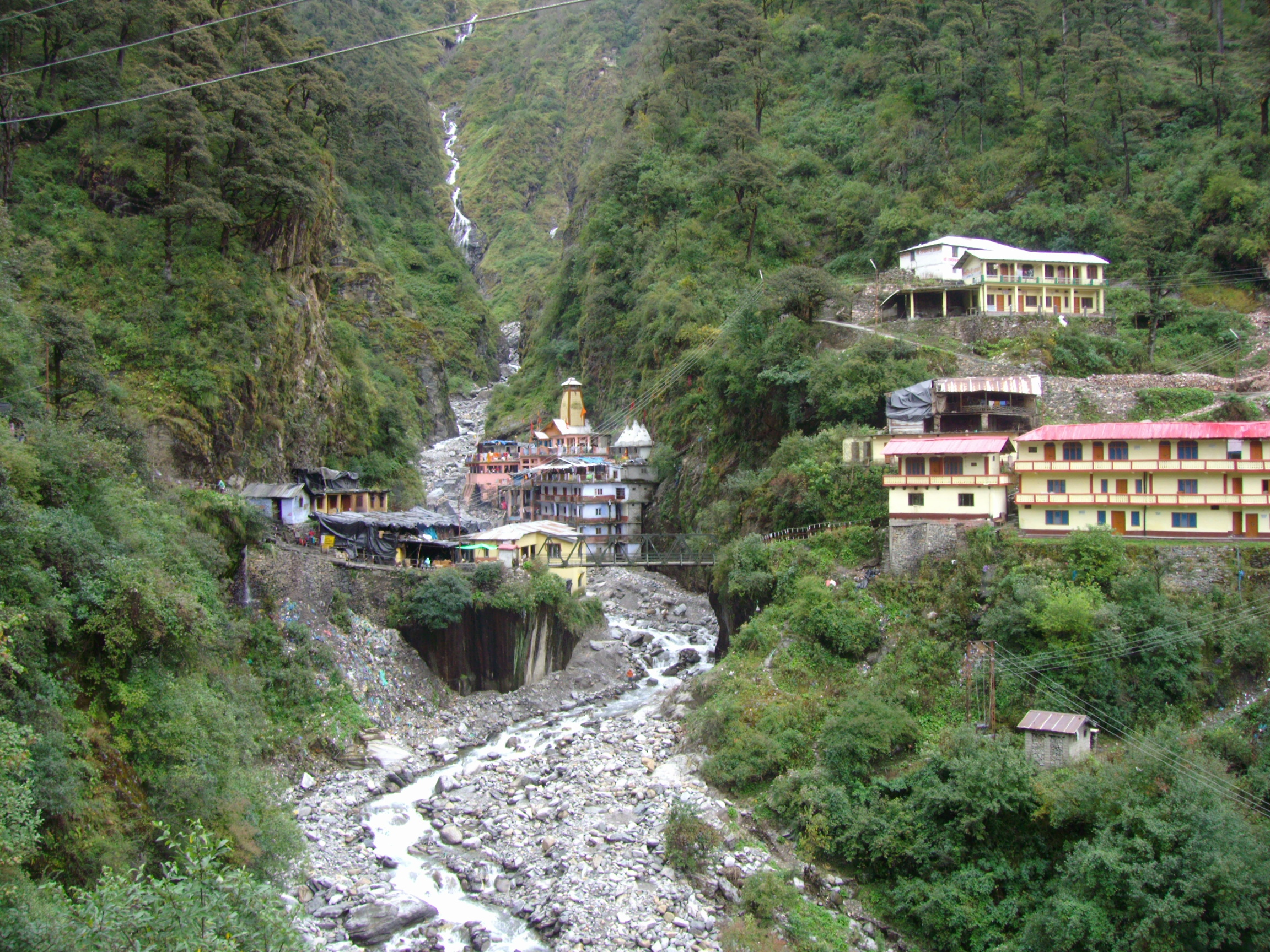
Yamunotri

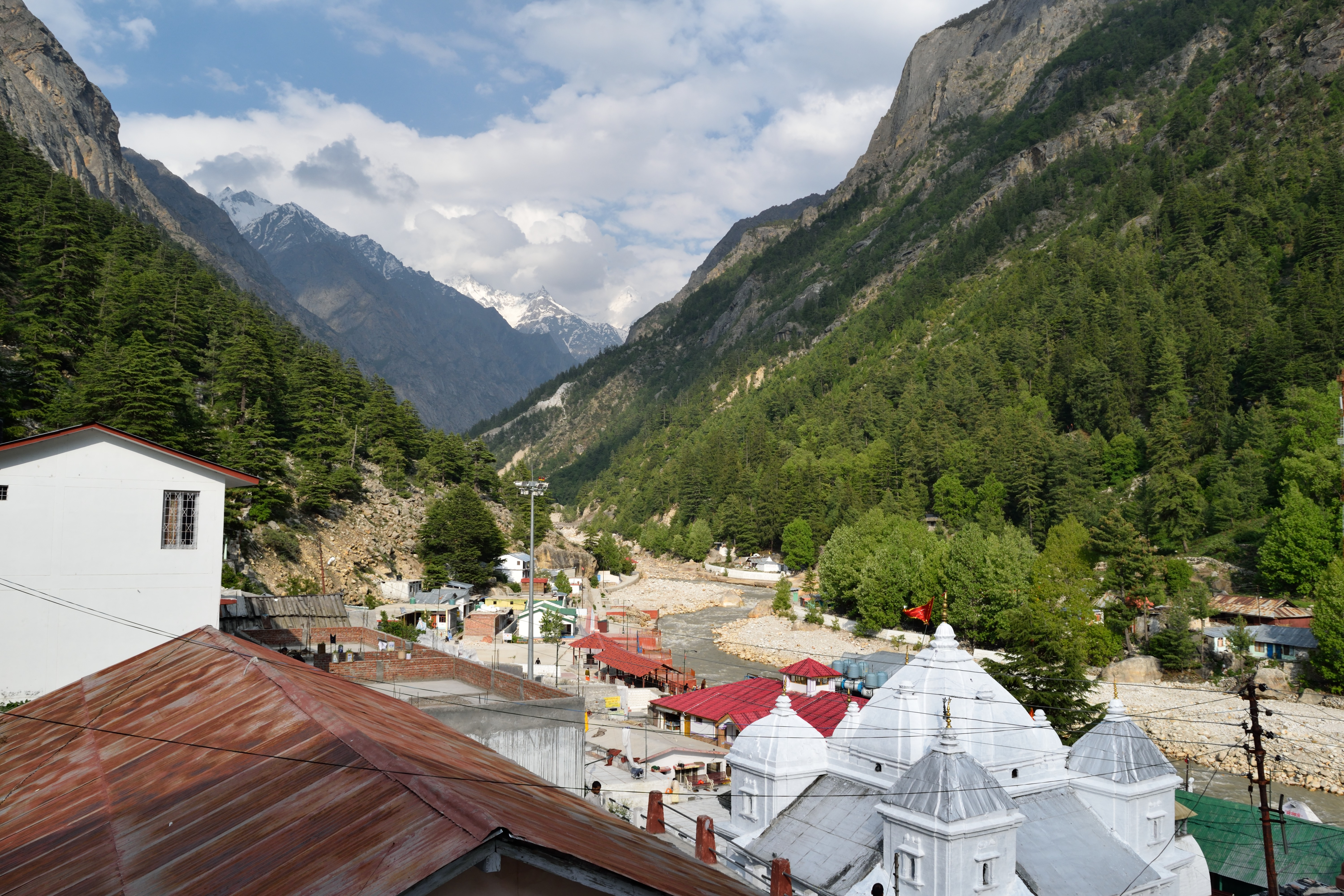
Gangotri

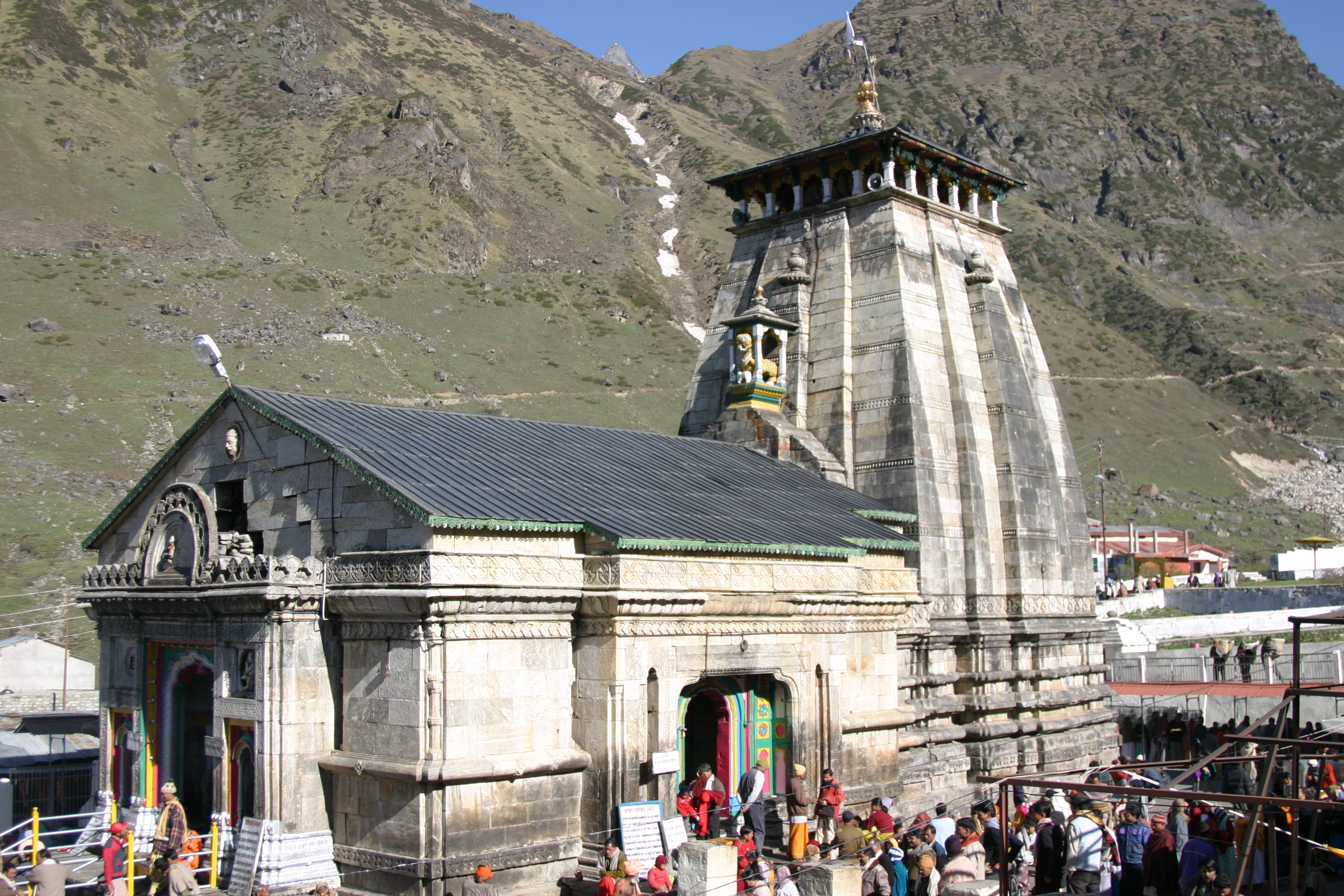
Kedarnath

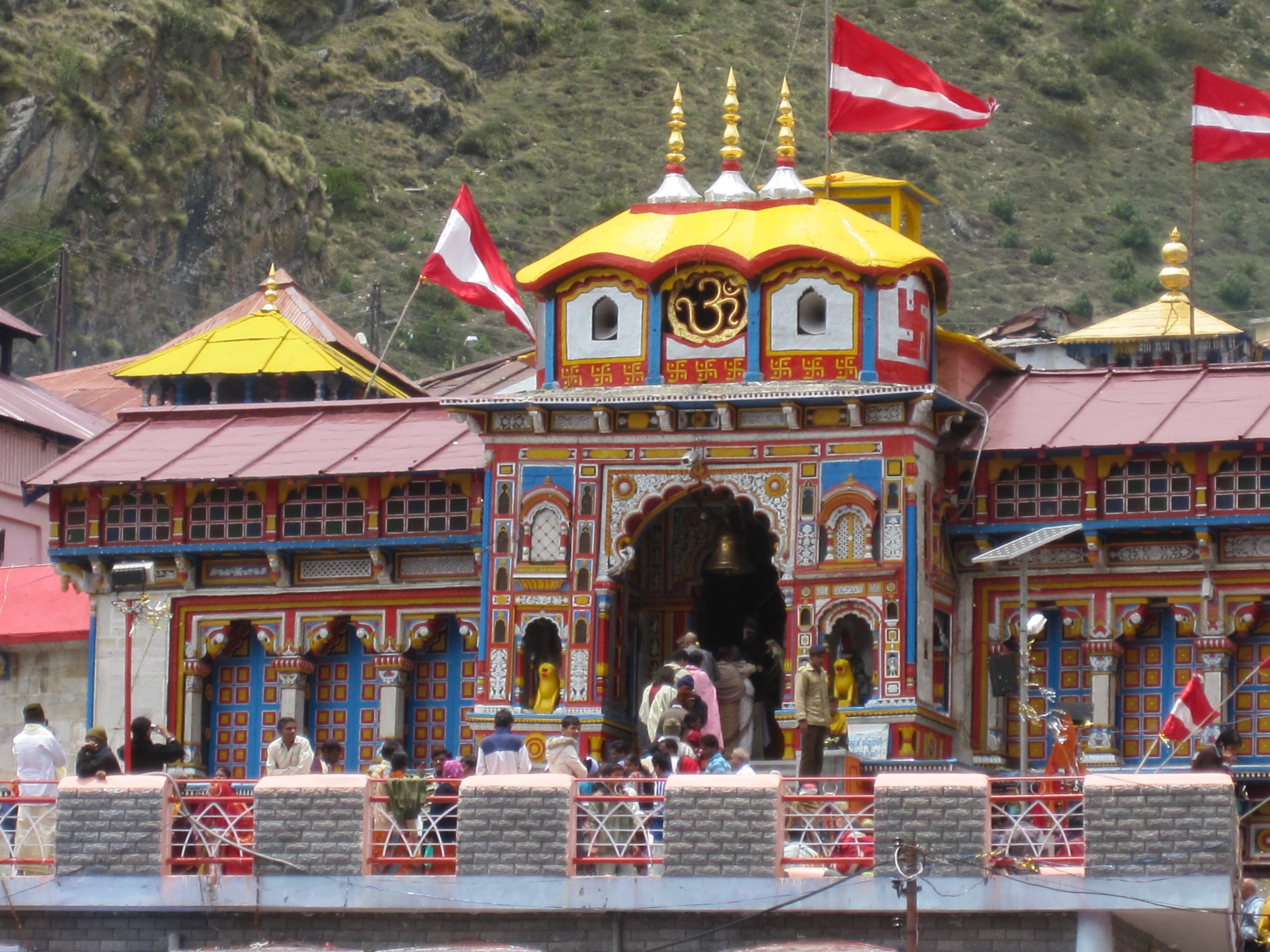
Badrinath

Yamunotri Temple is a Hindu temple, in the western region of Garhwal Himalayas at an altitude of 3,291 metres (10,797 ft) in Uttarkashi district, Uttarakhand, India. It is dedicated to Yamuna and has a black marble idol of her. The temple has been destroyed twice by snow and floods before being rebuilt. It is part of the Char Dham pilgrimage circuit.

== Temple and vicinity ==
The temple opens on Akshaya Tritiya (May) and closes on Yama Dwitiya (the second day after Diwali, November) for the winter. There is a spring whose water is said to be hot enough to cook rice and potatoes.
