= Gangotri =

Town in Uttarakhand, India

- Town
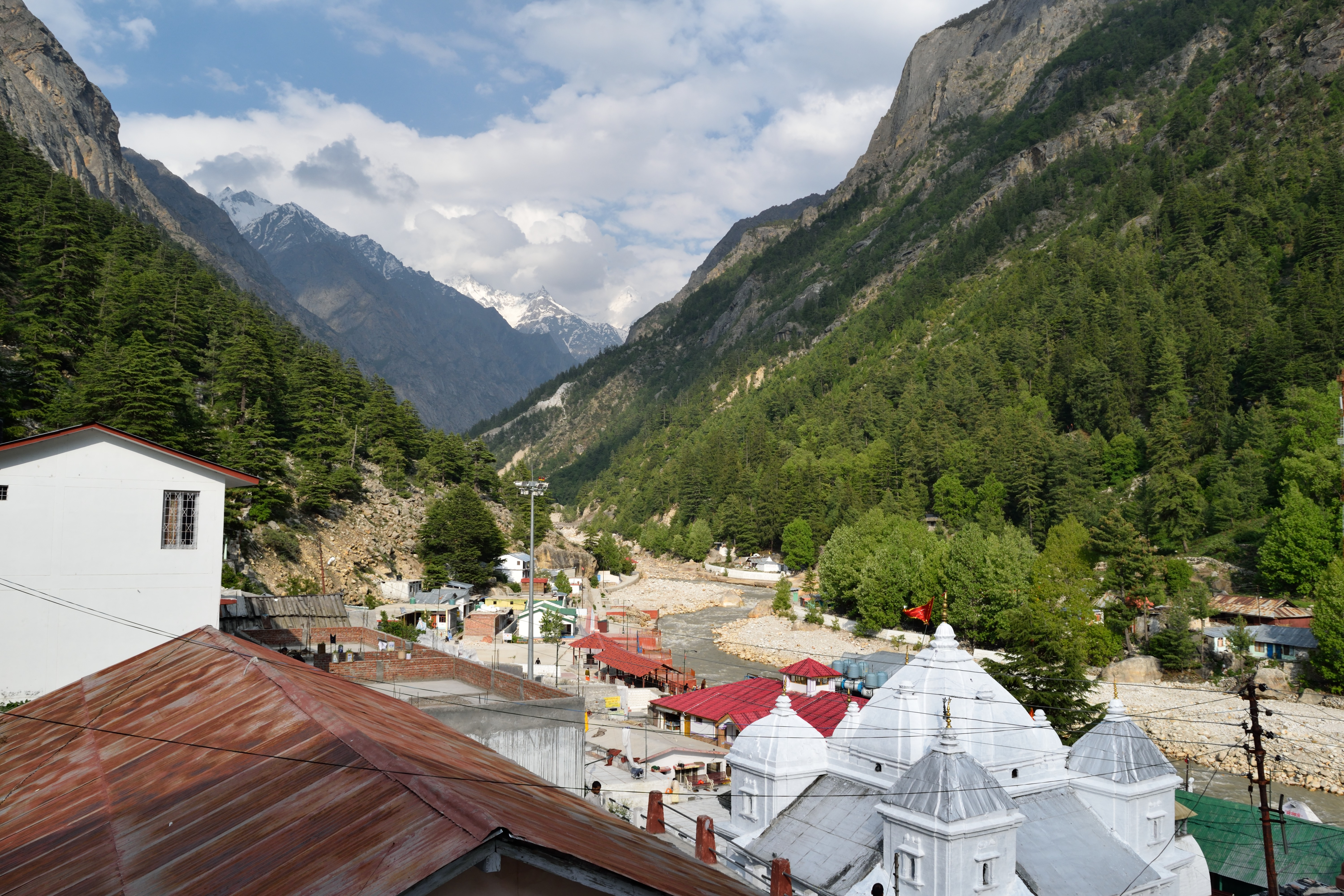
- Gangotri
- Interactive map of Gangotri
- Location in Uttarakhand, India Gangotri (India)
- Coordinates: 30.994°N 78.941°E
- Country: India
- State: Uttarakhand
- District: Uttarkashi
- Elevation: 3,415 m (11,204 ft)

Population (2001)
  - Total: 606

Languages
  - Official: Hindi
  - Native: Bhotia
- Time zone: UTC+5:30 (IST)
- Vehicle registration: UK
- Website: badrinath-kedarnath.gov.in

Chota Char Dham

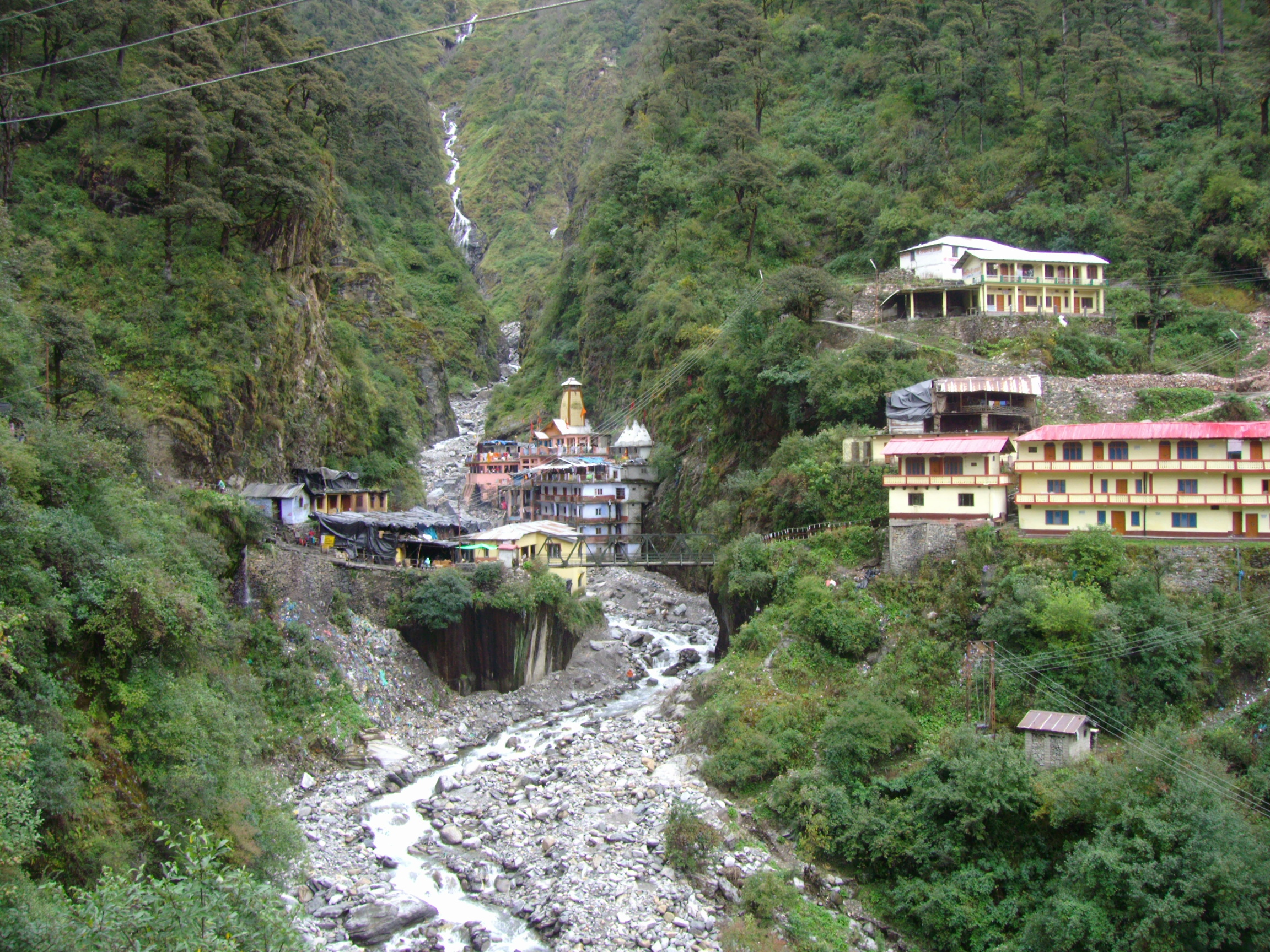
Yamunotri

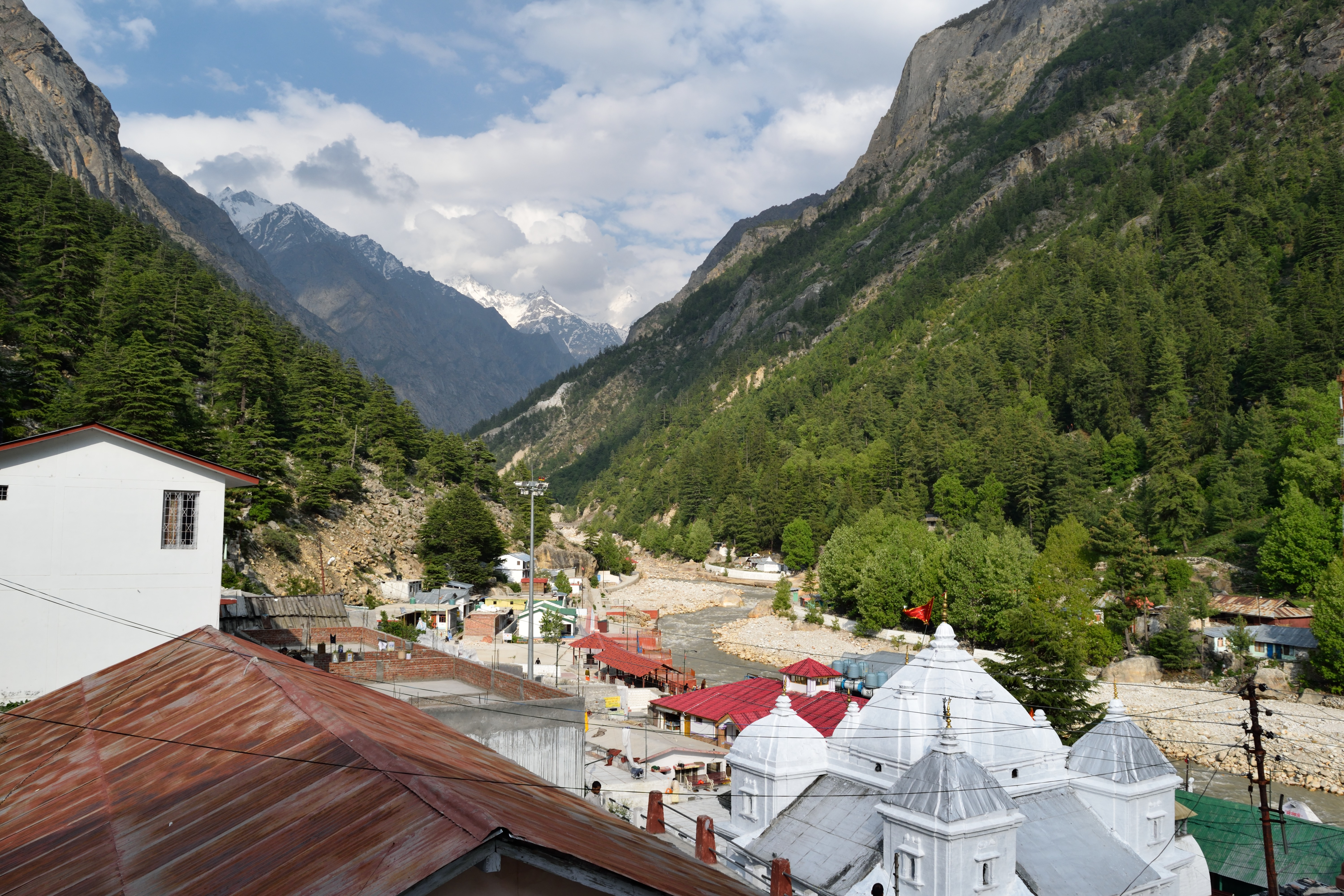
Gangotri

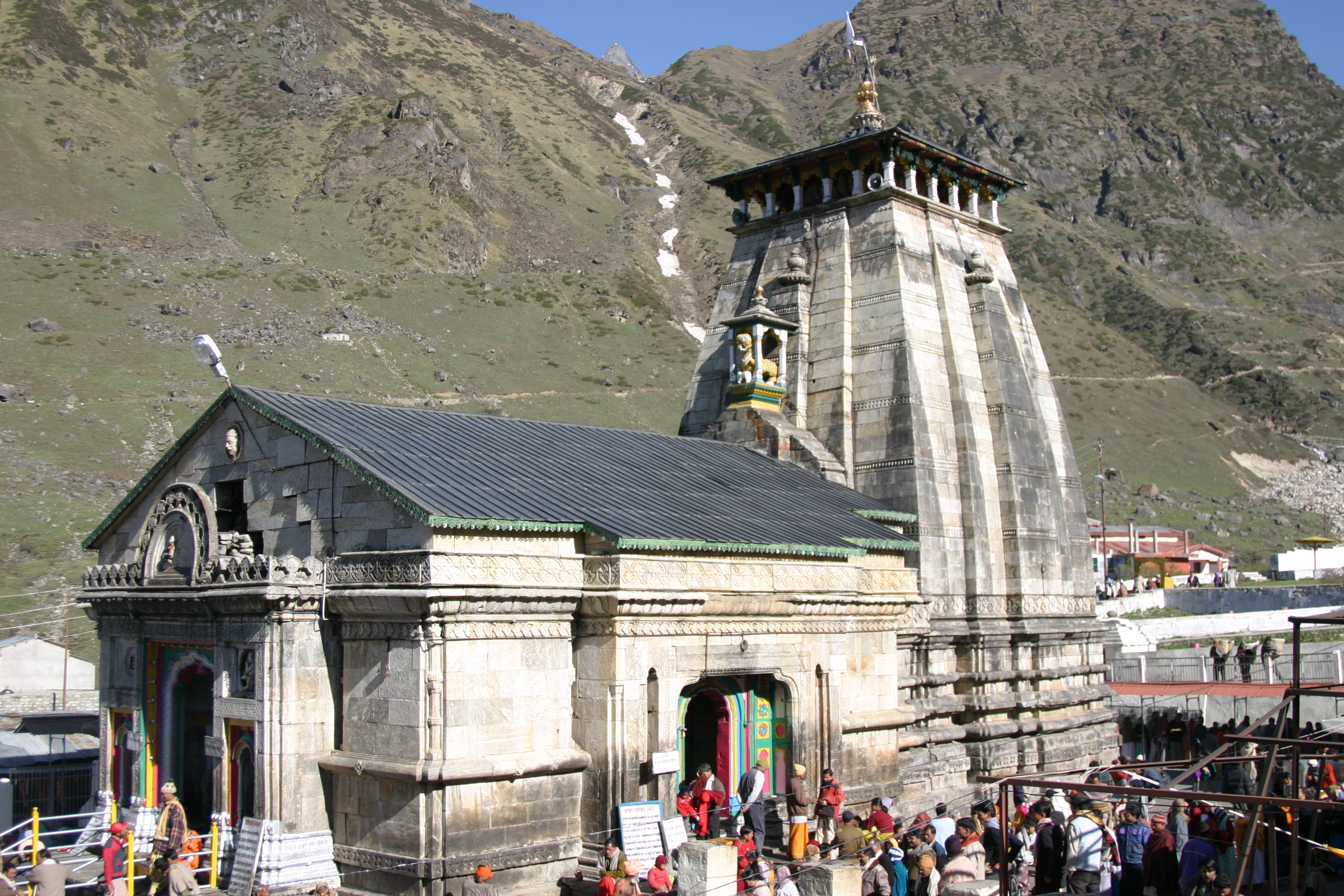
Kedarnath

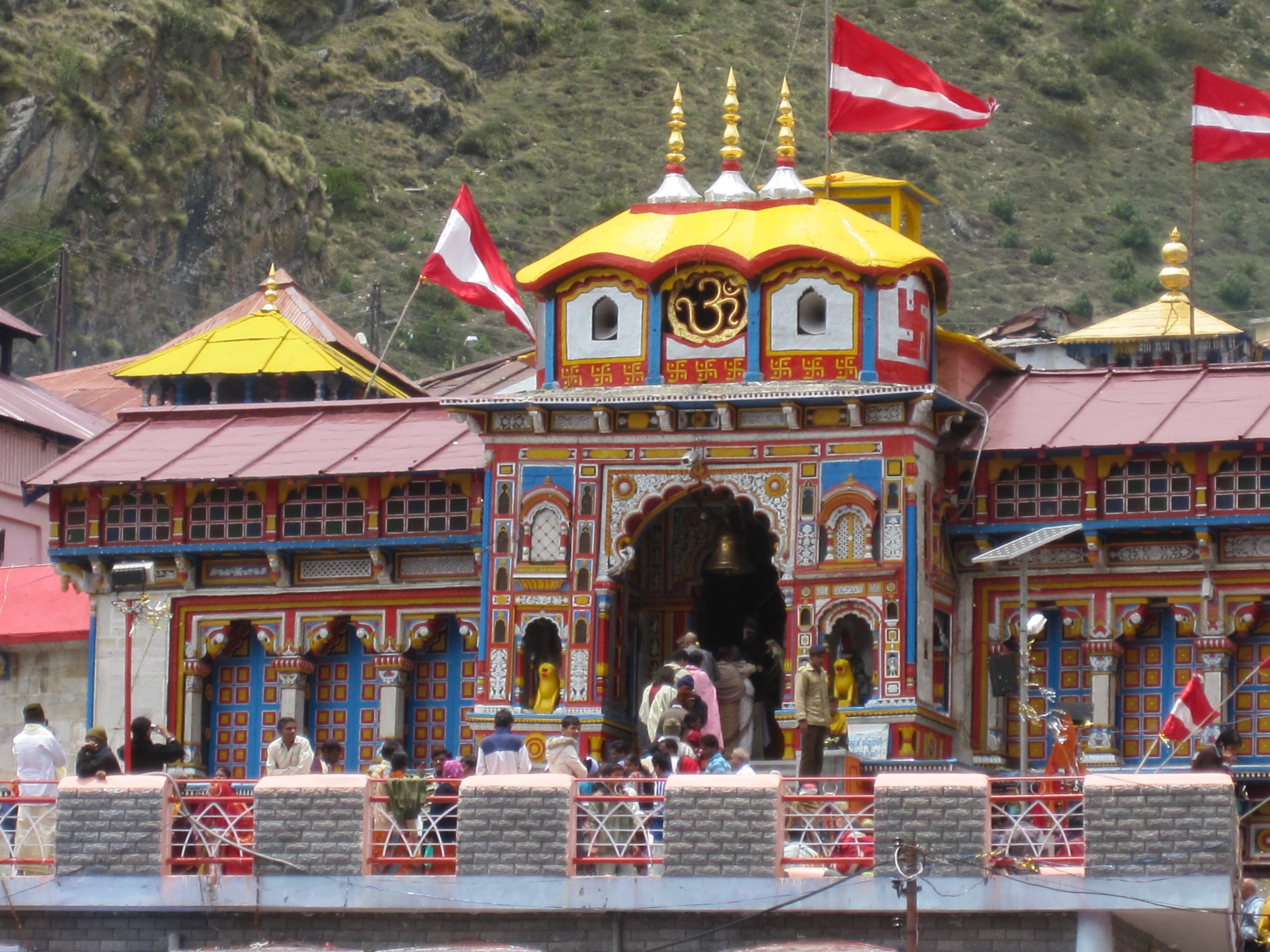
Badrinath

Gangotri is a town and a Nagar Panchayat (municipality) in Uttarkashi district in the state of Uttarakhand, India. It is 99 km from Uttarkashi, the main district headquarter. It is a Hindu pilgrim town on the banks of the river Bhagirathi – the origin of the river Ganges. The town is located in the Greater Himalayan Range, at a height of approximately 3,200 metres (10,500 ft). According to a popular Hindu legend, the goddess Ganga descended here when Shiva released the mighty river from the locks of his hair.

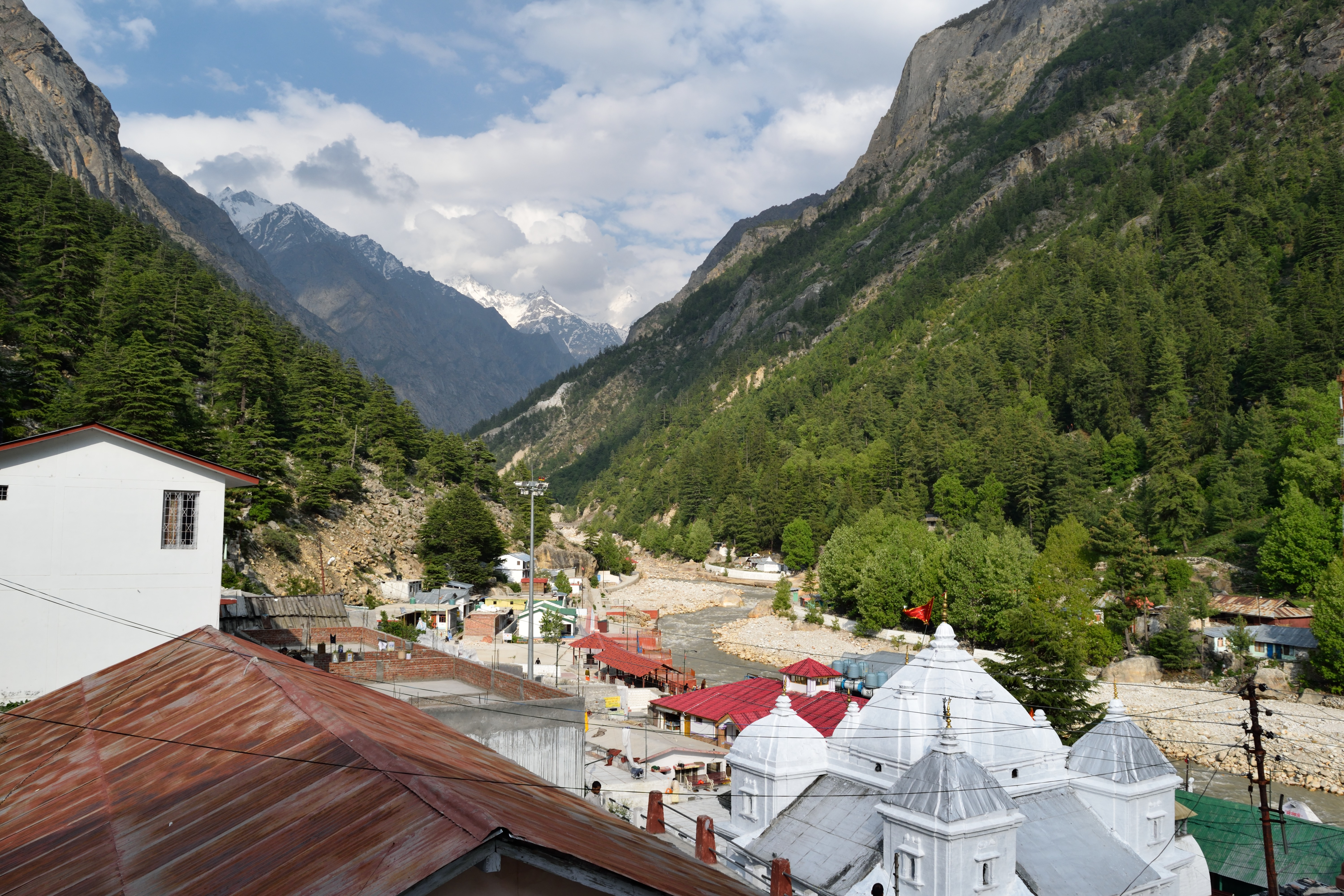
Bhagirathi River and Himalayas in Gangotri, Uttarakhand

== Significance ==
=== Ganga River ===
Gangotri is one of the four sites in the Chota Char Dham pilgrimage circuit. It is also the origin of the Ganges River and, per Hinduism, the seat of the goddess Ganga. The source of the Ganges River is the Bhagirathi River, originating from the Gangotri Glacier. Once the river confluences with the Alakananda River at a town called Devprayag it finally acquires the name Ganga.

Near the river is a stone where King Bhagiratha performed penance to Shiva in order to bring the Ganga down to earth and absolve the sins of his ancestors. According to another legend, Pandavas performed the great 'Deva Yajna' here to atone the deaths of their kinsmen in the epic battle of the Mahabharata. Hindus believe that performing the ancestral rites on the banks of Bhagirathi frees the spirit of the ancestor from the cycle of rebirth and a holy dip in its waters cleanses sins committed in the present also past births.

=== Gangotri Temple ===
The original Gangotri Temple was built by the Nepalese general Amar Singh Thapa and later restored in the 19th century. The temple is closed from Diwali day every year and is reopened on Akshaya Tritiya. During this time, the idol of the goddess is kept at Mukhba village, near Harsil. Ritual duties of the temple are supervised by the Semwal family of pujaris. These pujaris hail from Mukhba village.

== Demographics ==
According to the 2011 census of India, there are total 47 families residing in Gangotri. The total population of Gangotri is 110 out of which 97 are males and 13 are females. The literacy rate of Gangotri is 99.1%. The entire population of Gangotri identifies as Hindu.

== See also ==
- Gangotri National Park
- Harsil
- Yamuna
- Akshaya Tritiya
