= List of alpine lakes in India =

This is list of alpine lakes in India.

== Arunachal Pradesh ==
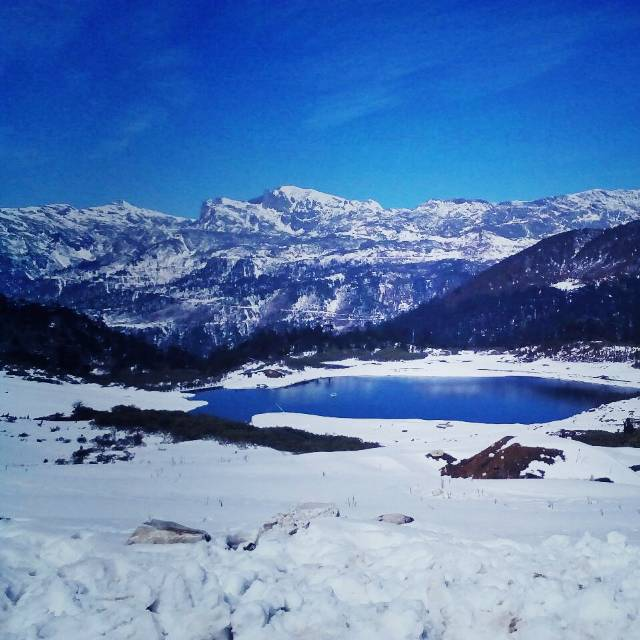
Sela lake, Arunachal Pradesh

- Sela Lake
- Sungester Lake
- Mehao Lake
- Pangateng Tso
- Nagula Lake

== Himachal Pradesh ==
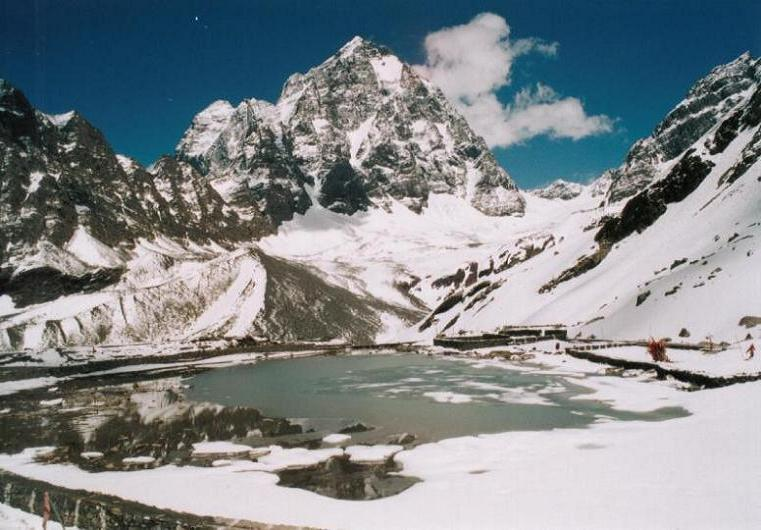
Kailash Manimahesh, Himachal Pradesh

- Dashaur Lake
- Bhrigu Lake
- NeelKanth Mahadev Lake
- Ghepan Ghat
- Dyna Sar
- Manimahesh Lake
- Seruvalsar and Manimahesh Lake
- Chakund lake
- Kamrunag Lake
- Dhankar Lake

== Jammu and Kashmir ==
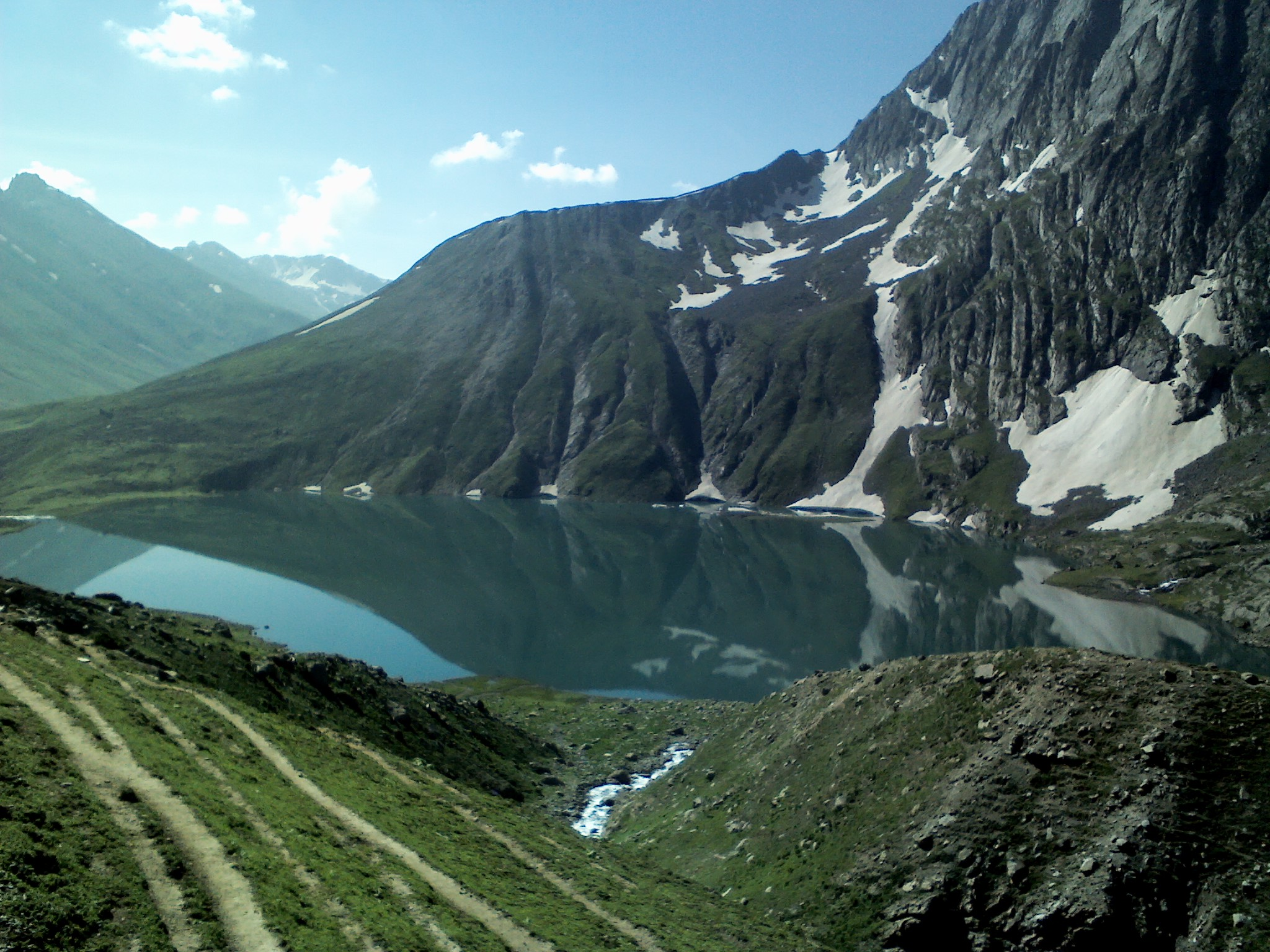
Vishansar Lake, Jammu and Kashmir

- Gadsar Lake
- Gangabal
- Tarsar Lake
- Tulian lake
- Vishansar Lake
- Satsar Lake
- Marsar Lake
- Krishansar Lake
- Nundkol Lake
- Sheshnag
- Shilsar lake
- Bilsar lake
- Choharnag lake
- Kounsarnag lake
- Katarnag lake
- Sonsar lake
- Damamsar lake
- Nehnaag lake
- Khilanag lake
- Nandansar lake
- Yamsar lake
- Khamsar lake
- Trusar lake
- Salnaisar lake
- Boadsar lake
- Koulsar lake
- Anderisar lake
- Chunsar lake
- Durinar Lake
- Sorus lake
- Salnai Lake
- Royalsar Lake
- Harbagwan Lake
- Dodsar lake
- Magrusar Lake
- SheerazSar Lake
- Sarbal Lake
- Chamarsar Lake
- Kundapani
- Kaantarnag Lake
- MunawarSar Lake
- Charinag Lake
- Arshansar Lake
- Sonsar Lake
- Harnag Lake
- Mawarnag Lake

== Ladakh ==
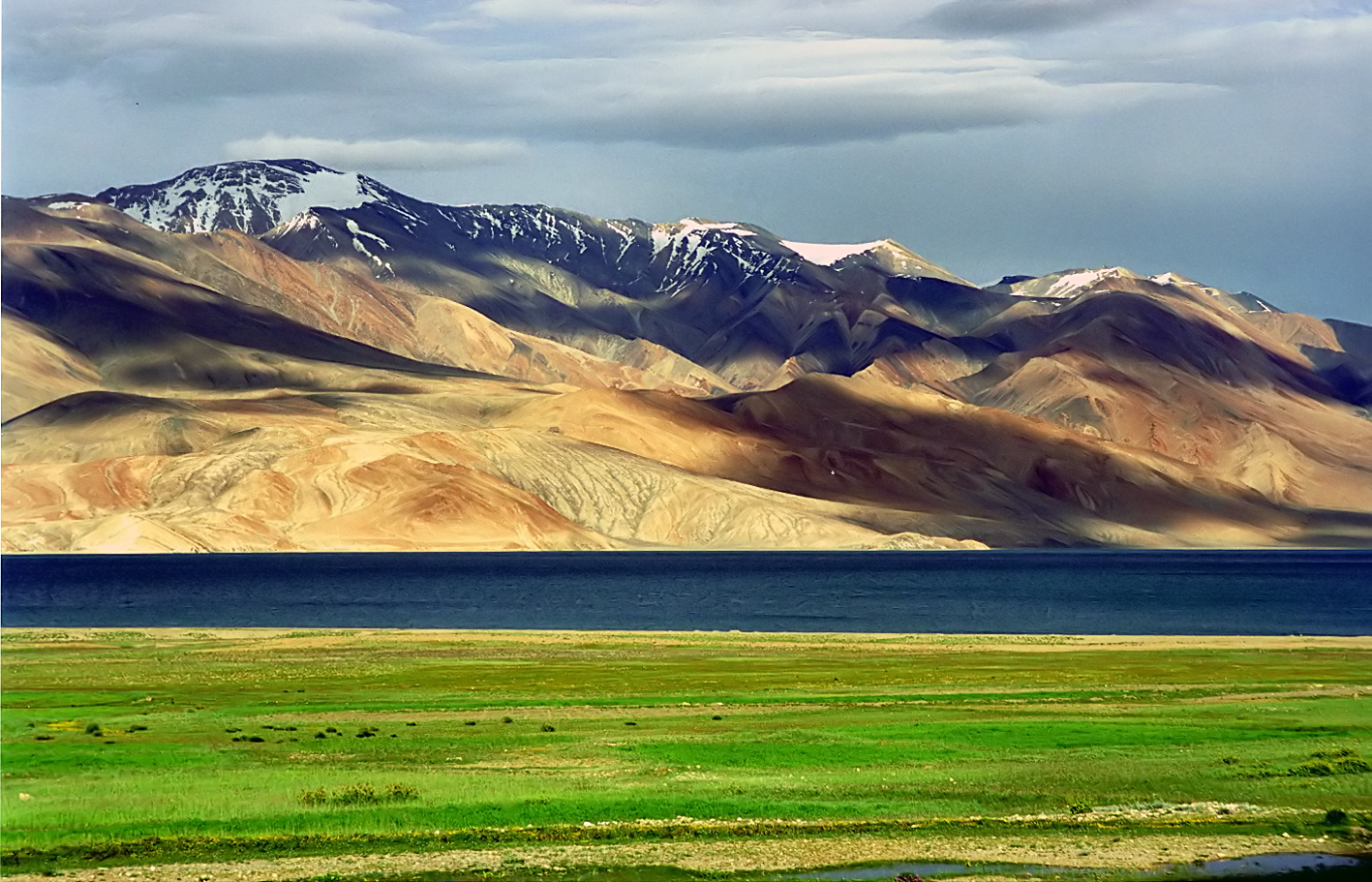
Tso Moriri, Ladakh

- Tso Moriri
- Pangong Tso
- Tso Kar
- Kyagar Tso
- Ryul Tso
- Chagar Tso
- Mirpal Tso
- Bangong Co
- Yaye Tso

== Sikkim ==
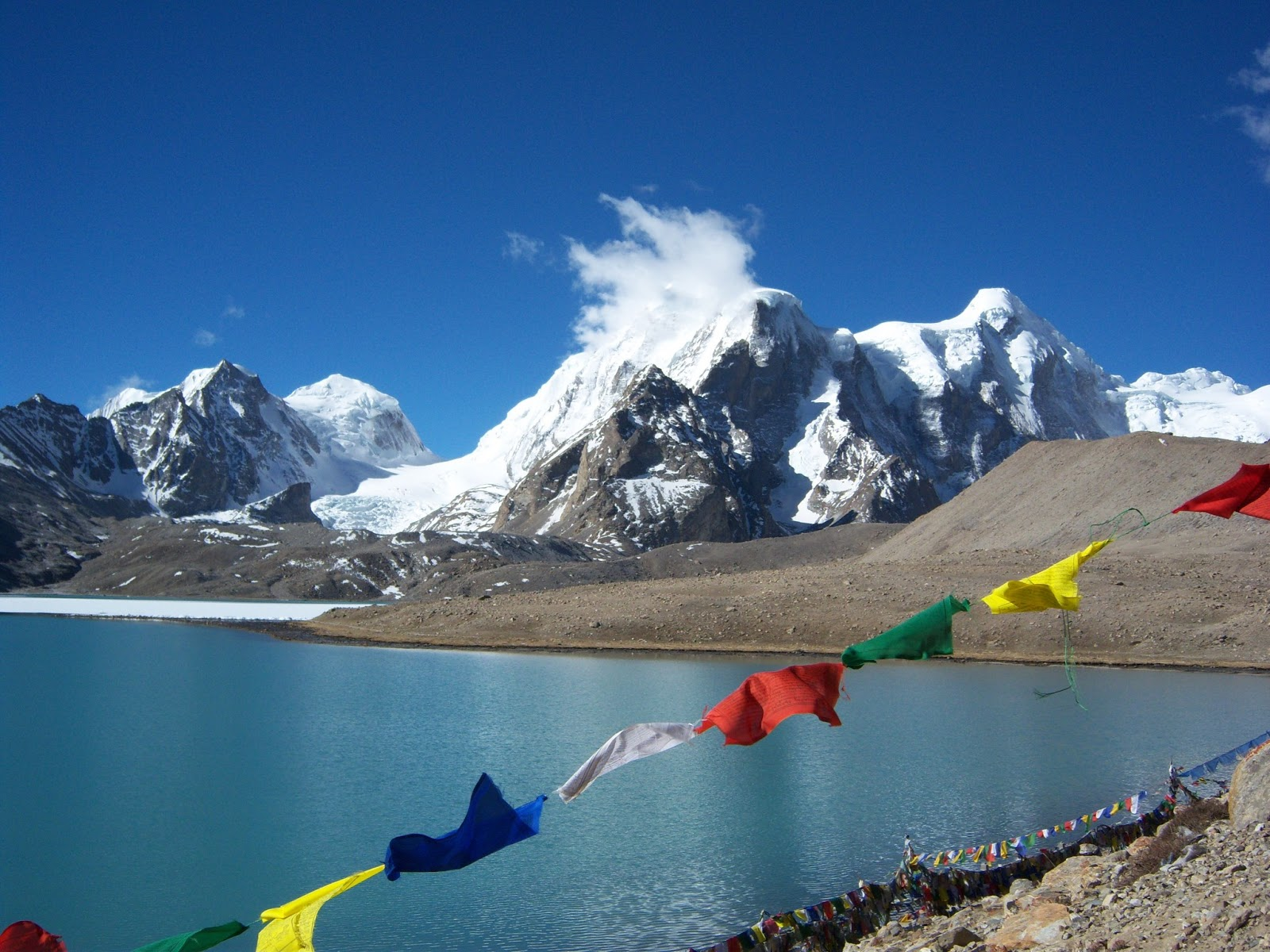
Gurudongmar Lake, Sikkim

- Tsomgo Lake
- Menmecho Lake
- Gurudongmar Lake
- Tso Lhamo Lake
- Lampokhri
- Sikkim jumley pokhri
- Lakshmi pokhri

== Uttarakhand ==
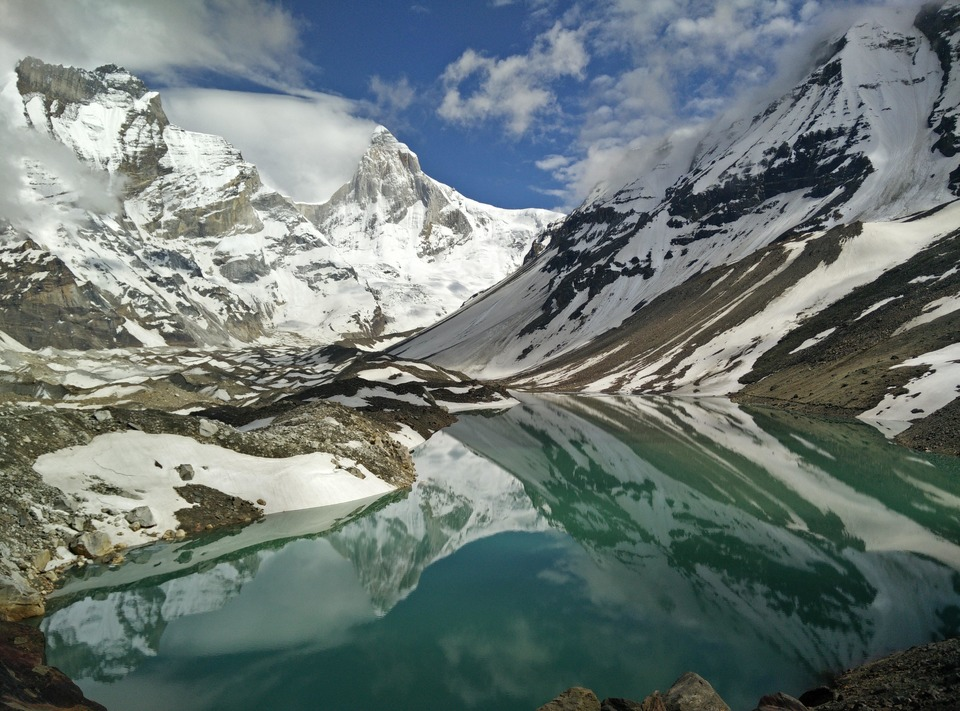
Kedartal, Uttarakhand

- Roopkund
- Kedartal
- Hemkund Lake
- Satopanth Tal
- Dodital
- Dodital
- Bedini Bugyal
- Bisurital
- Brahmatal
- Deo Taal
- Chorabari Lake
- Kagbhusandi Tal
- Kedartal

== See also ==
- Alpine lake
- Himalayas
