= Maneri Bhali Hydroelectric Project =

The Maneri Bhali Hydroelectric Project in Uttarakhand, India refers to one of its two stages:

- Maneri Dam – Stage I (1984), 90 MW
- Bhali Dam – Stage II (2008), 304 MW
