= Mammeri =

Mammeri is a surname. Notable people with the surname include:

- Azouaou Mammeri (1890 or 1892–1954), Algerian painter
- Koceila Mammeri (born 1999), Algerian badminton player
- Mouloud Mammeri (1917–1989), Algerian writer, anthropologist and linguist
- Tanina Mammeri (born 2003), Algerian badminton player

== See also ==
- Mameri
