= Manery =

Manery is a surname. Notable people with the surname include:

- Kris Manery (born 1954), Canadian ice hockey player
- Randy Manery (born 1949), Canadian ice hockey player and nonprofit leader

== See also ==
- Mantella manery, a species of frog
- Maneri
