= Maneri, India =

Maneri
- Location in Uttarakhand, India Maneri (India)
- Coordinates: 30°44′21″N 78°31′43″E
- Country: India
- State: Uttarakhand
- District: Uttarkashi

Population (2011)
  - Total: 1,270

Languages
  - Official: Hindi
- Time zone: UTC+5:30 (IST)
- Telephone code: 01374
- Vehicle registration: UK10
- Website: uk.gov.in

Maneri is a town in Uttarakhand, India. Situated on the banks of river Bhagirathi 8 km north of Uttarkashi, it is the home of Maneri Dam and the terminating railway station on Chota Char Dham Railway nearest to Gangotri.

== Geography ==
Maneri is located nearby Yamuna and Ganges (Bhagirathi) rivers, originating at Yamunotri and Gangotri (Gomukh) respectively.

== Demographics ==
As of 2001 India census, Maneri village has 299 families with a total population of 1271, of which 697 are males while 574 are females.

== Places of interest ==
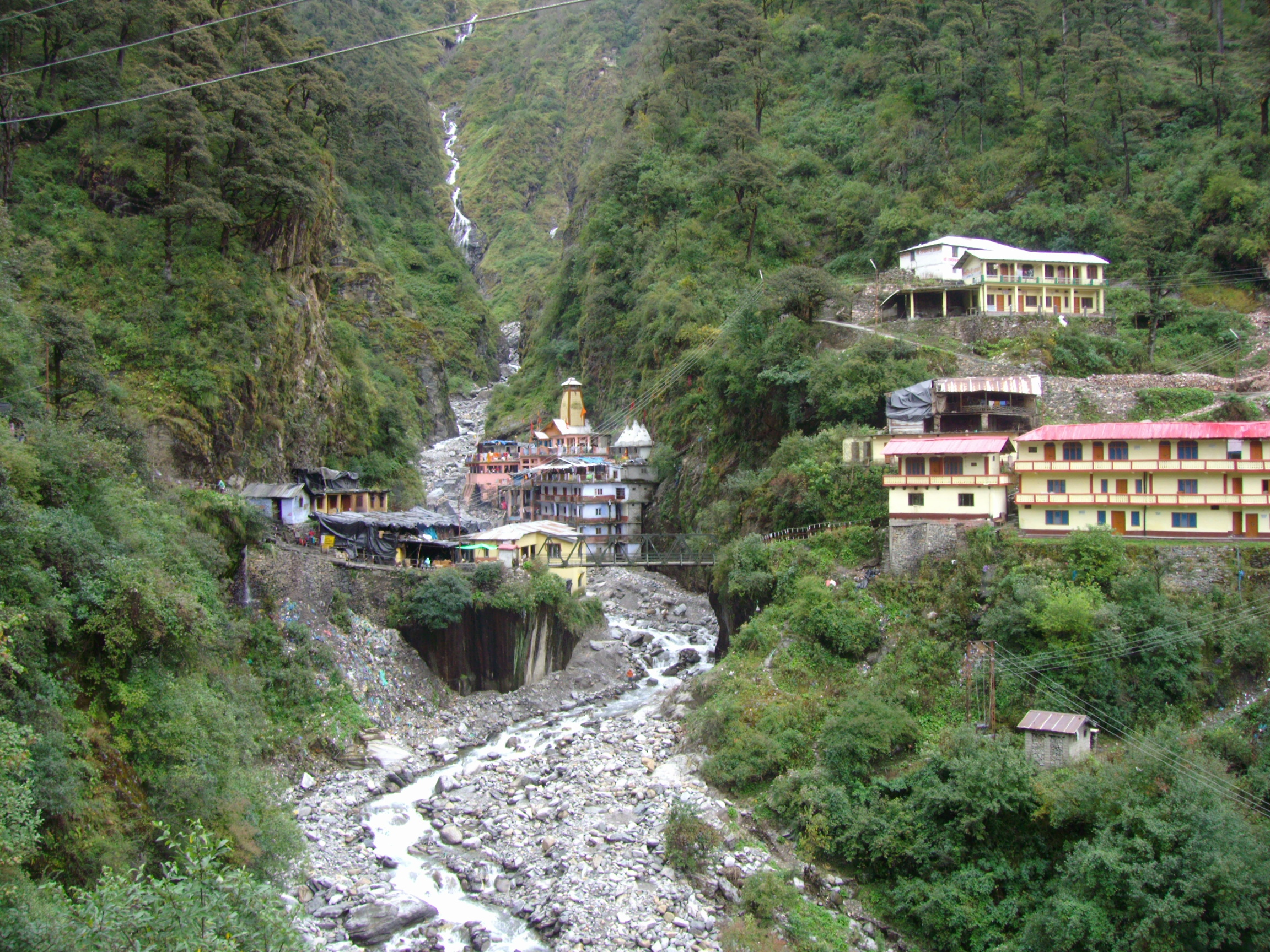
Yamunotri temple, one of holiest shrines of Hinduism lies in the district, as does its source

- Dodital: One of the popular fresh water lake in Uttarkashi. 21 km trek to Dodital starts from Sangamchatti.
- Tiloth Power Plant
- Maneri Dam
- Bhali Dam
- Nachiketa Tal
- Kuteti Devi temple
- Gyansu and Palla Gyansu
- Joshiyara
- Matli
- Mahidanda

=== Adventure sports ===
- White water rafting
- Trekking tracks
- Mountaineering

== See also ==
- 1991 Uttarkashi earthquake
