= Mameri =

Mameri is a surname. Notable people with the surname include:

- Abdelkrim Mameri (born 1981), Algerian footballer;
- Daniel Mameri (born 1972), Brazilian water polo player;
- Margaux Mameri (born 1997), French ice hockey player.

== See also ==
- Maneri
