= Maneri =

Maneri is a surname. Notable people with the surname include:

- Joe Maneri (1927–2009), American jazz musician and composer
- Mat Maneri (born 1969), American jazz musician and composer
- Sharafuddin Maneri (1263–1381), Indian Sufi mystic (Patna, Bihar).
- Steve Maneri (born 1988), American football player

== See also ==
- Maneri Dam, a dam in Uttarakhand, India
- Maneri, a habitation and railway station in Uttarakhand, India
