= Seruvalsar Lake =

- Seruvalsar and Manimahesh Lake
- Location within Himachal Pradesh Location within India
- Location: Kullu district, Himachal Pradesh, India
- Coordinates: 31°32′15″N 77°25′00″E
- Type: High altitude lake
- Surface elevation: 3,100 m (10,200 ft)

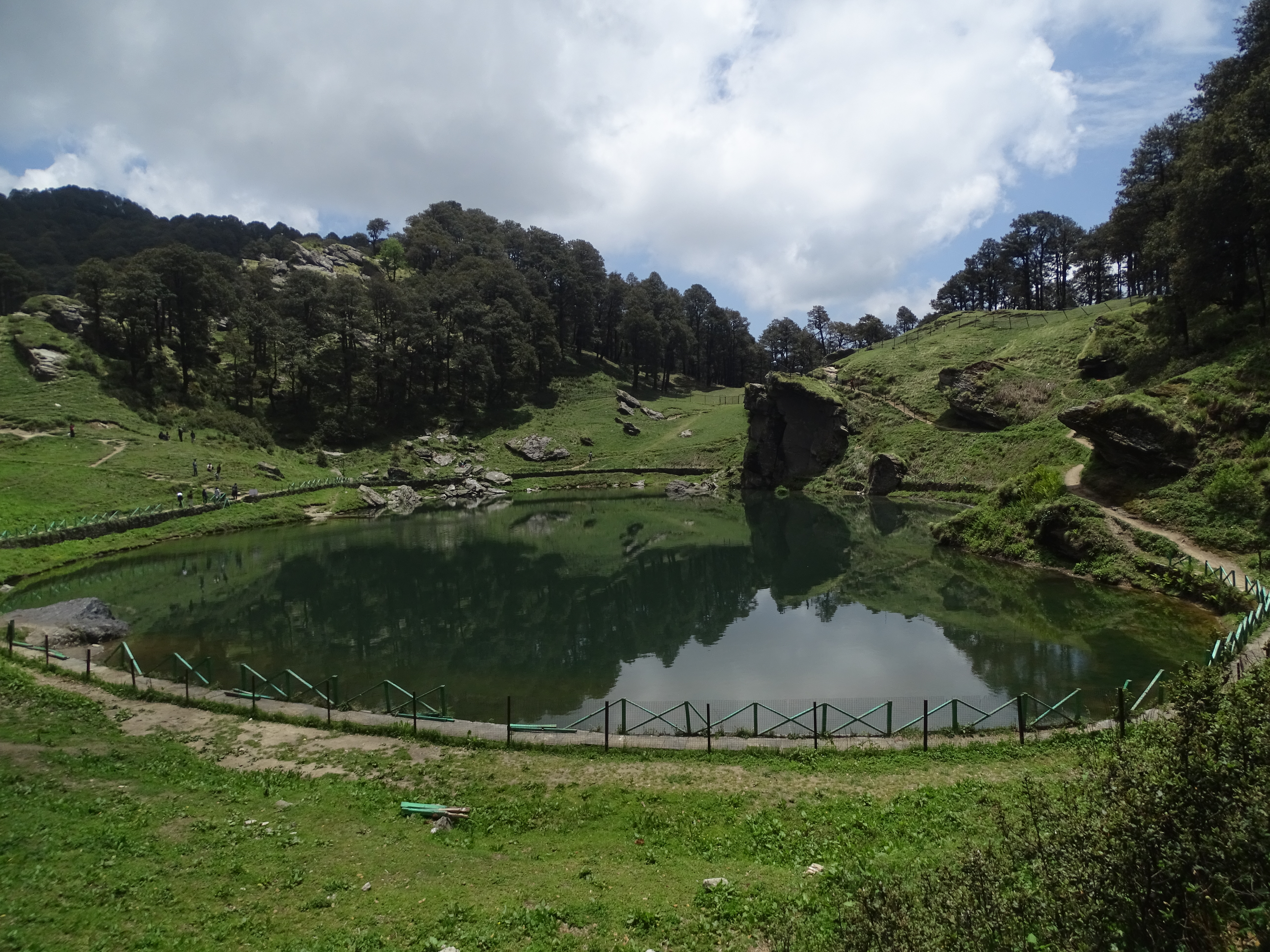
Seruvalsar Lake

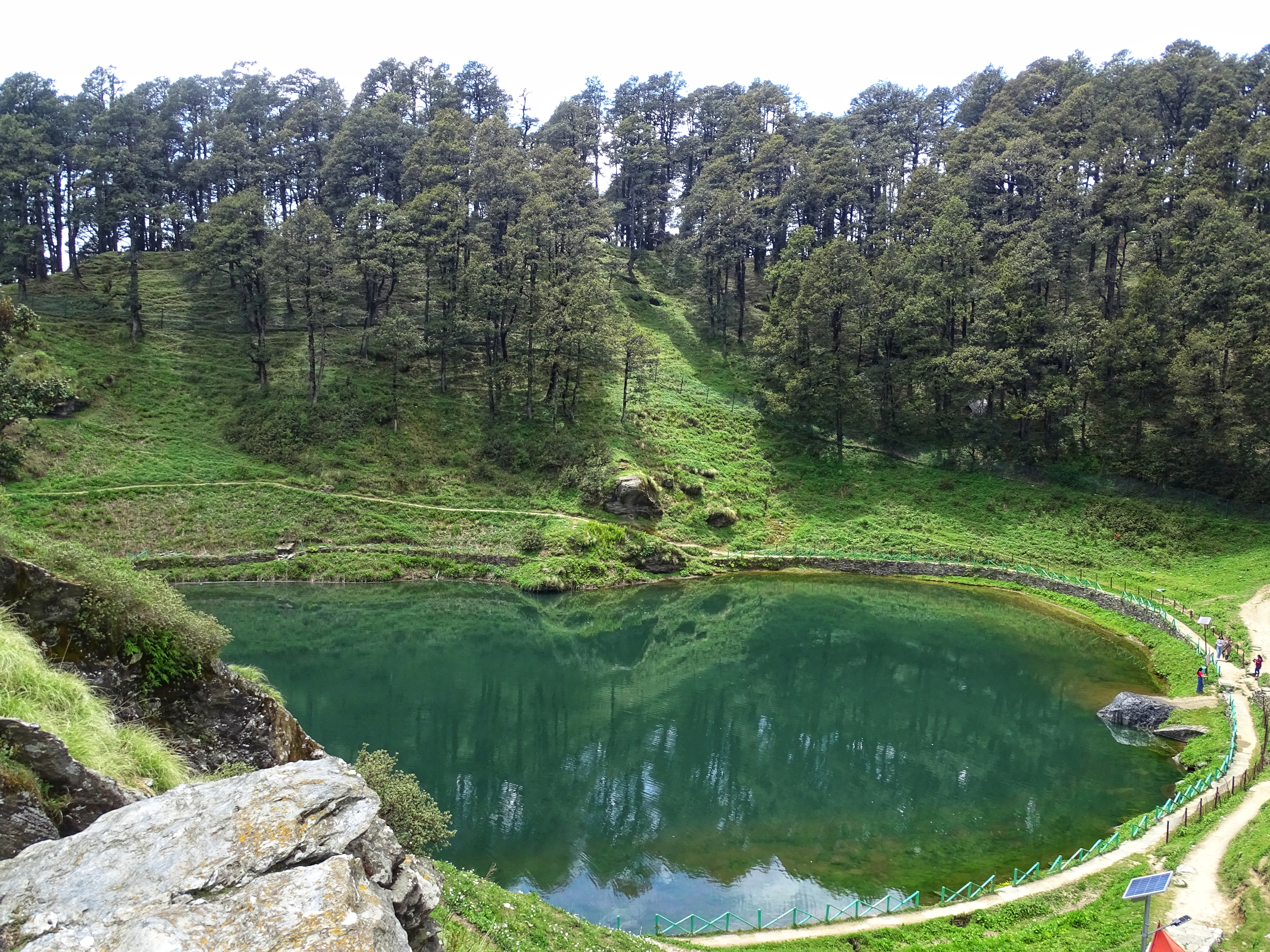
Seruvalsar Lake

Seruvalsar Lake (also spelled Sirolsar Lake or Serol Sar Lake, Hindi: सेरोल्सर लेक) is a high altitude lake in the Seraj Valley of the Kullu district, Himachal Pradesh, India. The lake is about 3,100 metres (10,171 ft) above the sea level and is surrounded by thick forest cover. Seruvalsar Lake is accessible via Jalori pass.

== History ==
Locals associate the lake with Buddhi Nagin (Hindi: बूढी नागिन, goddess of snakes and ghee and mother of all nag deities) and claim the lake's water possess medicinal properties. A small temple to Buddhi Nagin overlooks the lake from its North side.
