= Tulian Lake =

Lake in Jammu and Kashmir, India

- Tulyan
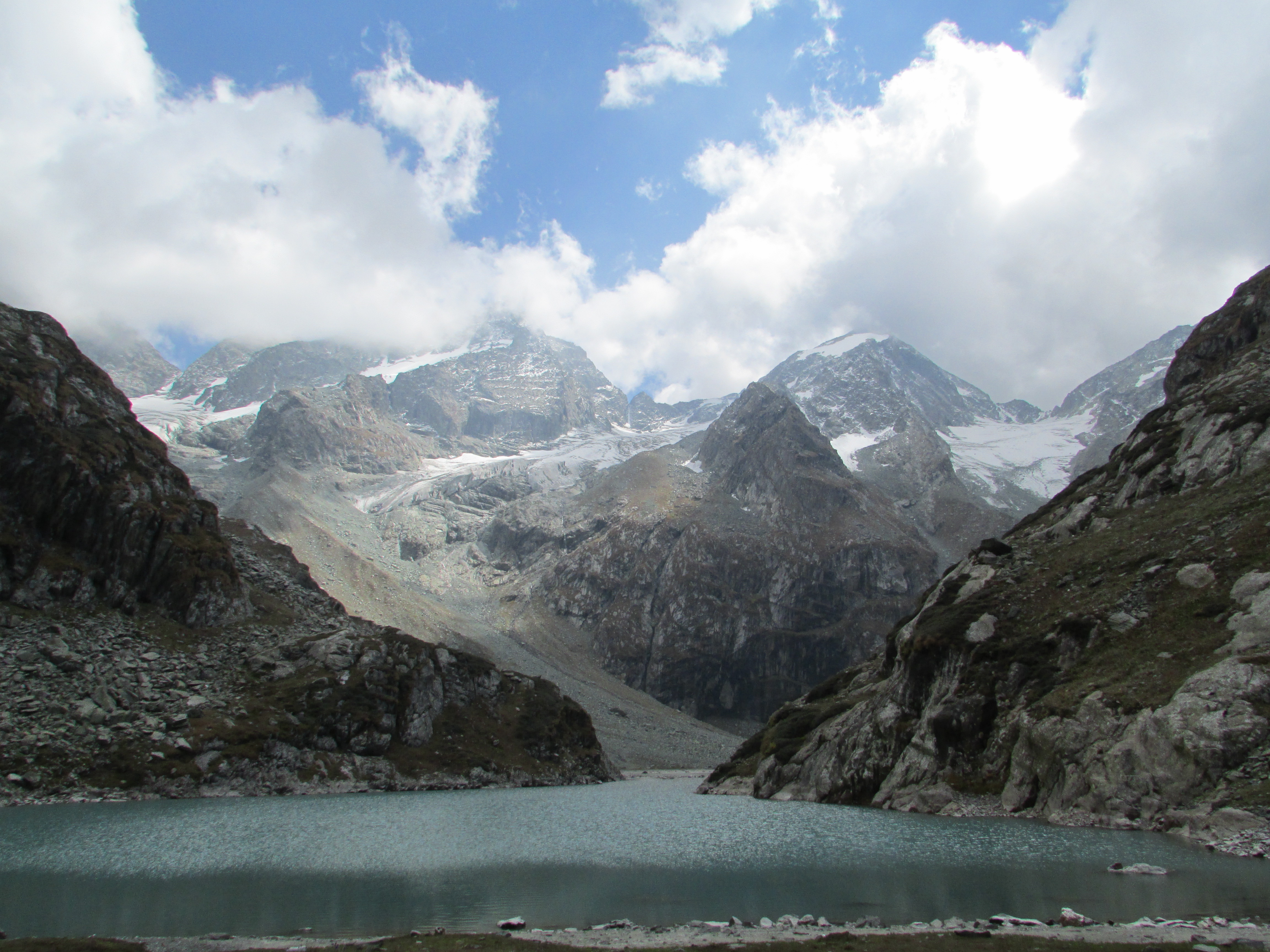

- Location within Jammu and Kashmir
- Location: Pahalgam, Kashmir Valley
- Coordinates: 33.99°N 75.39°E
- Type: Fresh water
- Basin countries: India
- Max. length: 0.35 kilometres (0.22 mi)
- Max. width: 0.16 kilometres (0.099 mi)
- Surface elevation: 3,684 metres (12,087 ft)
- Frozen: November to February
- Settlements: None

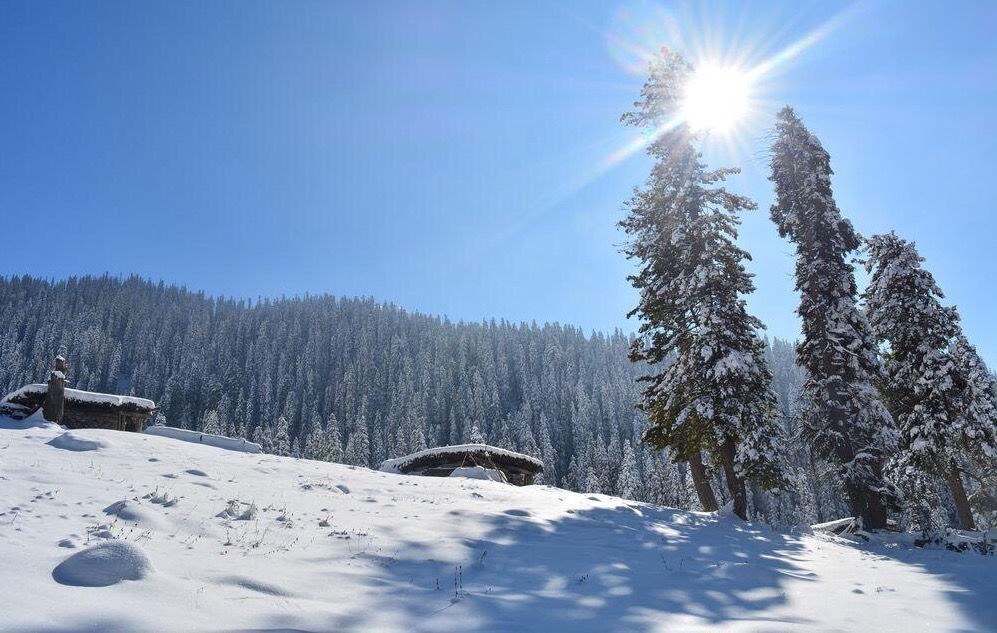
Way to the Tulian Lake

Tulian Lake or Tulian Sar is an alpine lake located, near Anantnag-Pahalgam in Anantnag district of Jammu and Kashmir, India. It lies at an altitude of 3,684 metres (12,087 ft) above sea level, 16 kilometres (9.9 mi) southwest from Pahalgam and 11 kilometres (6.8 mi) from Baisaran. The lake often has chunks of ice floating in it. It is surrounded on three sides by mountains that rise to over 4,800 metres (15,700 ft) and that are usually covered with snow. It is located in a meadow dotted with pine forests. The lake lies in the great Himalayan range.
