= Dharasu Power Station =

- Location of Dharasu Power Station in Uttarakhand Location of Dharasu Power Station in India
- Country: India
- Location: Dharasu, Uttarakhand
- Coordinates: 30°36′26″N 78°19′09″E
- Status: Operational
- Construction began: 1979
- Opening date: 2008
- Owner: Uttarakhand Jal Vidyut Nigam Limited

Dam and spillways
- Impounds: Bhagirathi River

Power Station
- Hydraulic head: 247.6 m (812 ft) (design)
- Turbines: 4 x 76 MW Francis-type
- Installed capacity: 304 MW

The Dharasu Power Station is a run-of-the-river hydroelectric power station on the Bhagirathi River located at Dharasu in Uttarkashi district, Uttarakhand, India. The power station was commissioned in 2008 and has a 304 MW capacity.

== Background ==
The power station is stage two of the Maneri Bhali Hydroelectric Project which was planned in the 1960s. In 1979, construction on stage two began. In 1984, the first stage, the 90 MW Tiloth Power Plant located upstream at Uttarkashi at 30°43′36″N 78°26′44″E was completed. Dharasu, the second stage was halted in 1990 due to funding issues and was not restarted until 2002. The power station was eventually completed and commissioned by 2008.

== Design ==
Water supplied to the power station is first diverted from the Bhagirathi River into a 16 km (10 mi) long tunnel by the 81 m (266 ft) long Bhali (Joshiyara) Dam located upstream near Bhali at 30°43′46″N 78°25′25″E. The difference in elevation between the barrage and the power station affords a design hydraulic head of 247.6 m (812 ft) and gross head of 285 m (935 ft). The water powers four 76 MW Francis turbine-generators before being discharged back into the river. The design discharge of the power station is 142 m^{3}/s (5,015 cu ft/s).

== See also ==
- List of power stations in India
