= Maneri Dam =

- Location within Uttarakhand Location within India
- Country: India
- Location: Uttarkashi
- Coordinates: 30°44′21″N 78°31′43″E
- Status: Operational
- Owner: Uttarakhand Jal Vidyut Nigam Limited

Dam and spillways
- Type of dam: Gravity
- Impounds: Bhagirathi River
- Height: 39 m (128 ft)
- Length: 127 m (417 ft)
- Dam volume: 13,700 m^{3} (17,919 cu yd)
- Spillway capacity: 5,000 m^{3}/s (176,573 cu ft/s)

Reservoir
- Total capacity: 600,000 m^{3} (486 acre⋅ft)
- Active capacity: 510,000 m^{3} (413 acre⋅ft)
- Surface area: 1.8 km^{2} (1 sq mi)

Tiloth Power Station
- Coordinates: 30°43′36″N 078°26′44″E
- Commission date: 1984
- Turbines: 3 x 30 MW (40,000 hp) Francis-type
- Installed capacity: 90 MW (120,000 hp)

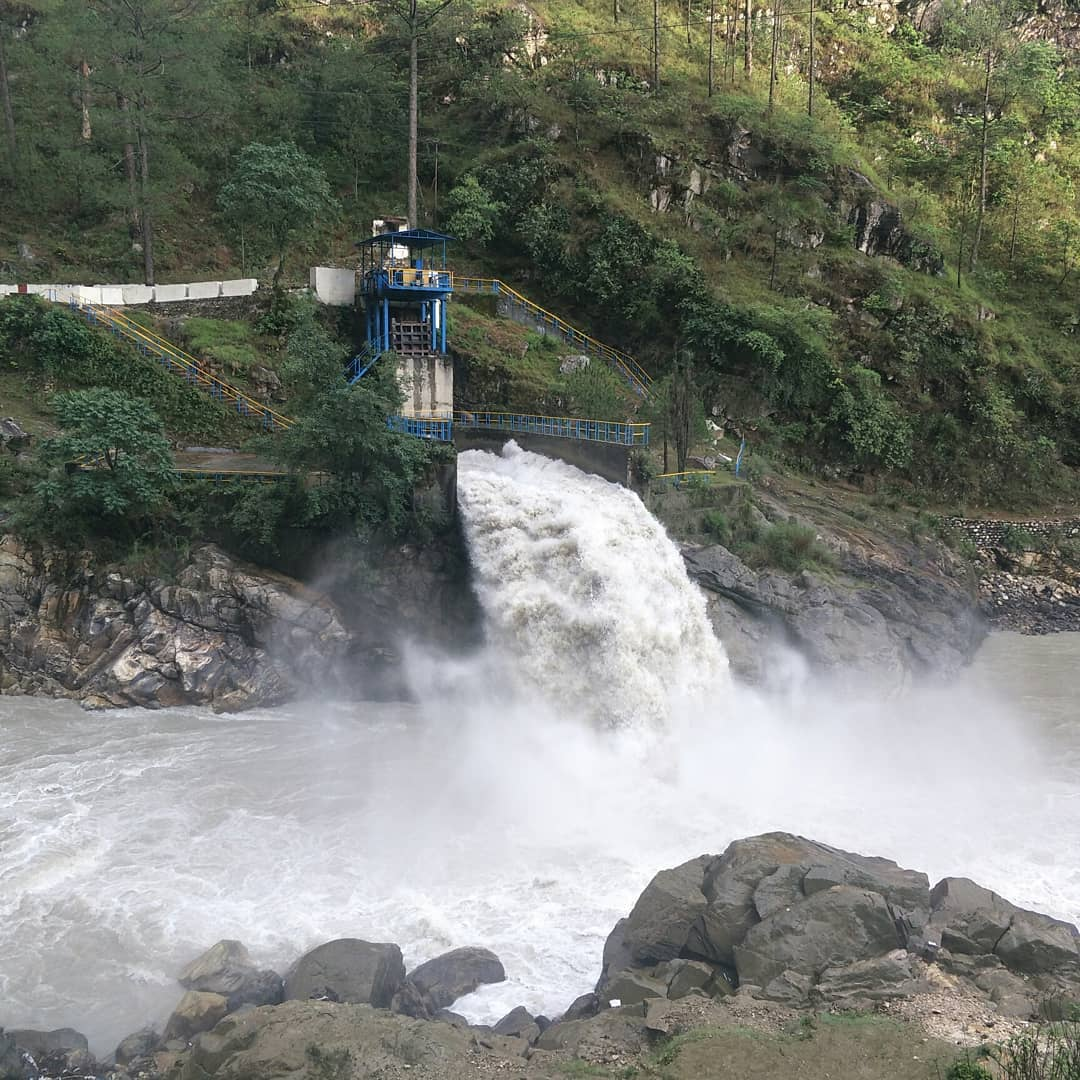
Maneri Dam Khedi Waterfall.

The Maneri Dam is a concrete gravity dam on the Bhagirathi River located at Maneri, 8.5 kilometres (5.3 mi) east of Uttarkashi in Uttarkashi district, Uttarakhand, India. The primary purpose of the dam is to divert water into a tunnel which feeds the 90-megawatt (120,000 hp) run-of-the-river Tiloth Power Plant.

== Background ==
The power station is stage one of the Maneri Bhali Hydroelectric Project which was planned in the 1960s. It was completed and commissioned in 1984. Dharasu Power Station, the second stage, was halted in 1990 due to funding issues and was not restarted until 2002. It was eventually completed and commissioned by 2008.

== Design and operation ==
The Maneri Dam is a 39 m (128 ft) tall and 127 m (417 ft) wide gravity dam with a structural volume of 13,700 m^{3} (17,919 cu yd). It's spillway is located on its crest and is controlled by four tainter gates. In addition to discharge tunnel, the spillway has a maximum discharge capacity of 5,000 m^{3}/s (176,573 cu ft/s). The dam's reservoir has a 600,000 m^{3} (486 acre⋅ft) capacity, of which 510,000 m^{3} (413 acre⋅ft) is active (or "useful") capacity. Water supplied to the power station is first diverted from the Bhagirathi River by the dam into a 8.6 km (5.3 mi) long tunnel directly behind the dam. The difference in elevation between the barrage and the power station affords a design hydraulic head of 147.5 m (484 ft) and gross head of 180 m (590 ft). Near the Tiloth Power Plant, the tunnel splits into three penstocks to power each of the three 30 MW Francis turbine-generators before being discharged back into the river. The design discharge of the power station is 71.4 m^{3}/s (2,521 cu ft/s).

== See also ==
- List of power stations in India
