= Dodital =

Lake in India

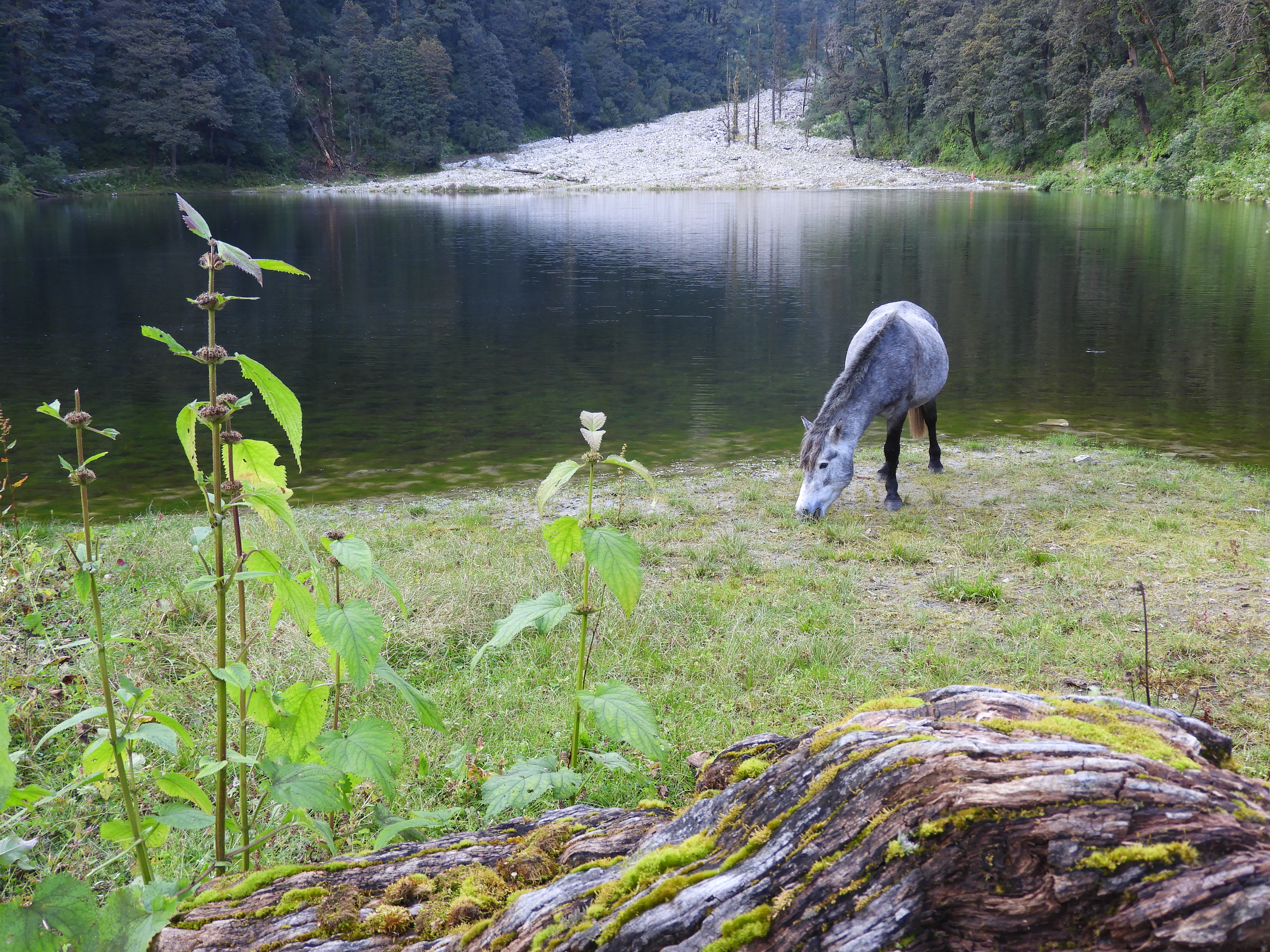
- Dodital lake

- Location within Uttarakhand
- Interactive map of Dodital
- Location: Uttarakhand, India
- Coordinates: 30°53′52″N 78°31′31″E
- Basin countries: India

Dodital is a freshwater lake in uttarkashi district, Uttarakhand, India, situated at a height of 3,657 metres (11,998 ft). The Assi Ganga river emerges from Dodital and joins Bhagirathi at the confluence in Gangori, near Uttarkashi. The lake is named after sage Dodi who had mediated there. The lake is home to freshwater trout.
