= Mana, Chamoli =

Village in Chamoli of Uttrakhand

Mana
- Village
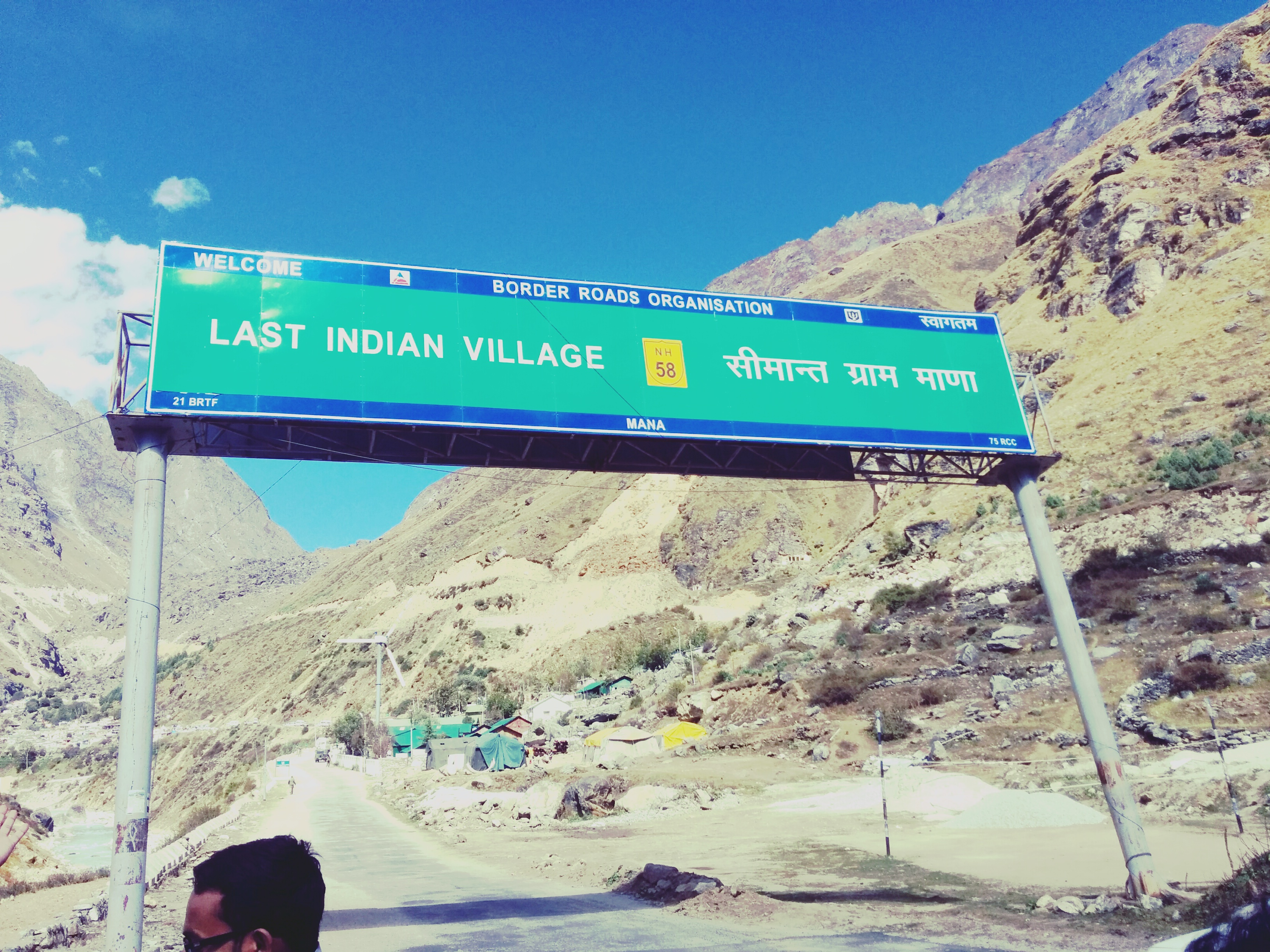
- Gateway to Mana village

- Location in Uttarakhand, India Mana (India)
- Coordinates: 30°46′19″N 79°29′43″E
- Country: India
- State: Uttarakhand
- District: Chamoli
- Elevation: 3,200 m (10,500 ft)

Population (2011)
  - Total: 1,214

Languages
  - Official: Hindi
  - Native: Rongpo (Marcha)
- Time zone: UTC+5:30 (IST)
- Vehicle registration: UK 11

Mana is a village in the district of Chamoli in the Indian state of Uttarakhand, located at an altitude of 3,200 meters (10,500 feet). The geographic location of Mana village is at approximately 30°46′21.4″N latitude and 79°29′43.2″E longitude. It is located on the northern terminus of National Highway 7. Mana is the first village before the Mana Pass and is 26 kilometres from the border of India and Tibet. Formerly known as "India's Last Village" due to its proximity to the Indo-Tibetan border and is now known as the "First Indian Village". The village is at a distance of about 3 km from the Hindu Pilgrimage Badrinath and the two places are culturally connected with each other.

== Demography ==
As per Census 2011 the village had about 558 households and a population of about 1214. The people belong to the Marchha, Jad or Bhotia clans. During winter months, the entire populations comes down to lower places, as the area is covered under snow.

== Places to see near Mana ==
Mana village offers several important tourist and religious attractions in its vicinity:

=== Neelkanth ===
Neelkanth Peak is at a height of around 6,597m above sea level and is known as the 'Queen of Garhwal'. The holy place of Badrinath can be seen from this peak.

=== Tapt Kund ===
Tapt Kund, a natural spring, is believed to be the abode place of Lord Agni. It is believed that the Kund has medicinal values and can cure many skin diseases.

=== Mata Murti Temple ===
This temple is devoted to the mother of Lord Narayan. According to legends, Mata Murti requested Lord Vishnu to take birth as her son. Lord Vishnu granted her this wish by taking birth in the form of a twin, Nar and Narayan. The temple holds an annual fair in the month of August.

Vasudhara It is a waterfall, which is located 9kms away from Badrinath temple. It is believed that this place is a temporary stay point of Pandavas, during their exile. The view of Vasudhara river valley give panoramic views.

Vyas Gufa It is believed that Ved Vyas lived here while composing the four Vedas. A distinct feature of the temple is the roof which resembles the pages from Ved Vyas collection of his Holy Books. There is small shrine in the cave which is dedicated to him, which is 5000 years old.

Bheem Pul Bheem Pul is believed to have been created by Bheem (one of the five brothers among the Pandavas) near River Saraswati. It's a huge rock formed as a bridge across river Saraswati. Legend says that Bheem placed the rock to make way for Draupadi to cross the river during journey to heaven.

== Other landmarks ==
Nearby places include Vasudhara Falls, Satopanth Lake, Bhim Pul, and Saraswati Temple.

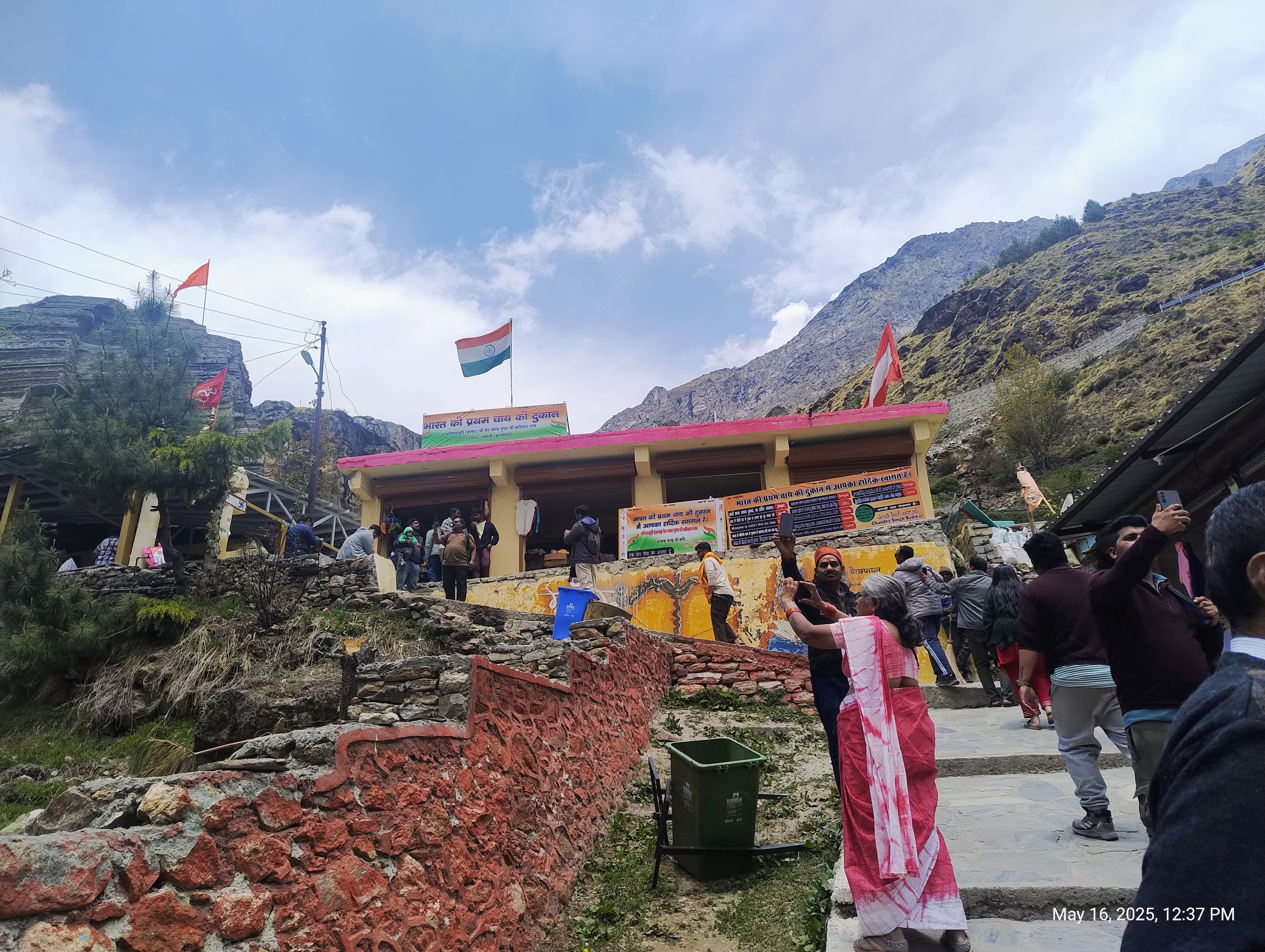
Mana Village has India's first tea shop

== See also ==
- Mana Pass
- Niti Valley
