= Satopanth Tal =

Lake in Uttarakhand, India

- Location within Uttarakhand Location within India
- Interactive map of Satopanth Tal
- Location: Uttarakhand, India
- Coordinates: 30°44′37″N 79°21′25″E
- Basin countries: India

Satopanth Trail
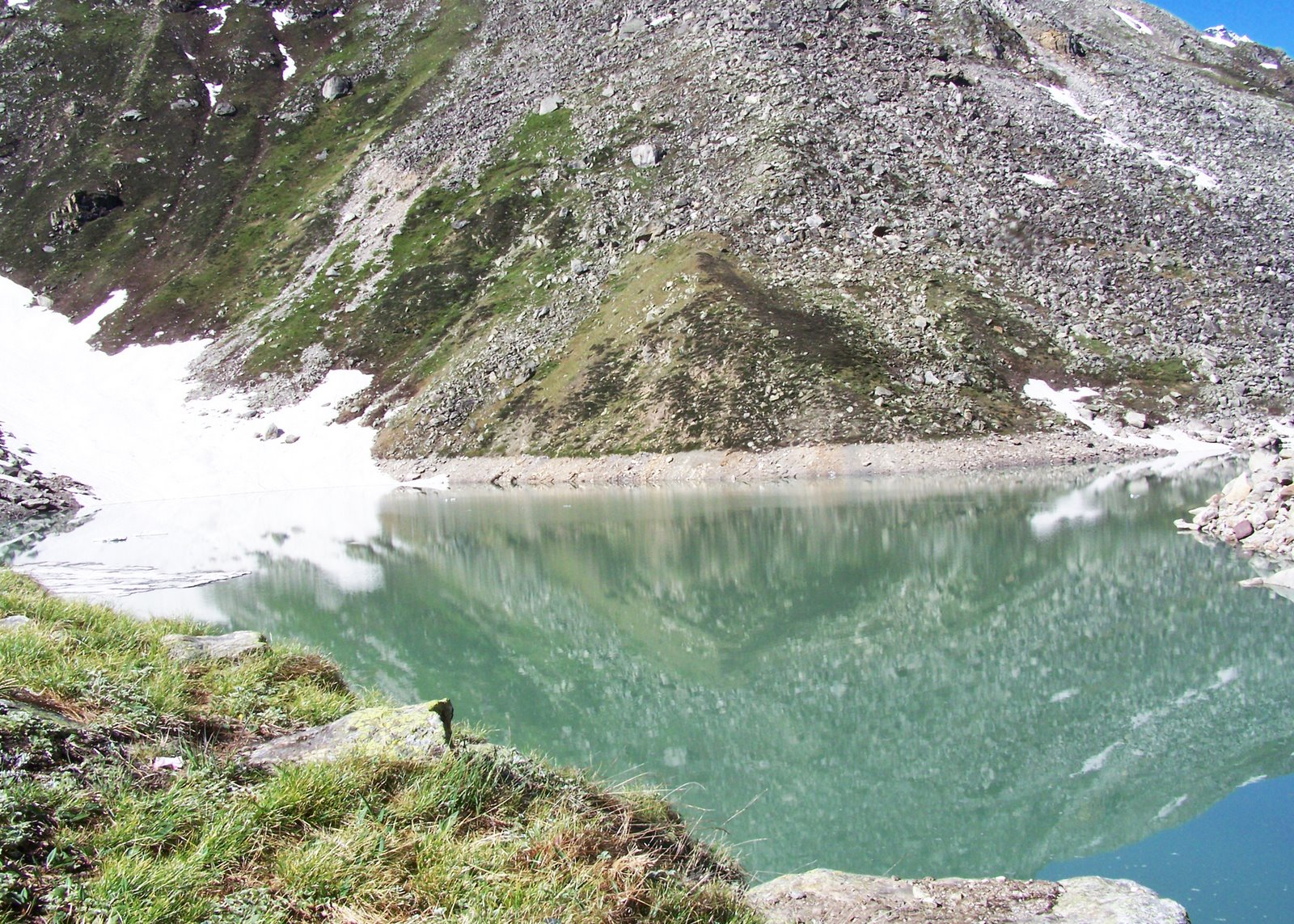
- Satopanth Tal
- Location: Uttarakhand, India
- Trailheads: Badrinath to Satopanth Tal
- Use: Hiking
- Highest point: Satopanth Top
- Lowest point: Badrinath
- Difficulty: Three star trek
- Season: July to September
- Sights: Mt. Nilkantha, Mt. Balakun, Satopanth Glacier, Bhagirath Kharak Glacier, Alakapuri

Satopanth Tal is a lake in Uttarakhand, India, located in the midst of snow-capped peaks at an altitude of 4,600 metres (15,100 ft) above sea-level. It lies near the base of the Satopanth Glacier. The lake is considered to be of religious and environmental significance to the local people.

== Geography ==
Satopanth tal is triangular in shape with a diameter of approximately 450 metres and a perimeter of roughly 1,097 metres. It is located in the midst of snow-capped peaks at an altitude of 4,600 metres from sea level and is 25 km from Badrinath. The lake is primarily fed by melting snow from the Satopanth and Bhagiratha Kharak Glaciers. Water from the lake flows into the Alaknanda River, which is a major headstream of the Ganges.

The lake remains frozen from the end of September to the middle of May or early June. According to studies, the neighbouring Satopanth glacier has retreated about 2.3 km between 1962 and 2013.

== Etymology and Religious Significance ==
The name Satopanth comes from the Sanskrit words satya (meaning truth) and path (meaning road or path), together implying the “path of truth”.

The three corners of the lake are named Brahmaghat, Vishnughat and Maheshwarghat in honor of Brahma, Vishnu and Shiva. The lake holds significant spiritual importance for the local community of the nearby Mana village, who immerse the ashes of their deceased relatives in the lake. By doing so, they believe the sacred site will help the soul of the deceased to achieve moksha (spiritual liberation).

== Access and Trekking route ==
Satopanth Tal is approximately 25 km (15.5 mi) northwest of Badrinath and densely covered by snow. There are no proper roads to the lake. The primary access route start near Badrinath and follows the course of the Alaknanda River valley. The route passes through Vasudhara Falls - a high waterfall and pilgrimage - and the meadow of Chakratirtha by the base of the Satopanth Glacier. From here, the last part of the trek involves active boulder fields and glacial scree at a high altitude. Due to severe winter weather and heavy snow accumulation, the lake is only accessible from June to September.
