= Zsolt Erőss =

Hungarian mountaineer (1968–2013)

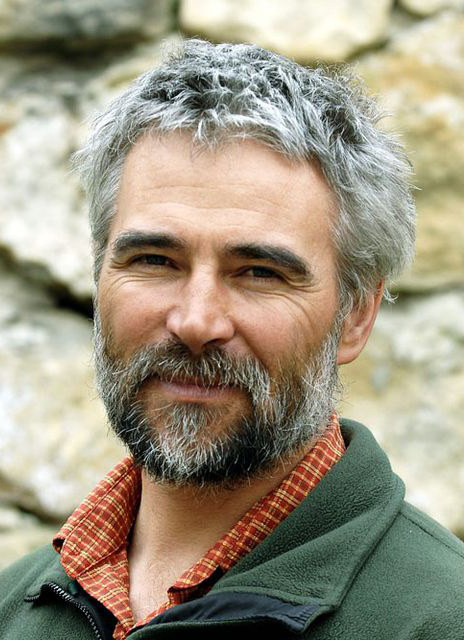
- Erőss in 2010
- Born: March 7, 1968; Miercurea Ciuc, Romania
- Disappeared: May 21, 2013 (aged 45); Kangchenjunga
- Status: Body found in 2014
- Other name: Hópárduc (Snow leopard)
- Citizenship: Romanian, Hungarian
- Occupation: Mountaineering
- Known for: First Hungarian to summit Mount Everest, summits of 10 of 14 eight-thousanders
- Spouse: Hilda Sterczer
- Children: Gerda Erőss (b. 2009), Csoma Erőss (b. 2011)
- Website: Zsolt Erőss Mountaineering

Zsolt Erőss (March 7, 1968 – May 21, 2013) was the most successful Hungarian high-altitude mountaineer, summiting 10 of the 14 eight-thousanders. He was also the first Hungarian citizen to have climbed Mount Everest.

In 2010, he lost his right leg in an avalanche accident, requiring amputation below the knee. Soon after his recovery he returned to mountaineering, trying to summit the Cho Oyu in fall 2010. The expedition did not reach the top due to bad weather conditions, but later in May 2011 he successfully summited Lhotse. After successfully scaling Kangchenjunga on May 20, 2013, he went missing in descent. Search missions were suspended on May 22. According to the expedition's leader and other experienced mountaineers, his survival is impossible.

== Life ==
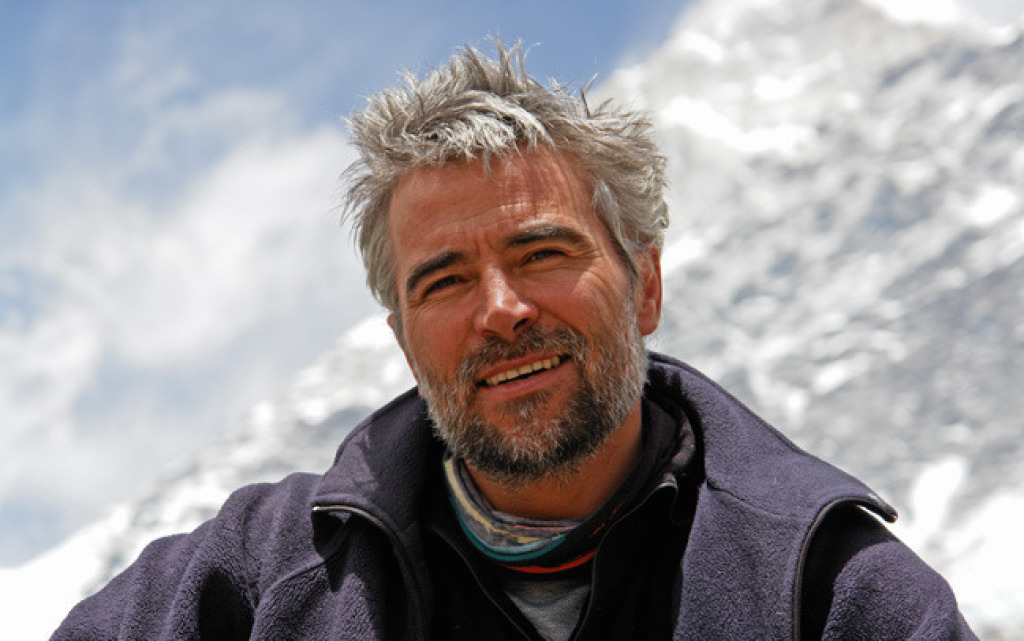
Zsolt Erőss in the mountains

He was an ethnic Székely, born in Miercurea Ciuc (Csíkszereda), a town in Transylvania, Romania. He started mountain climbing in the Bicaz Gorge in 1981, after he climbed several Transylvanian mountains. He moved to Hungary in 1988 with his mother and brother, and became a Hungarian citizen in 1992. He lived in Pilisvörösvár for several years. From 1989 he worked as an industrial alpinist. His first climb as the member of an expedition was in 1990 at the Elbrus. Afterward he climbed Pamir, Aconcagua and Kilimanjaro among others listed below. He was the member of the first and second Hungarian Mount Everest Expedition in 1996 and 2001, respectively, but couldn't reach the peak.

In 2002, he succeeded in climbing the Mount Everest as the first Hungarian citizen and second Hungarian overall (the first was Czechoslovak citizen Zoltán Demján in 1984). He was awarded the Order of Merit of the Hungarian Republic with the Officers' Cross. In early 2010 he suffered an accident in the Tatra mountains, which led to his right leg being amputated below the knee. He returned to climbing the same year using a prosthetic leg. Until his disappearance he climbed ten of the world's eight-thousanders, the last two with prosthetic leg.

He met his wife Hilda Sterczer on an internet dating site in 2006. Their first date was a climb up the Glockner, the highest peak in Austria.

== Disappearance ==
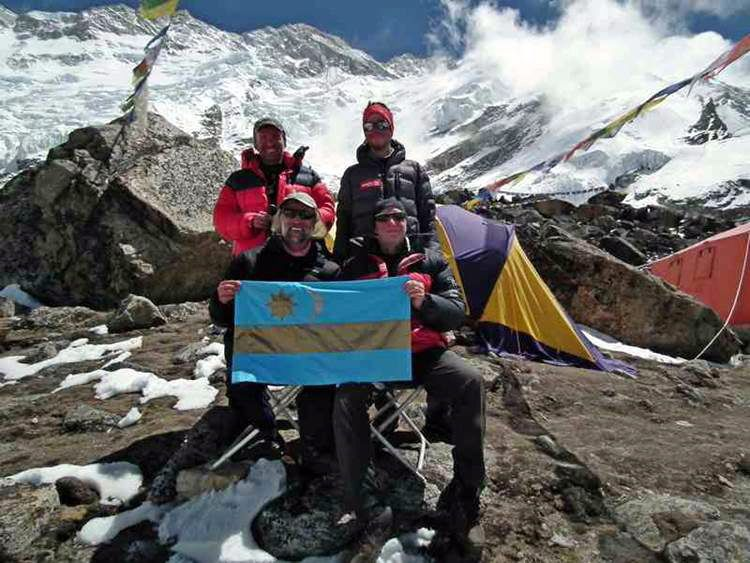
Zsolt Erőss, Peter Kiss are showing the Szekely flag in the Kangchenjunga, in the third highest mountain in the world

On May 20, 2013, 18:00 he successfully summited Kangchenjunga together with his climbing partner, 26-year-old Péter Kiss. During the descent Erőss reported feeling weak and showed signs of exhaustion, falling behind the rest of the summiteers. He spent the night presumably alone in the death zone, but in the morning he was joined by Kiss, who in a highly unusual move climbed back up to help his partner, as reported around 9 am. They were seen descending slowly towards Camp 4, situated at 7600 m, but soon after Kiss fell and disappeared. Erőss' condition deteriorated rapidly, reporting vision problems, being unaware of Kiss' whereabouts and finally speaking incoherently. He sat down and slept a few hours, after which around 3:00 pm he reported feeling better and seemed to get back his strength to start moving down to Camp 4. Along the way he went missing, and was never seen again. Members of a Korean expedition, who also lost one of their members, attempted to search for both Erőss and Kiss but only Kiss' body could be spotted.

On May 22, it was announced that the search for the climbers had been abandoned. However, his body was seen in 2014 on the ramp at 8100 m and its identity was confirmed.

== Climbed Eight-thousanders ==
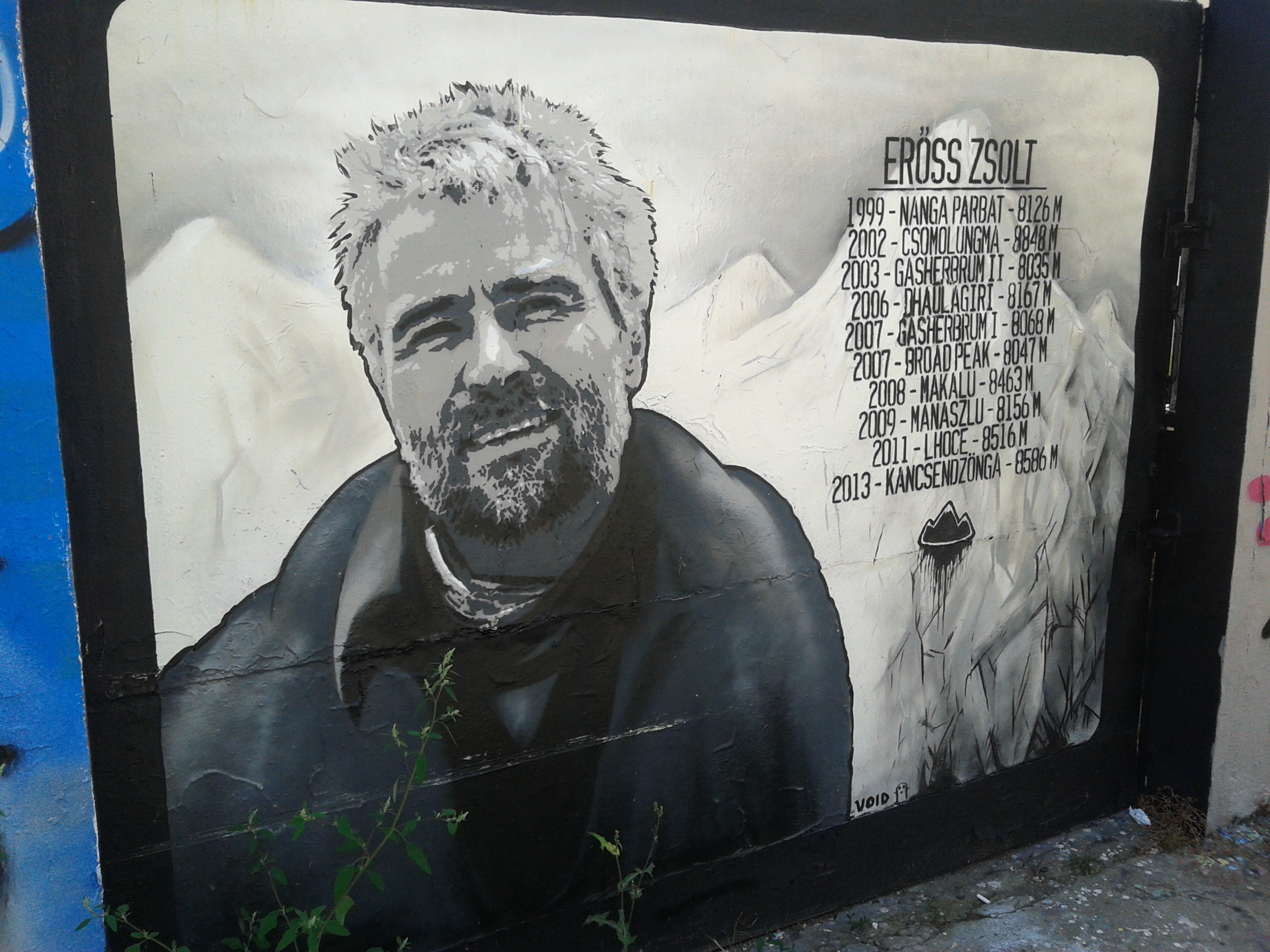
Street art at the Danube - Budapest, 2014

- 1999 - Nanga Parbat 8126 m in a new route (solo climb of the Mummery Rib, the glacier that lies between Ganalo Peak and Nanga Parbat)
- 2002 - Everest 8848 m
- 2003 - Gasherbrum II 8035 m
- 2006 - Dhaulagiri 8167 m
- 2007 - Hidden Peak 8068 m
- 2007 - Broad Peak 8047 m
- 2008 - Makalu 8481 m
- 2009 - Manaslu 8156 m
- 2011 - Lhotse 8516 m (with prosthetic leg)
- 2013 - Kangchenjunga 8586 m (with prosthetic leg)

== See also ==
- List of solved missing person cases (post-2000)
- List of deaths on eight-thousanders

== Other notable climbs ==
- 1990 - Elbrus 5642 m
- 1991 - Khan Tengri 6995 m, Pobeda peak 7439 m
- 1993 - Lenin Peak 7134 m
- 1994 - Pik 4 in Pamir Mountains 6400 m, Korzhenevskaya 7105 m, Communism Peak 7495 m, unnamed peak at 6200 m in Pamir, Tajikistan
- 1995 - attempt: Ogre (reached 7000 m)
- 1996 - 2 attempts for Everest (reached 8300 m)
- 1997 - south face of Satopanth until 7050 m
- 1999 - Ganalo Peak 6606 m
- 2000 - Distaghil Sar 7885 m, in new route
- 2001 - Aconcagua 6960 m
- 2003 - attempt for Hidden Peak in a new route (reached 8000 m)
- 2004 - Kilimanjaro 5895 m
- 2005 - attempt: K2 (reached 8300 m)
- 2010 - attempt: Cho-Oyu (reached 7100 m, with prosthetic leg)
- 2012 - attempt: Annapurna I (reached 7400 m, with prosthetic leg)

== Legacy ==
On 15 September 2013, a kopjafa (carved wooden grave post) was erected in his memory in the garden of the Pilisvörösvár Reformed Church, reminding him that he had been a resident of the city for 10 years.

The sports hall in Miercurea Ciuc (Csíkszereda) bears his name which was built in 2013.

A bust of Zsolt Erőss stands in front of the Salamon Ernő High School in Gheorgheni (Gyergyószentmiklós), where he completed his high school and graduated.

In 2022, a feature film, Heights and Depths (in Hungarian: Magasságok és mélységek) was released showing the loss of Zsolt Erőss and his widow's perspective of grief.

== Sources ==
- Erőss, Zsolt (2002). A Békás-szorostól a Mount Everestig fotóalbum (in Hungarian). Kaposvári Nyomda Kft. ISBN 963-86275-6-5.
- Földes, András (2002). Erőss Zsolt, a Mount Everest első magyar megmászójának története (in Hungarian). Budapest: Jaffa Kiadó. ISBN 963-86275-5-7.
