= Glacial lake =

Lake formed by a melted glacier

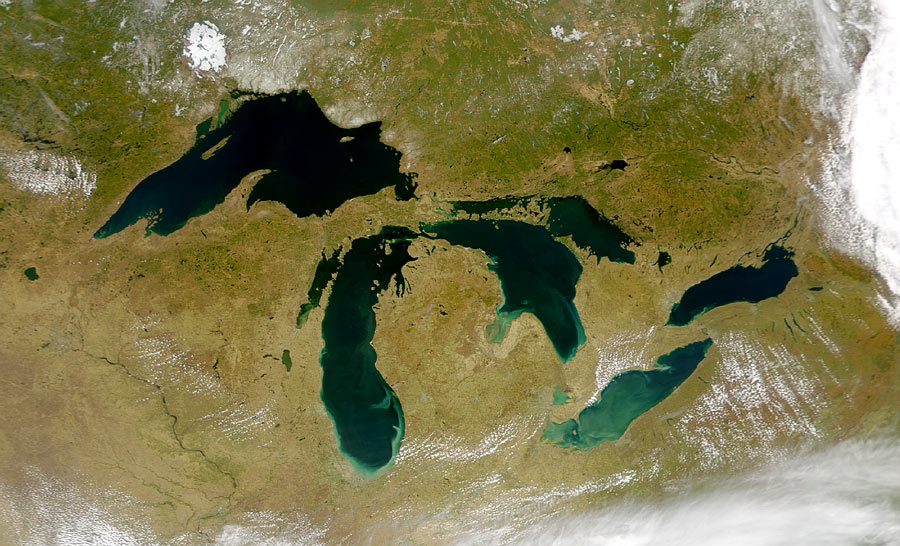
The Great Lakes as seen from space. The Great Lakes are the largest glacial lakes in the world.

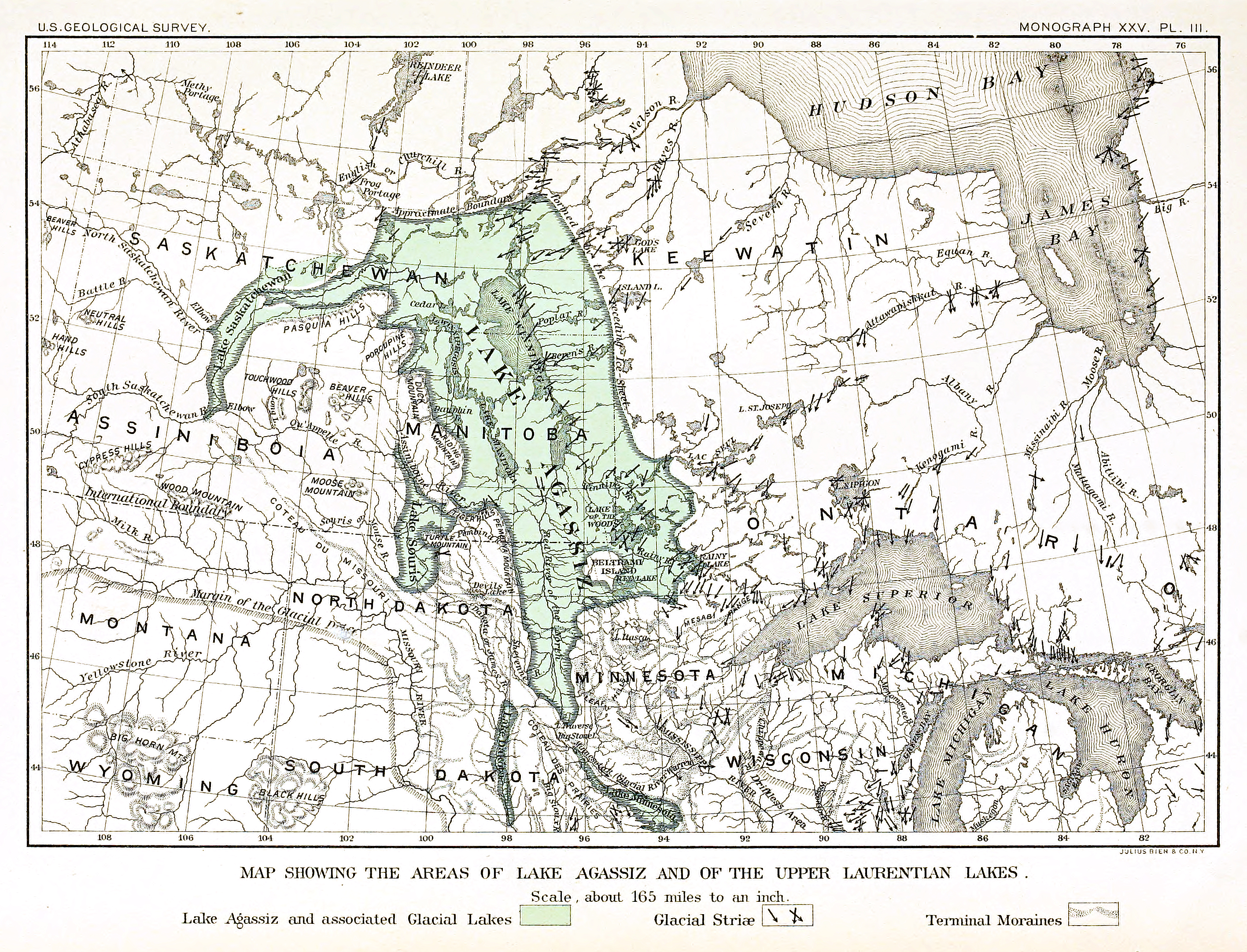
The prehistoric glacial Lake Agassiz once held more water than contained by all lakes in the world today.

A glacial lake is a body of water with origins from glacier activity. They are formed when a glacier erodes the land and then melts, filling the depression created by the glacier.

== Formation ==
Near the end of the last glacial period, roughly 10,000 years ago, glaciers began to retreat. A retreating glacier often left behind large deposits of ice in hollows between drumlins or hills. As the ice age ended, these melted to create lakes. These lakes are often surrounded by drumlins, along with other evidence of the glacier such as moraines, eskers and erosional features such as striations and chatter marks.

These lakes are clearly visible in aerial photos of landforms in regions that were glaciated during the last ice age.

The formation and characteristics of glacial lakes vary between location and can be classified into glacial erosion lake, ice-blocked lake, moraine-dammed lake, other glacial lake, supraglacial lake, and subglacial lake.

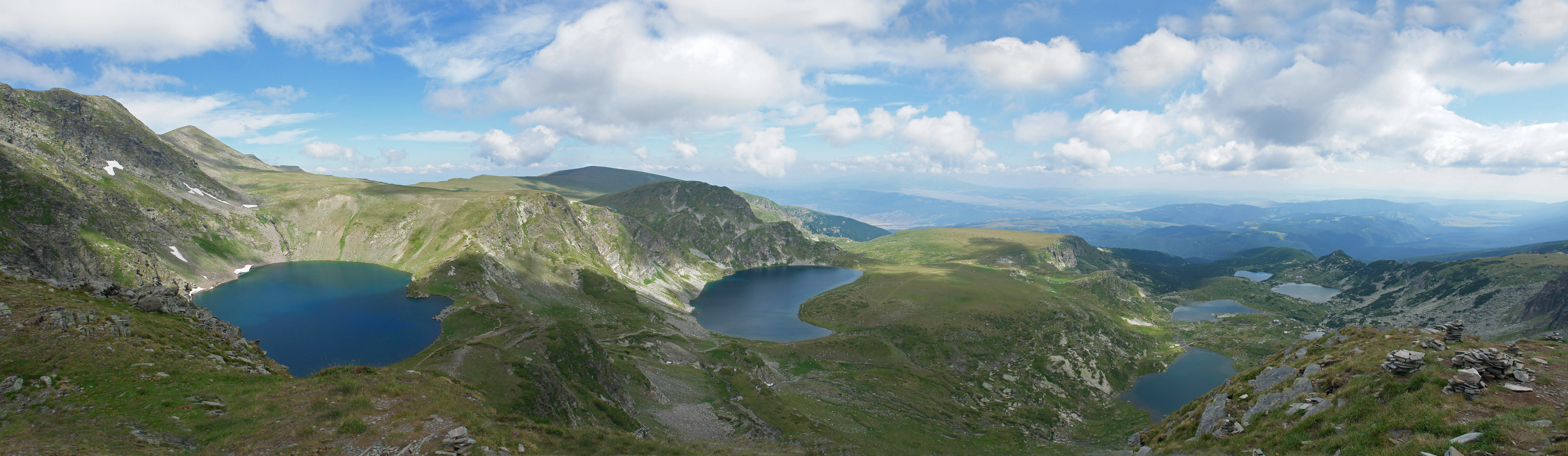
The Seven Rila Lakes in Rila mountain, Bulgaria, are of glacial origin.

=== Glacial lakes and changing climate ===
Since the glaciation of the Little Ice Age, Earth has lost more than 50% of its glaciers. This along with the current increase in retreating glaciers caused by climate change has created a shift from frozen to liquid water, increasing the extent and volume of glacial lakes around the world. Most glacial lakes present today can be found in Asia, Europe, and North America. The area which will see the greatest increase in lake formation is the Southern Tibetan Plateau region from debris covered glaciers. This increase in glacial lake formation also indicates an increase in occurrence of glacial lake outburst flood events caused by damming and subsequent breaking of moraine and ice.

== Sediments ==
The amount of sediment found in glacial lakes varies, and has a general stratigraphic sequence of organic muds, glacial clays, silty clays, and sands based on time of formation.

Over time the glacial lake sediments are subjected to change. As seen in the English Lake District, the layers of the sediments at the bottom of the lakes contain evidence of the rate of erosion. The elemental make up of the sediments are not associated with the lakes themselves, but by the migration of the elements within the soil, such as iron and manganese.

The distribution of these elements, within the lake bed, are attributed to the condition of the drainage basin and the chemical composition of the water.

Sediment deposition can also be influenced by animal activity; including the distribution of biochemical elements, which are elements that are found in organic organisms, such as phosphorus and sulfur.

The amount of halogens and boron found in the sediments accompanies a change in erosional activity. The rate of deposition reflects the amount of halogen and boron in the deposited sediments.

The scouring action of the glaciers pulverizes minerals in the rock over which the glacier passes. These pulverized minerals become sediment at the bottom of the lake, and some of the rock flour becomes suspended in the water column. These suspended minerals support a large population of algae, making the water appear green.

Glacial lake sediments also archive changes in geochemistry and pollen records as a result of climate change and human activities. During the transition from the Last Glacial Period to the Holocene climatic optimum, soil development was enhanced, whereas early human activities such as deforestation have resulted in elevated soil erosion. These events can be reflected in geochemistry and isotope signatures in the lake sediments.

== Biotic ecosystem ==
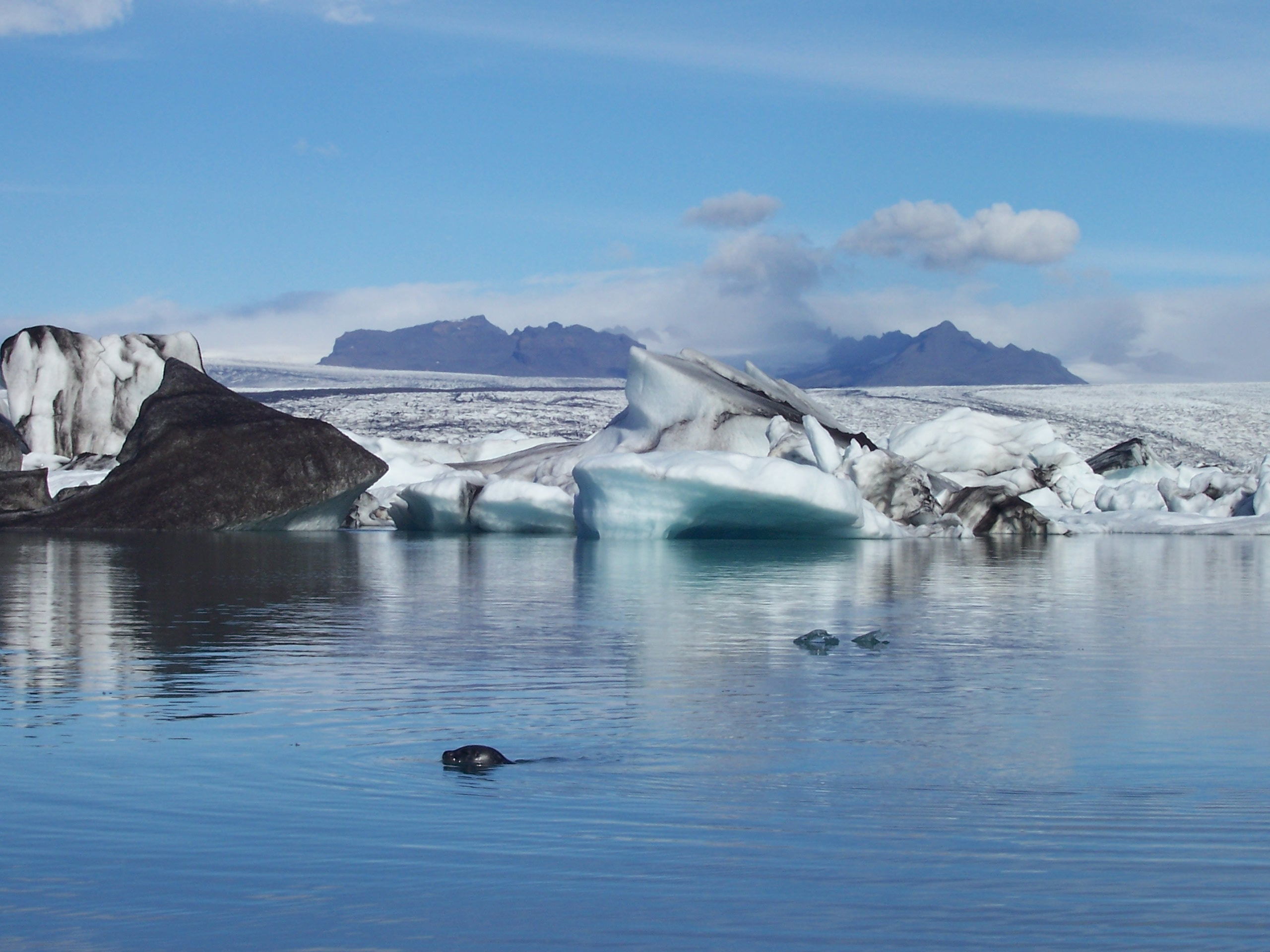
Seal at Jökulsárlón glacial lagoon in Iceland

Biodiversity and productivity tend to be lower in glacial lakes as only cold-tolerant and cold-adapted species can withstand their harsh conditions. Glacial rock flour and low nutrient levels create an oligotrophic environment where few species of plankton, fish and benthic organisms reside.

Before becoming a lake the first stages of glacial recession melt enough freshwater to form a shallow lagoon. In the case of Iceland's Jökulsárlón glacial lagoon located on the edge of the Atlantic Ocean, tides bring in an array of fish species to the edge of the glacier. These fish attract an abundance of predators from birds to marine mammals, that are searching for food. These predators include fauna such as, seals, arctic terns and arctic skua.

Glacial lakes that have been formed for a long period of time have a more diverse ecosystem of fauna originating from neighboring tributaries or other glacial refugia. For example, many native species of the great lakes basin entered via the Mississippi basin refugia within the past 14,000 years.

== Societal perspectives ==
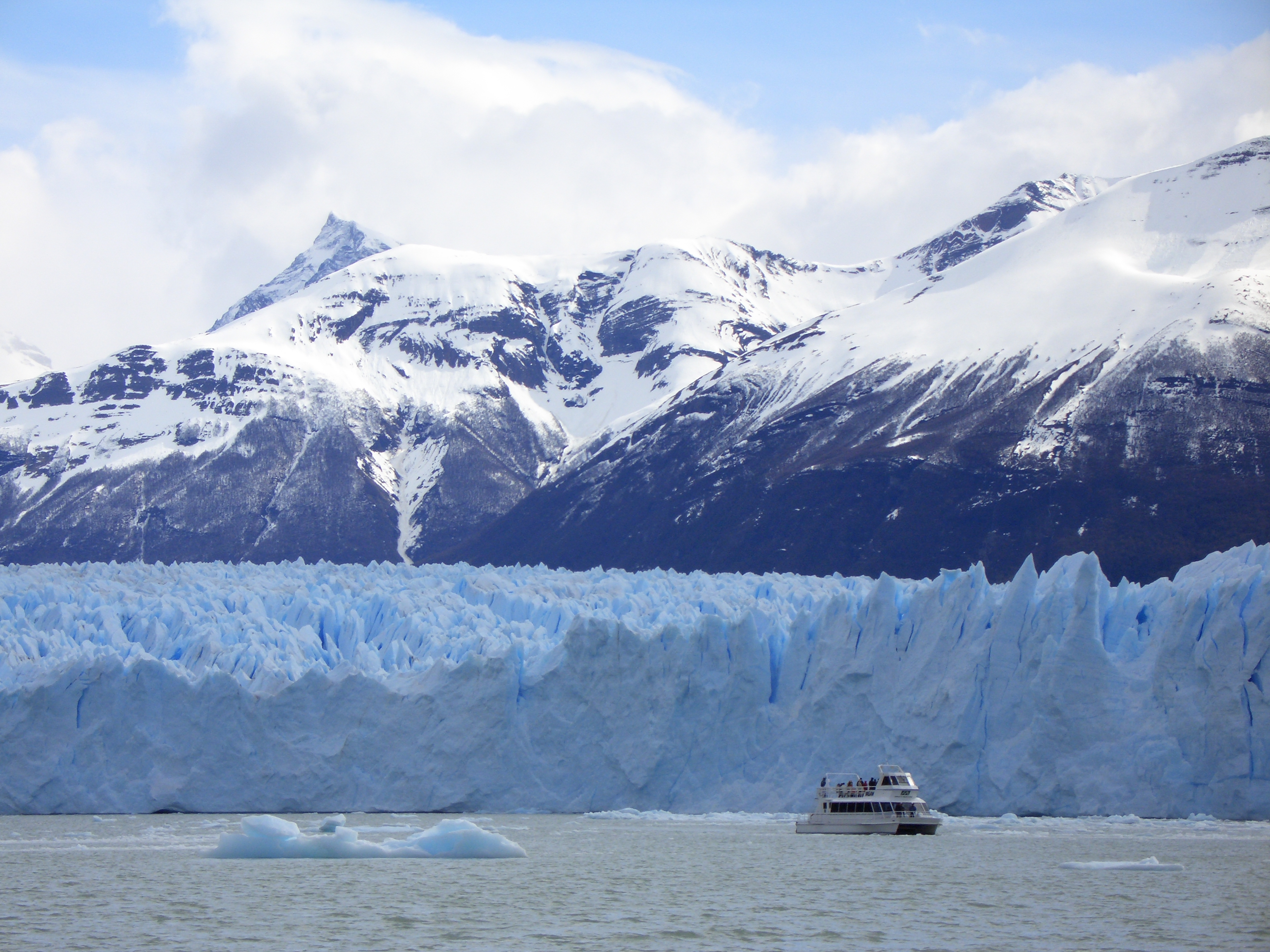
Argentino glacial lake at the base of Perito Moreno glacier in Argentina

Glacial lakes act as fresh water storage for the replenishing of a region's water supply and serve as potential electricity producers from hydropower.

Glacial lakes' aesthetic nature can also stimulate economic activity through the attraction of the tourism industry. Thousands of tourists visit the Jökulsárlón glacial lagoon in Iceland annually to take part in commercial boat tours and every two to four years thousands visit the Argentino glacial lake in Argentina to witness the collapse of the cyclically formed arch of ice from the Perito Moreno glacier, making it one of the largest travel destinations in Patagonia.

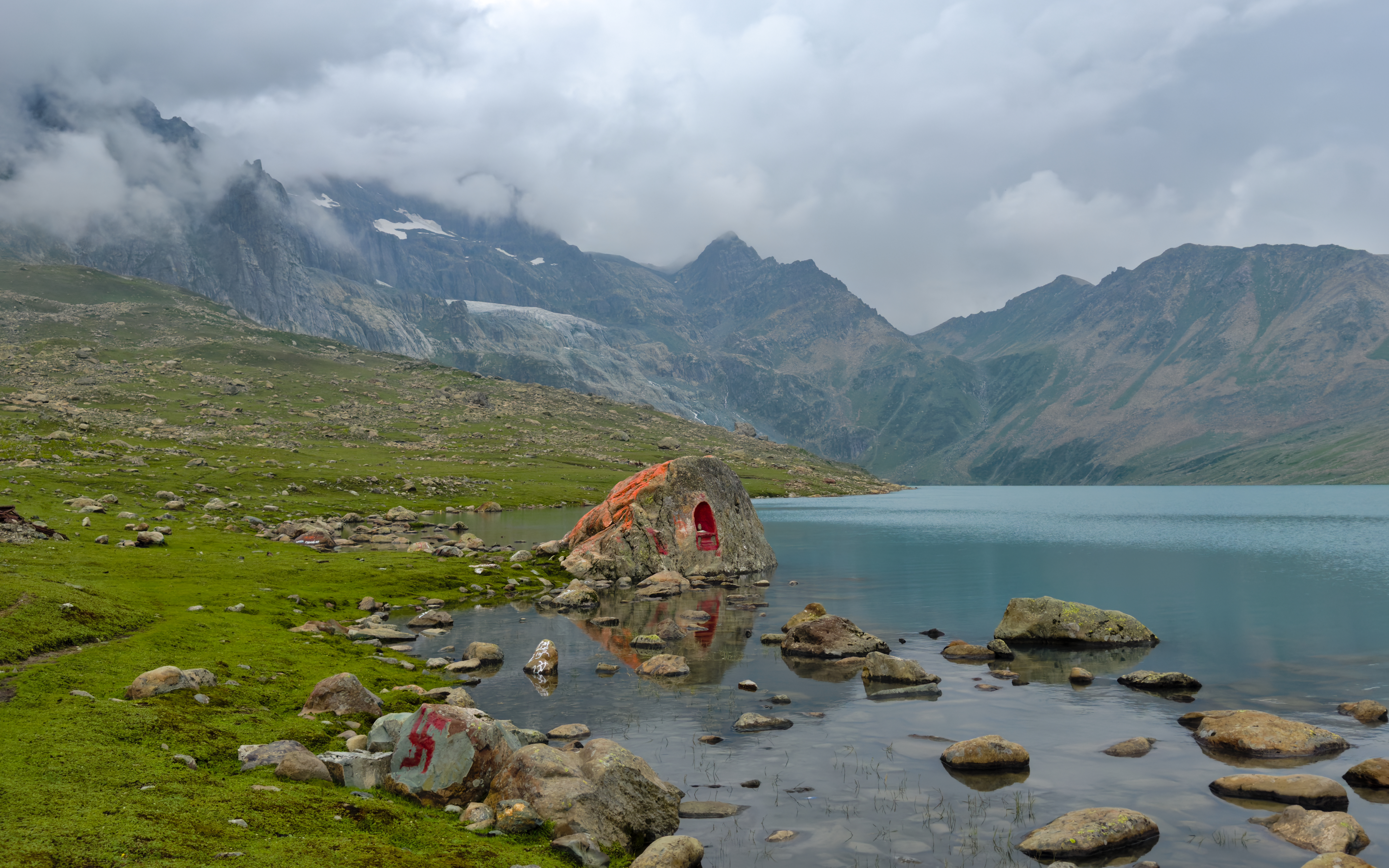
A shrine dedicated to Hindu deity Shiva on the shore of Gangabal Lake in India

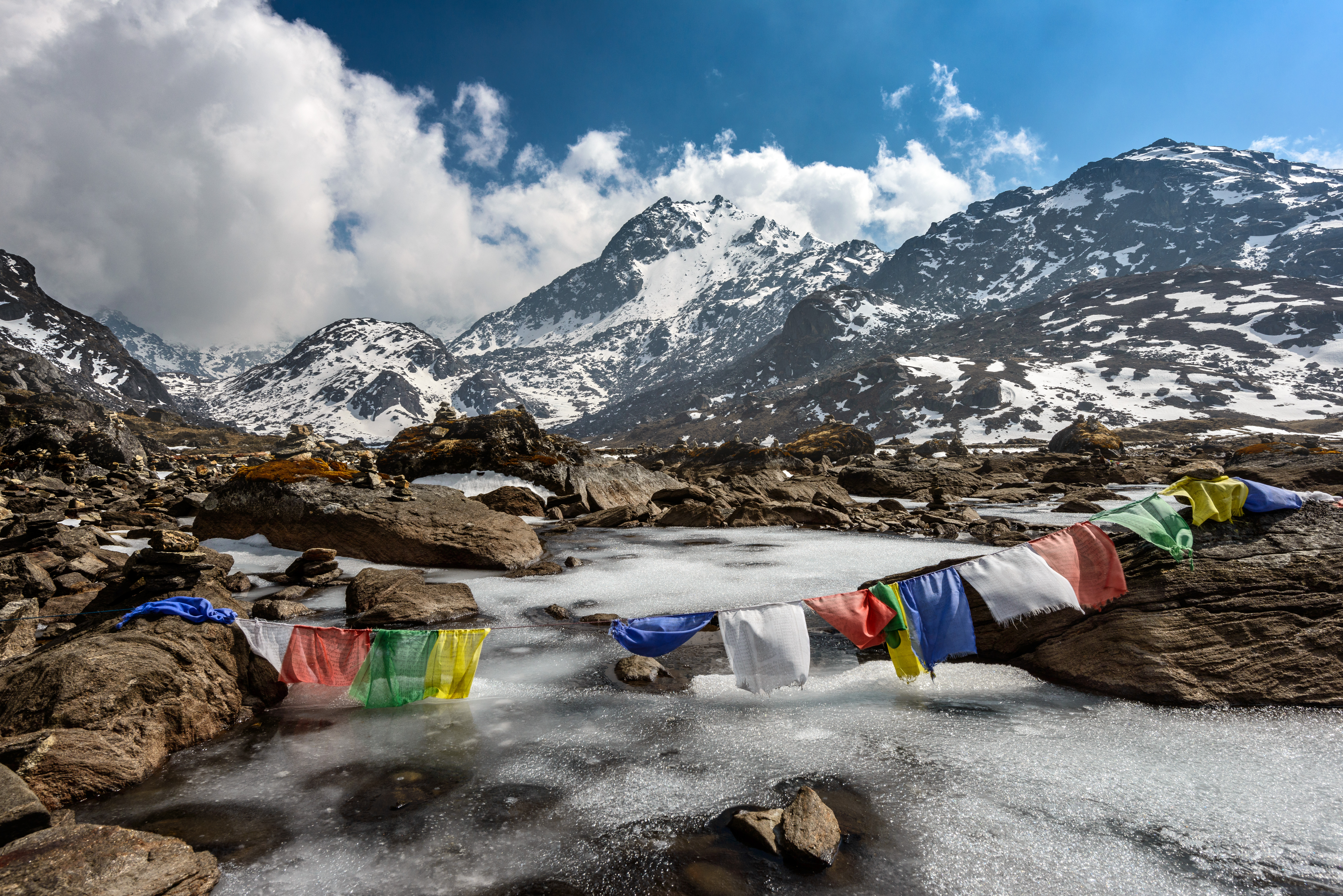
Prayer flags over a frozen section of Gosaikunda Lake in Nepal

Several glacial lakes in the Himalayas are considered sacred in Indian religions. Examples include the Manasarovar Lake, considered sacred in the Hindu, Jain, Buddhist and Bon religions, the Hemkund Lake, sacred to Sikhs and Hindus, the Gokyo Lakes, sacred to Hindus and Buddhists, the Gurudongmar Lake, sacred to Buddhists and Sikhs, and the Gangabal, Konsarnag, Manimahesh, Satopanth and Gosaikunda lakes, among others, all sacred in Hinduism. Many people undertake pilgrimages to these lakes.

== Gallery ==
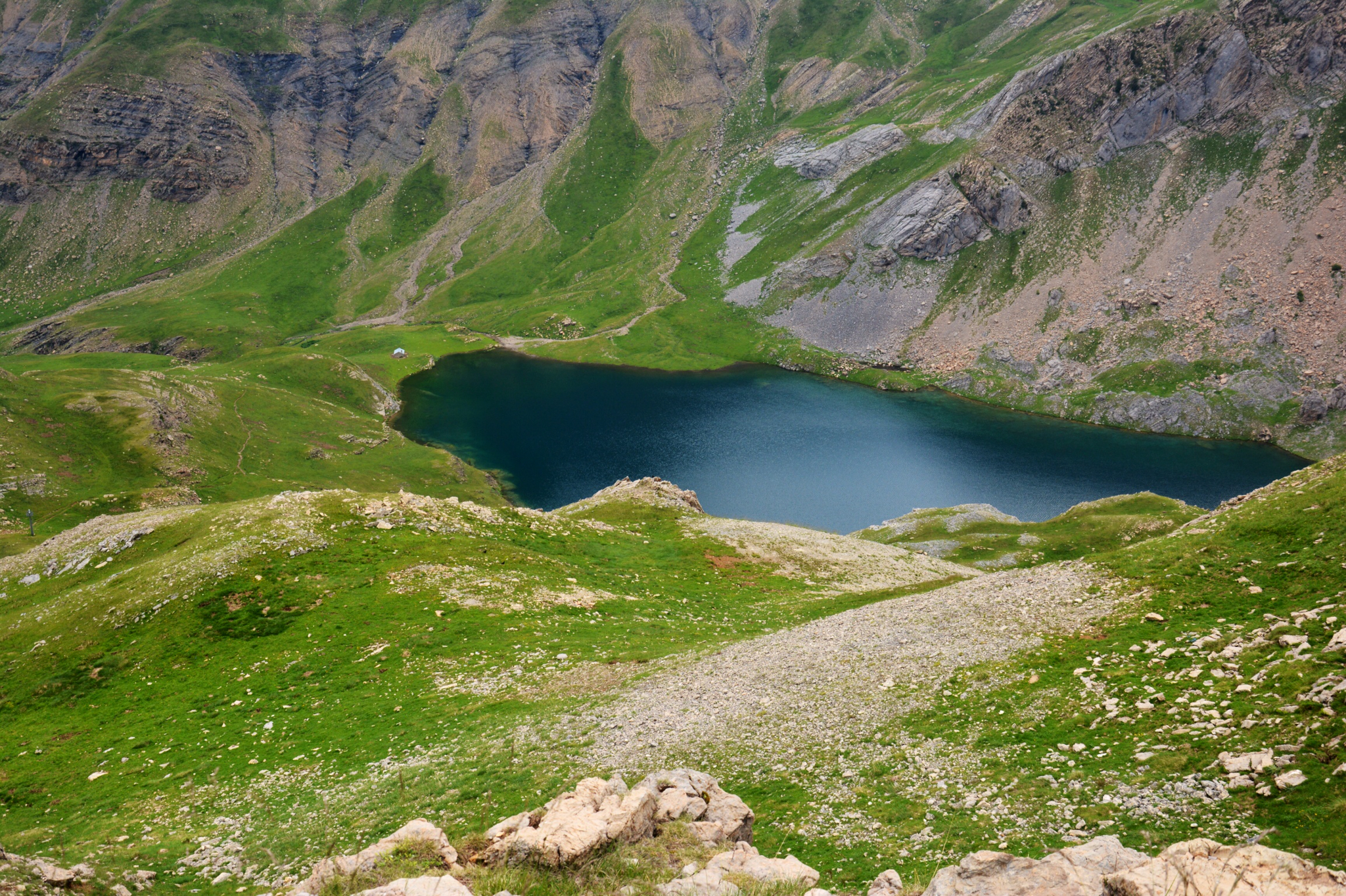
Ibón de Sabocos, in the Tena Valley, Spain. "Ibón" is the local word in Aragonese for glacial lakes.

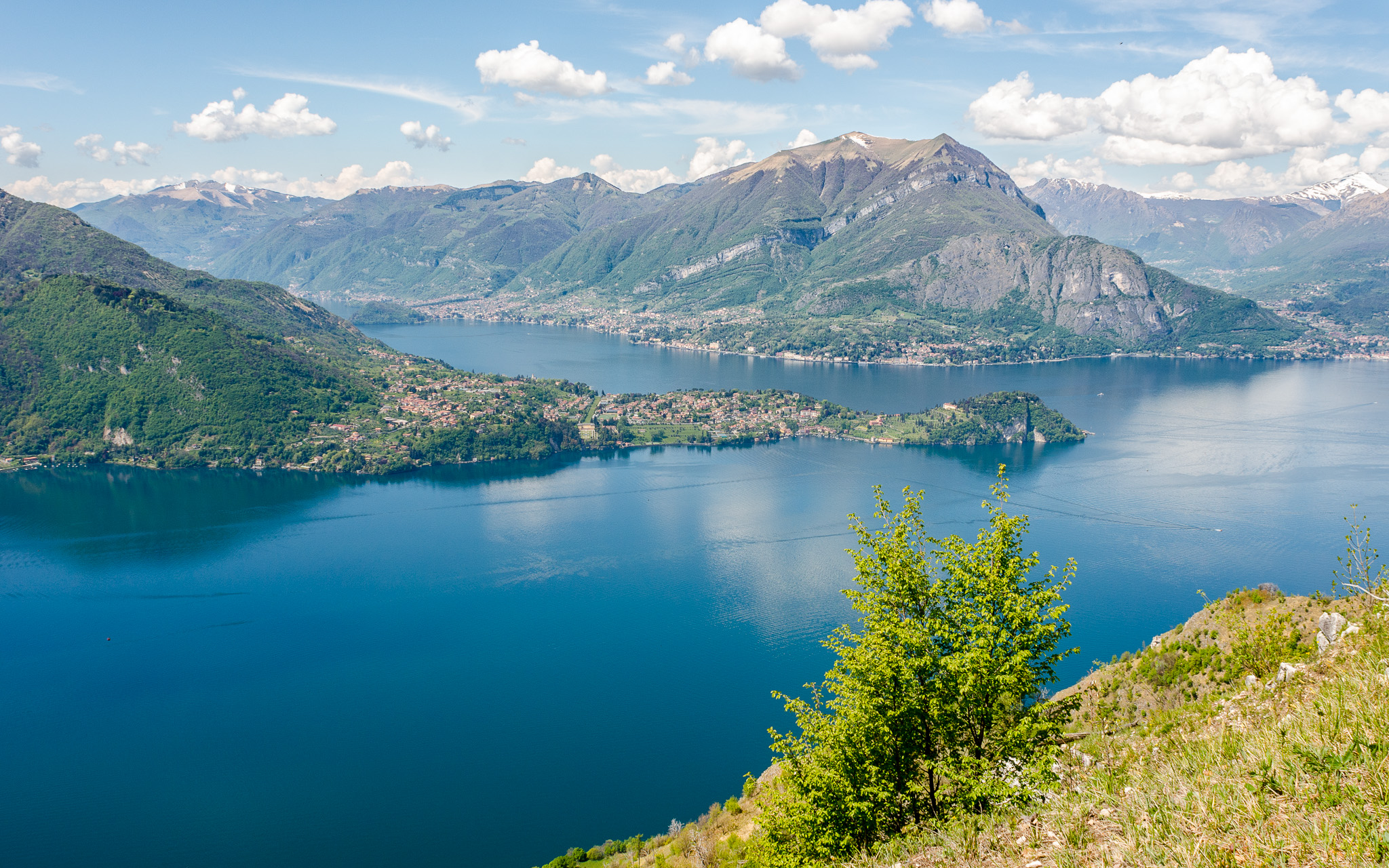
View of Lake Como in Lombardy, Northern Italy, a glacial lake in the Alps

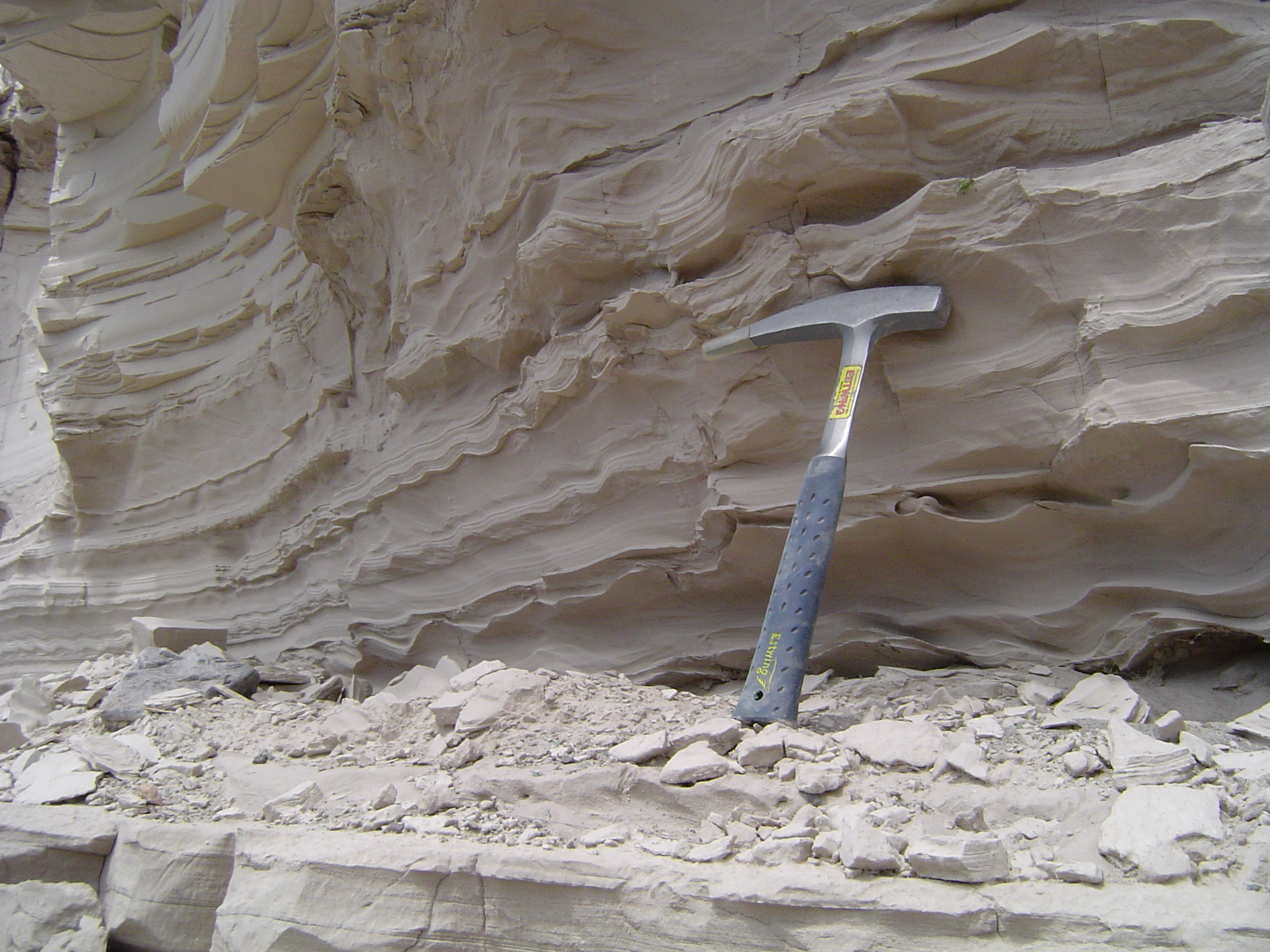
Laminated claystone from Glacial Lake Missoula, Montana, United States

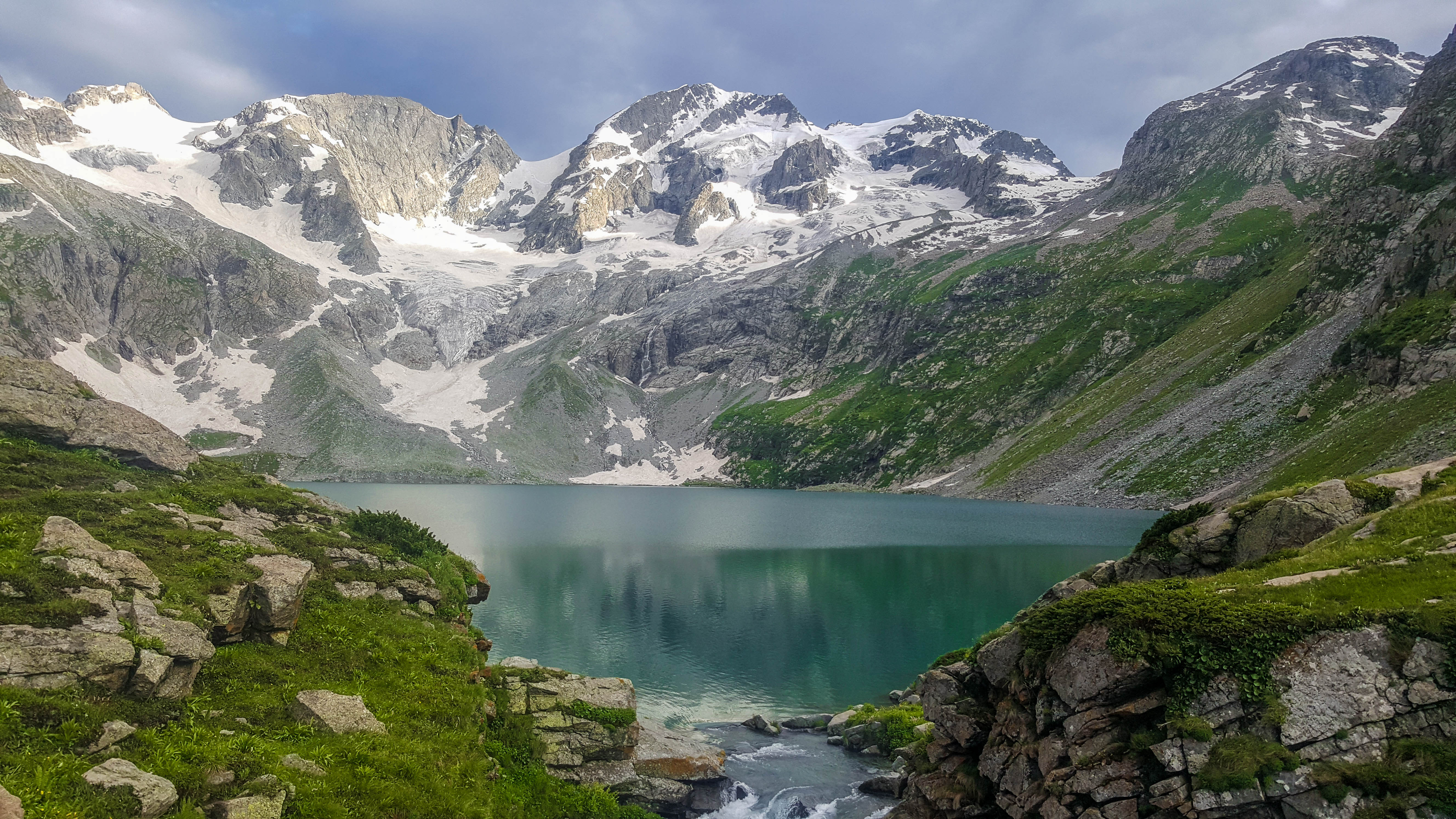
Katora Lake in Kumrat Valley, Pakistan

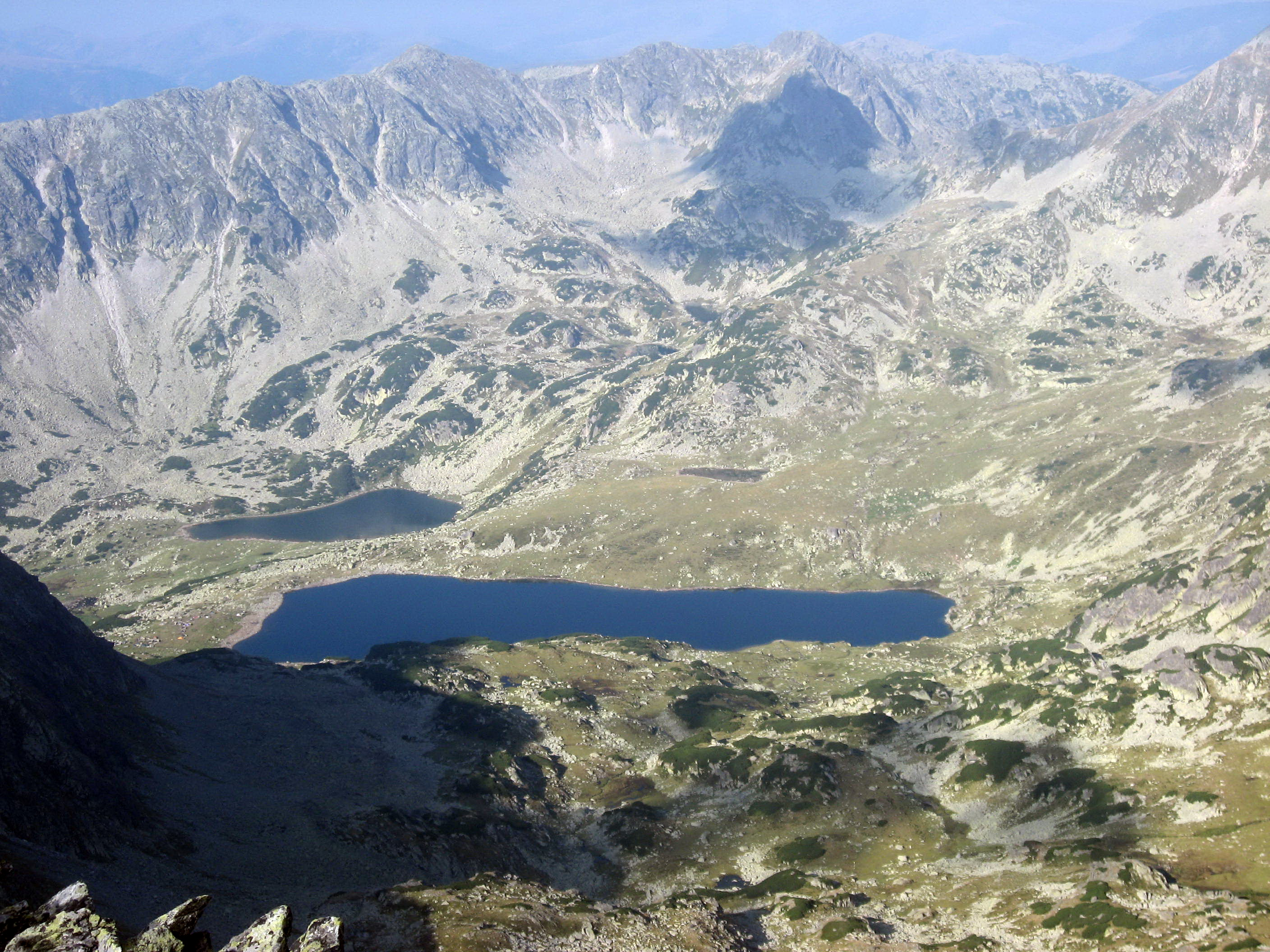
Glacier cirque lake Bucura, the largest glacier lake in Romania.

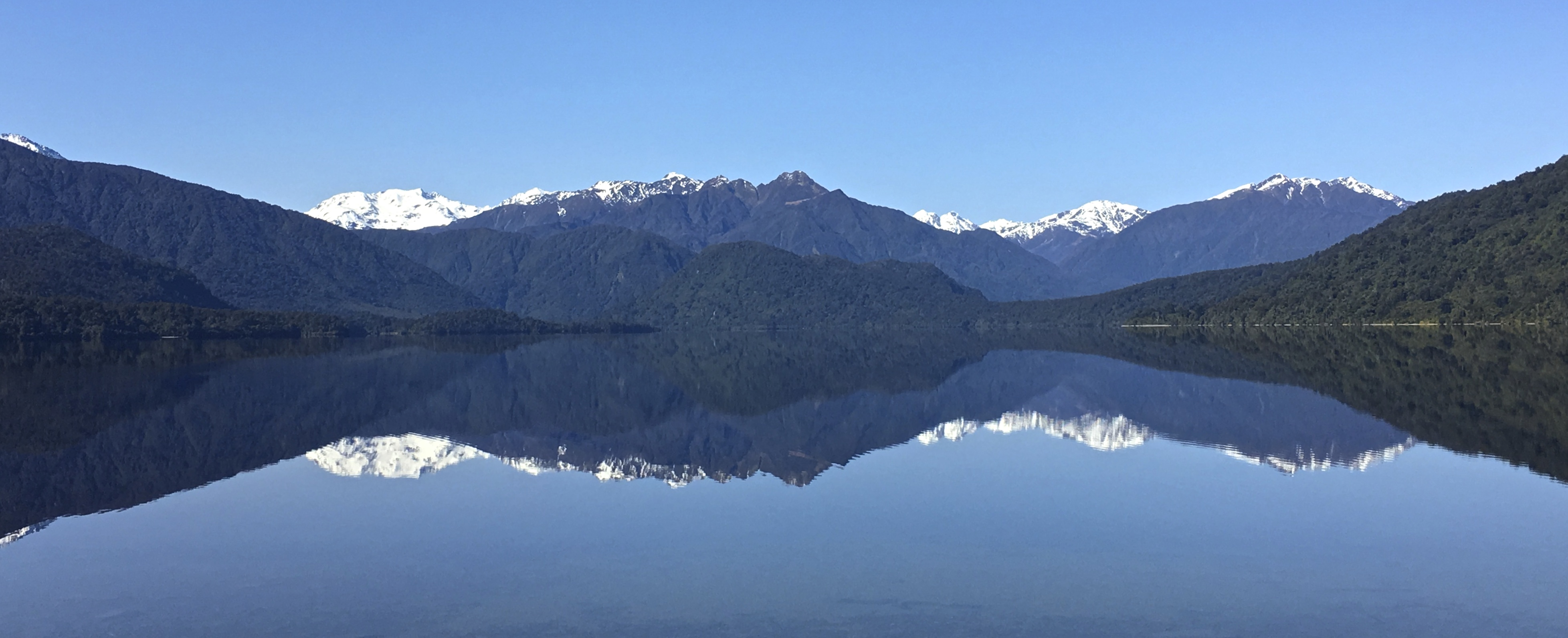
Lake Kaniere in the West Coast region of New Zealand

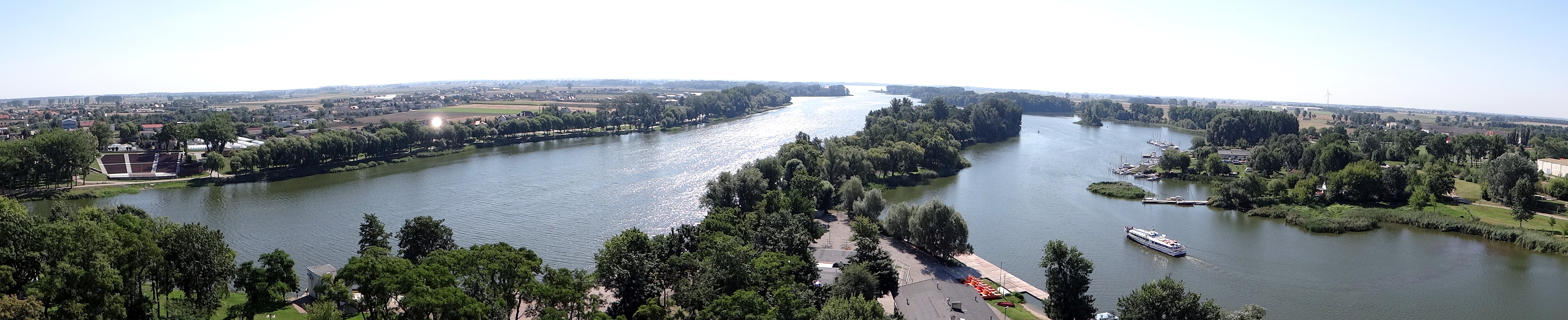
Lake Gopło in the Kuyavia region of Poland, view from the mouse tower

== See also ==
- Proglacial lake
- Moraine-dammed lake
- Subglacial lake
- Zungenbecken
