= Vasudhara Falls =

Waterfall in Uttarakhand, India

Vasudhara Falls is a waterfall situated near Badrinath, in Uttarakhand, India.

== Geography ==
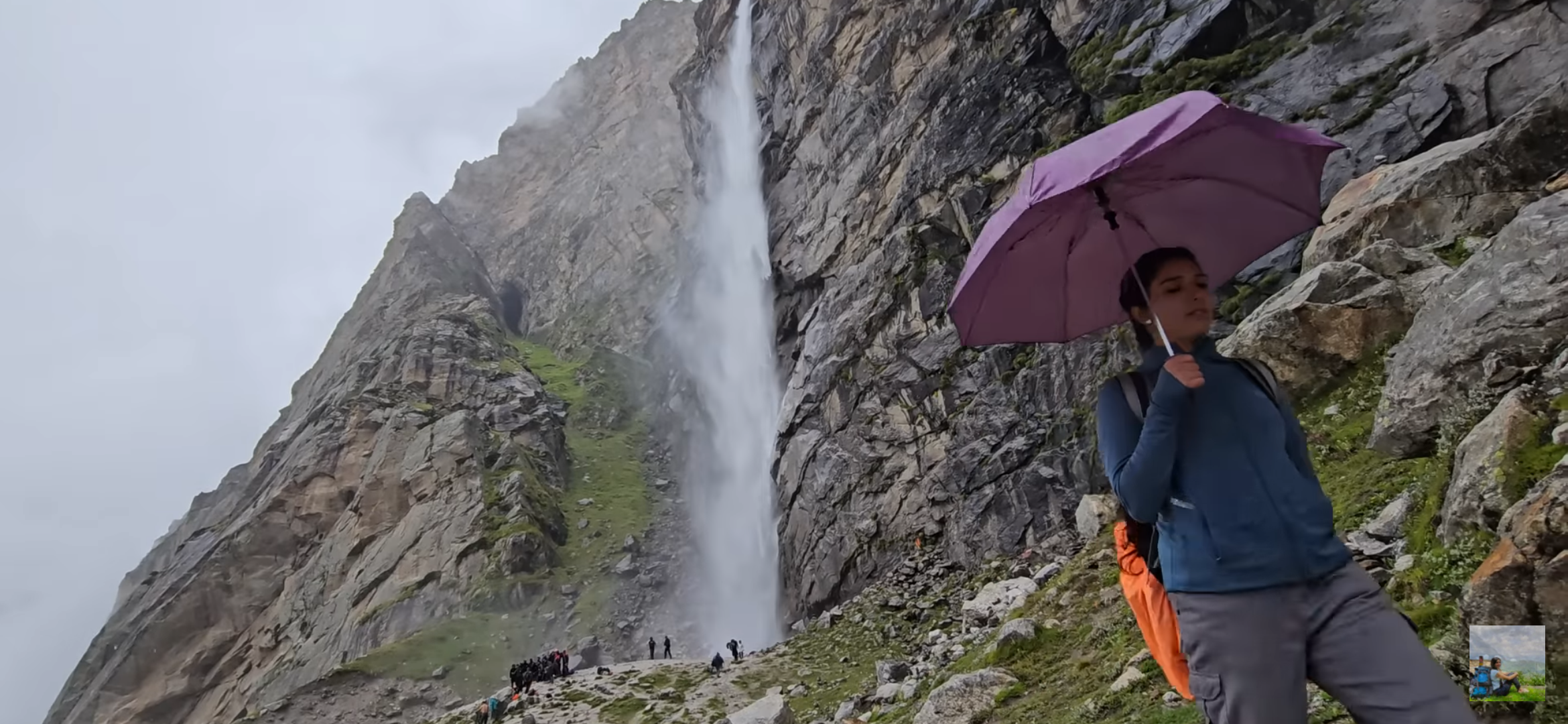
Vasudhara Fall, Feb 2025

Uttarakhand is surrounded by waterfalls. Vasudhara waterfall is set in the background of a 145 m cliff. Nearby mountains are Chaukhamba, Nilkantha and Balakun.

The falls flow into the river Alaknanda, flowing towards Badrinath Temple. The distance from Badrinath to Vasudhara is 9 km.

The height of this waterfall is 400 ft (120 m).

Satopanth glacier sits near the bottom of Vasudhara. Satopanth Tal is 25 km from Badrinath. Laxmi van (forest) is on the way to Satopanth glacier from Vasudhara.

== See also ==
- List of waterfalls
- List of waterfalls in India
- List of waterfalls in India by height
