= Satopanth Glacier =

Glacier in Uttarakhand, India

Satopanth
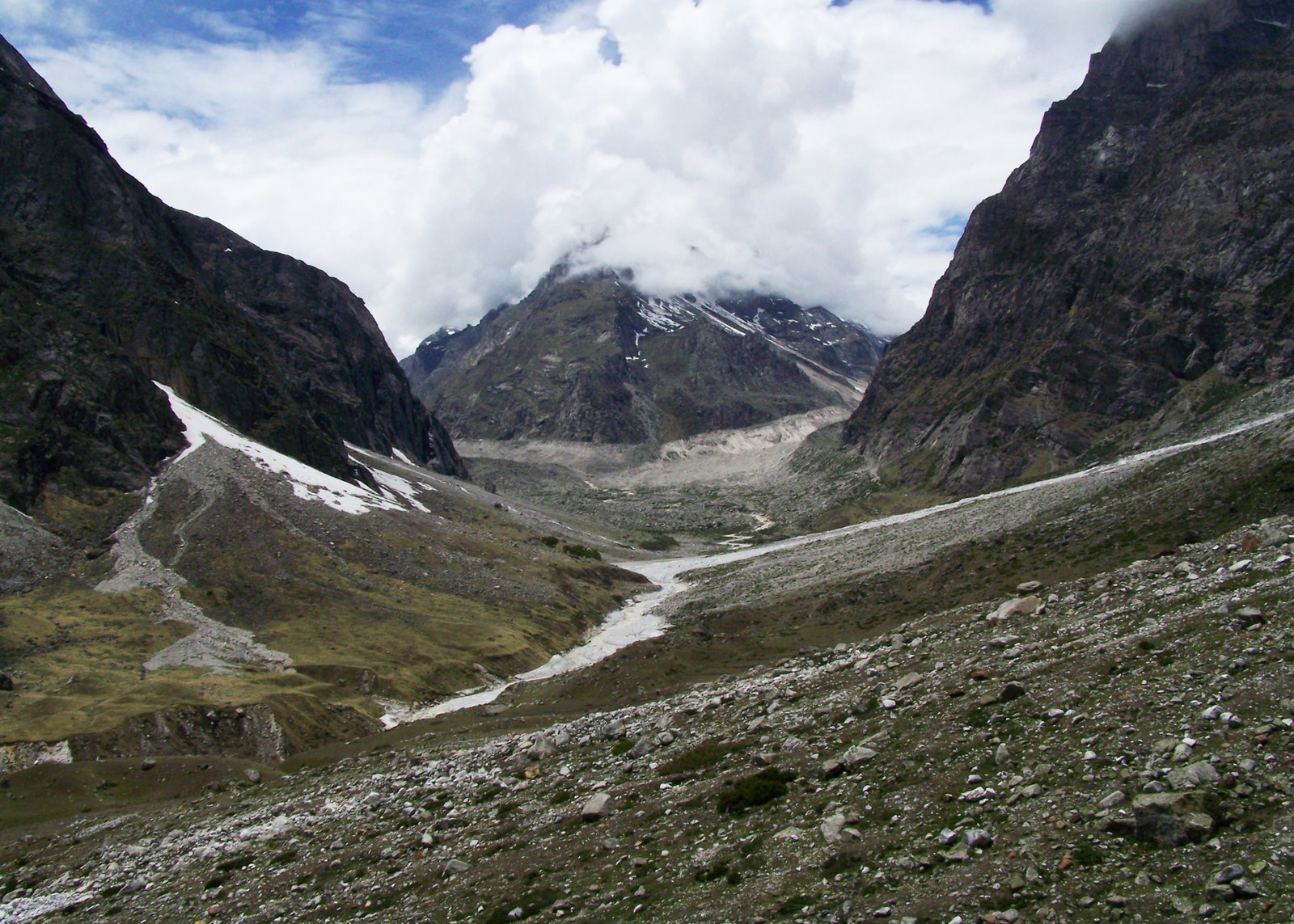
- Balkun Peak dividing Satopanth Glacier in the left and Bhagirath Kharak Glacier in the right.

- Location within Uttarakhand Location within India
- Interactive map of Satopanth
- Type: Mountain glacier
- Location: Uttarakhand, India
- Coordinates: 30°45′12″N 79°21′51″E

The Satopanth glacier is situated in the Indian state of Uttarakhand. The river Alaknanda, one of the primary headstreams of the Ganges, has its origin in the Satopanth glacier. The glacier is one of the most popular glaciers in Uttarakhand among tourists. Mountaineers consider it somewhat challenging to scale.

== Name origin ==
The term ‘Satopanth’ is perhaps derived from two words – ‘Sat-o’ meaning of truth, and ‘Panth’ meaning path or way. So its literal meaning is the path of truth.

== Geography ==
Satopanth glacier lies on the northwest side of Nilkantha, a major peak of the Garhwal division of the Himalayas. It sits below a 2,500 m (8,200 ft) face of the peak. Originating at a height of 7000 meters from the peaks of the Chaukhamba (7068m) and the Badrinath (6974m) mountains, the glacier spreads over a vast expanse of 13 km, this glacier melts into water at an altitude of 3810 meters. The Narayan Parvat and the foot of Balkun or Balakun peak, touches the glacier.

Scientists claim that the Satopanth Glacier is retreating, though not as fast as the Gangotri Glacier. So, a number of preventive measures have been taken. Also, as the glacier lies quite near the Indo-Tibet Border, photography is strictly prohibited.

== Tourist Information ==
The Satopanth Glacier can be approached from Joshimath in the Chamoli sub-division, by following the Badrinath and Mana (3128 m above sea level) road. From Mana, the route follows the course of the Alaknanda River. On the route, you will come across a waterfall named Vasudhara Falls, lying on the right bank of the Alaknanda River. The snout of Satopanth Glacier opens at about 5 km upwards from Vasudhara Falls. Two kilometers down the valley, the left bank of the river offers good conditions for camping.

Satopanth Glacier can only be approached in summer months. Treks to this glacier is a very sought-after adventure, for tourists in Uttarakhand.

The nearest airport is at Jollygrant, about 221 km, the nearest rail station is at Rishikesh and is well-connected by roads with Dehradun, Haridwar, Rishikesh, Nanital, and Almora.

== See also ==
- List of glaciers of India
