= Badri Narayanan temple =

Hindu temple in Madurai district, Tamil Nadu, India

Coordinates: 10.061957°N 78.211908°E

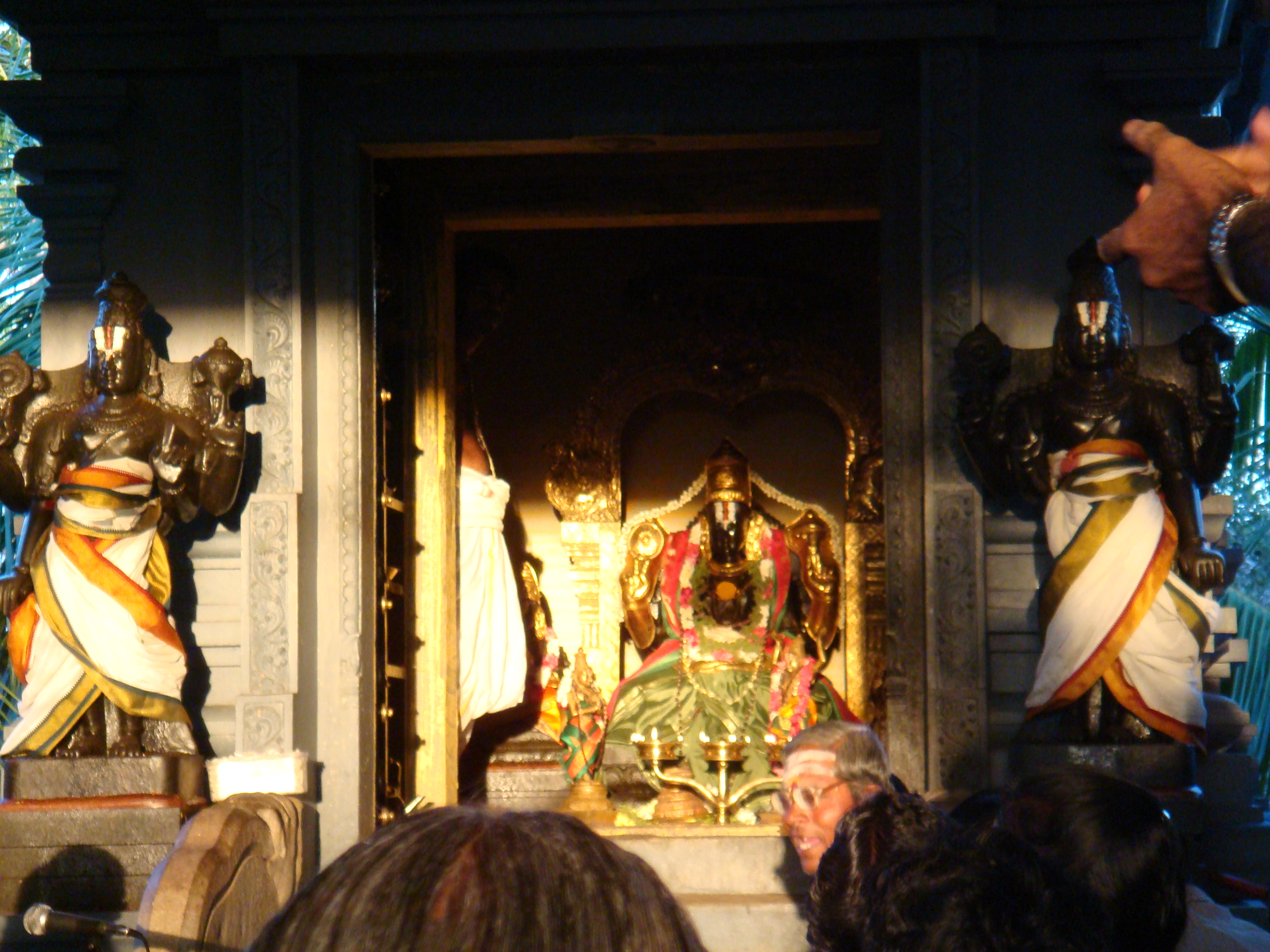
Sun rays falling upon the idol of Lord Badri Narayanan.

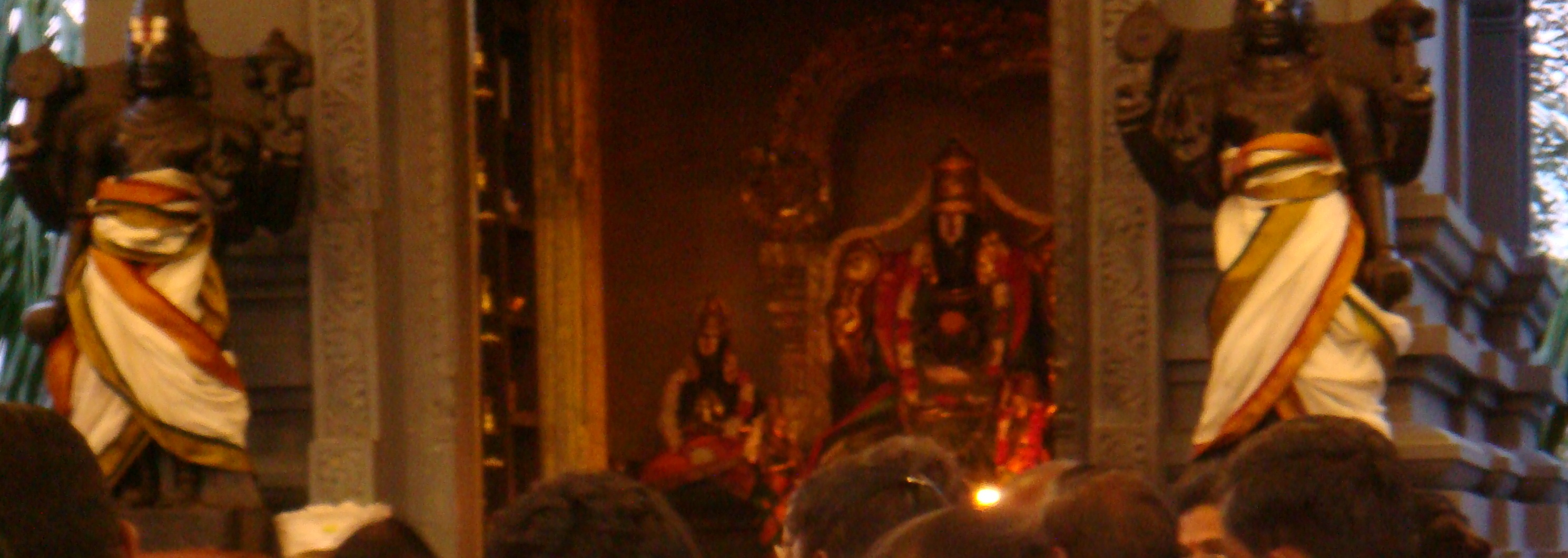
View of Lord Badri Narayanan.

Badri Narayanan temple (Tamil: பத்ரி நாராயணன் கோயில்) is a Hindu temple in the Madurai District in the entrance of Alagar Koil in the state of Tamil Nadu, India.

The temple is built in the style of the Badrinath temple, Uttarakhand.

Balaji is in a seated position in this temple. An idol of Adi Shankaracharya — an important Hindu saint in 8th century AD — is placed alongside of the temple.

The principal idol represents Vishnu in a meditative posture and is flanked by Nara-Narayana.

There is a large date tree in the back of the temple's shrine, behind the statue of Badri Narayana.

Some of the other images include Lakshmi (Vishnu's consort), Garuda (Vishnu's mount), Anjaneya, and Ganesha.

As per the legend, Kallalagar visits the temple in the eve of the Chittirai festival, one of the famous festivals in Tamil Nadu. The Kallalagar starts his journey from the Alagar Koil crossing the Badri Narayanan Shrine. During this time, he visits Vandiyur, near the Vaigai River, on the eastern outskirts of Madurai. It is believed that he realizes that he is too late for his sister's wedding, so he refuses to cross the river and returns disappointed to Alagar Koil.

Daily pujas and monthly bhajans are held on the temple premises.
