= Ganalo Peak =

Mountain in Pakistan

Ganalo Peak گینالو
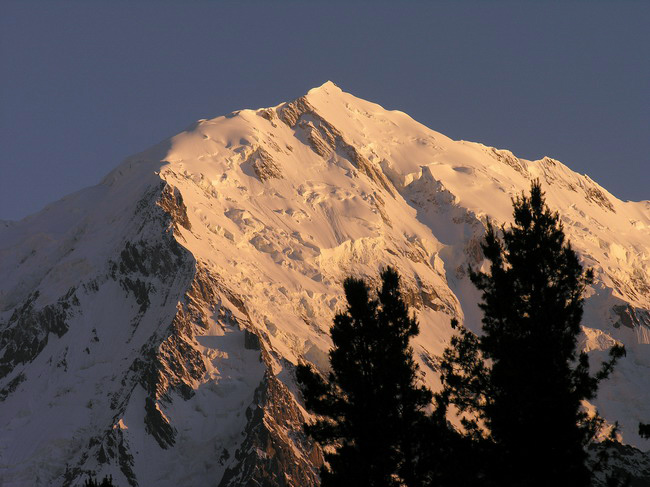
- Ganalo Peak at sunset

Highest point
- Elevation: 6,608 m (21,680 ft)
- Listing: List of mountains in Pakistan
- Coordinates: 35°17′22.58″N 74°33′16.81″E

Geography
- Location within Gilgit Baltistan Location within Pakistan
- Location: Gilgit–Baltistan, Pakistan
- Parent range: Himalayas, Nanga Parbat

Climbing
- First ascent: Hans Lobenhoffer, Ludwig Chicken (July 23, 1939)

Ganalo Peak (Urdu: گینالو) is a subsidiary peak of Nanga Parbat in Pakistan's western Himalayas. Anchoring the rock and ice battlements northwest of Nanga Parbat's main summit, Ganalo rises 9,000 feet above the Rakhiot Glacier and 8,000 feet above the nearby Rakhiot Base Camp. The remote village of Beyal rests at its northern base. Ganalo Peak is easily viewed from Fairy Meadows, a popular trekking destination high above the Indus River.

== Climbing history ==
In 1983, Emilio Hernando, Jesus Gomez, Mikel Martínez and Angel Landa attempted to summit the then unclimbed Ganalo Peak. The team made it to the western foresummit (6400 meters, 21,000 feet), but had to turn back after discovering the real summit would require traversing as 1 1/4-mile difficult ridge.

In 1990 a German and Pakistani team preparing to climb Nanga Parbat successfully used Ganalo Peak to acclimatize, reaching 5300 meters.

In 2022, Italian climbers Francois Cazzanelli and Pietro Picco acclimatized on Ganalo Peak before opening a new route on Nanga Parbat’s Diamir face. The pair reached 6100 meters.
