= Balakun =

Mountain in Uttarakhand, India

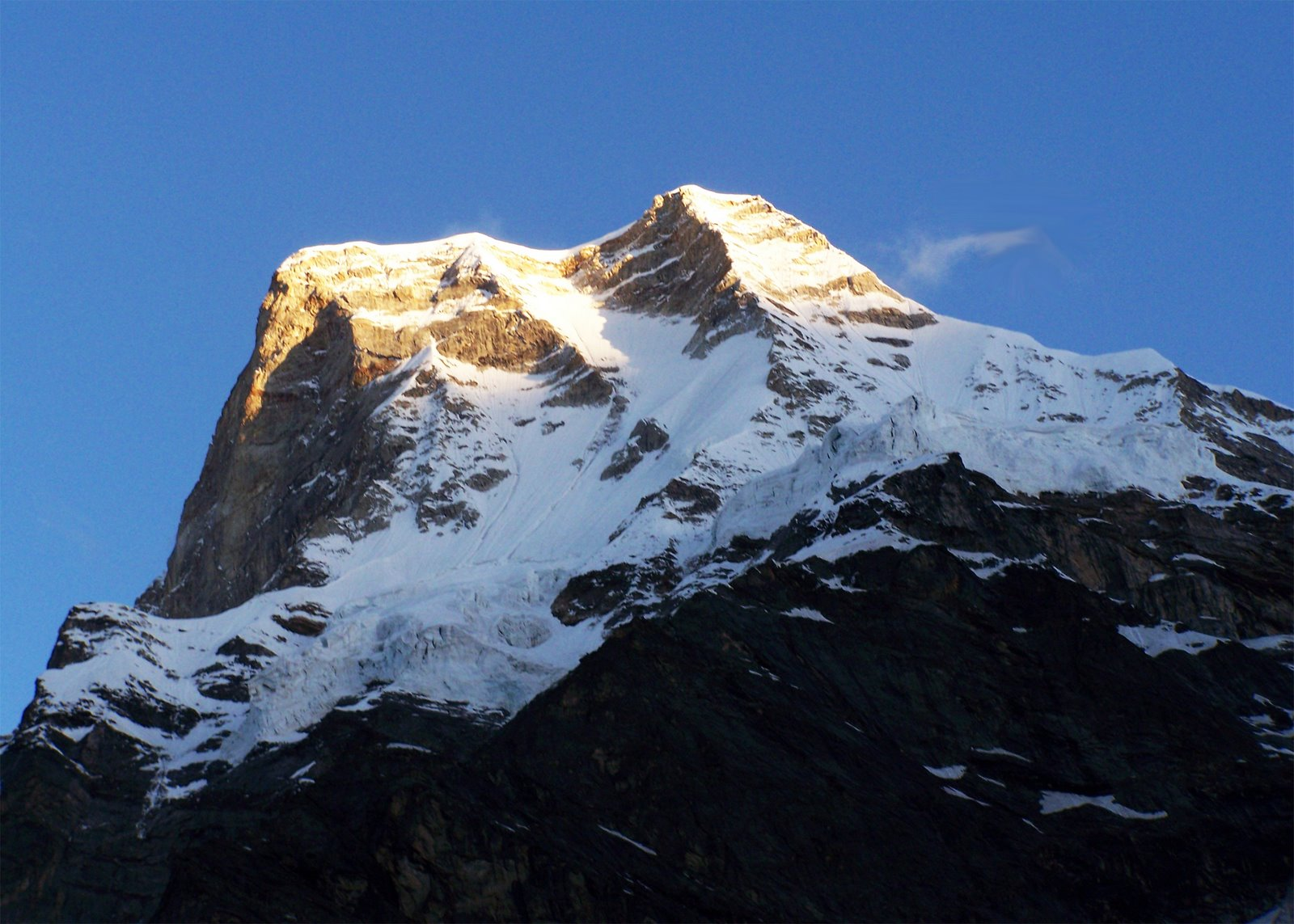
- Balakun

Highest point
- Elevation: 6,471 m (21,230 ft)
- Prominence: 611 m (2,005 ft)
- Listing: Mountains of Uttarakhand
- Coordinates: 30°45′36″N 79°20′24″E

Geography
- Location within India
- Location: Chamoli, Uttarakhand, India
- Parent range: Garhwal Himalaya

Climbing
- First ascent: 1973 By six-man team of ITBP led by Hukum Singh
- Easiest route: rock/snow/ice

Balakun is a Himalayan peak situated in the Chamoli district of Uttarakhand state of India. The Balakun peak has the summit at an altitude of 6,471 m (21,230 ft) in the Garhwal Himalayas. Balakun Peak is located 16 km from Badrinath. Balakun is situated north west to Badrinath. Balakun is situated between Bhagirathi Kharak glacier and Satopanth glacier. The peak is situated north east of Nilkanth peak. The Alaknanda river originates from below this peak by the melting of these two glaciers at an altitude of 3,641 m (11,946 ft). The two glaciers rise from the eastern slopes of Chaukhamba (7140 m) peak and wrap around the Balakun peak. Balakun is situated north of Kunaling (5471 m) and south of the Arwa Group. The peak was first climbed in 1973 a by six-man team of the Indo-Tibetan Border Police (ITBP) led by Hukum Singh. In 2026 an American team climbed the mountain via the southwest ridge.

== Nearby glaciers ==
- Bhagirathi Kharak glacier
- Satopanth glacier

== Nearby peaks ==
- Nilkantha (6,600 m)
- Chaukhamba (7,140 m)
- Kunaling (5,471 m)
