= Nilkantha (mountain) =

Mountain in Uttarakhand, India

Neelkanth
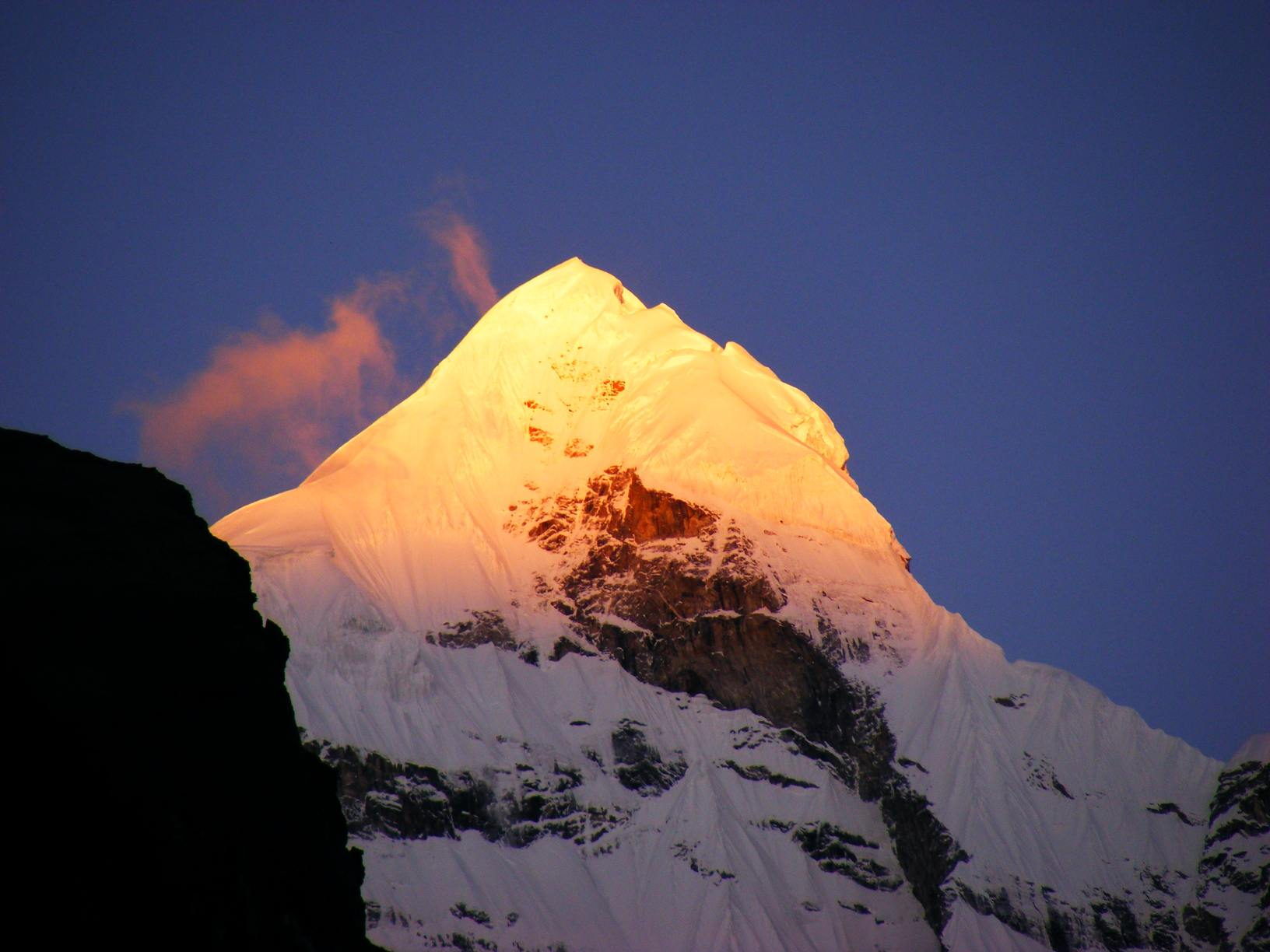

Highest point
- Elevation: 6,596 m (21,640 ft)
- Prominence: 1,200 m (3,900 ft)
- Coordinates: 30°43′12″N 79°24′00″E

Geography
- Location within India
- Location: Uttarakhand, India
- Parent range: Garhwal Himalayas

Climbing
- First ascent: 3 June 1974 by Sonam Pulzor, Kanhiya Lal, Dilip Singh, Nima Dorje

Nilkantha (or Neelakant, Neelkanth, Nilkanth, Nilkanta) is a major peak of the Garhwal division of the Himalayas, in the Uttarakhand region of the Indian state of Uttarakhand. Although substantially lower than the highest peaks of the region, it towers dramatically over the valley of the Alaknanda River and rises 3,474 metres (11,398 ft) above the Hindu pilgrimage site of Badrinath, only 9 km (6 mi) to the east. The so called "Queen of the Garhwal" was described by Frank Smythe as "second only to Siniolchu in Himalayan beauty."

The Satopanth Glacier lies on the northwest side of Nilkantha, below a 2,500 m (8,200 ft) face of the peak. The Panpatia Glacier lies to the southwest, and feeds the Khirao Ganga, a stream running under the south side of the peak. Further away, to the west of the peak, lies the well-known Gangotri Glacier and its associated peaks. Across the Alaknanda valley lie the Kamet and Nanda Devi groups.

== Etymology ==
Nīlakaṇtha (Sanskrit नीलकण्ठ; nīla = "blue", kaṇtha = "throat") is one of the Hindu deity, Shiva's many epithets.

In Hindu mythology a route existed between Kedarnath and Badrinath which allowed the "Purahita", to worship in the temples at those two sites in one day. This continued for a long time until due to some sins of the worshiper, Shiva became displeased with him and stood blocking the way as a huge sky-kissing mountain, which is said to be modern Nilkantha.

== Climbing history ==
With its steep ridges and faces, Nilkantha resisted seven climbing attempts, beginning with Frank Smythe in 1937, and Willi Unsoeld in 1949.

The peak was purportedly first climbed on 13 June 1961, by an expedition led by Col. Narinder Kumar, with Shri O.P. Sharma and Sherpas Lakpa Giyalbu and Phurba Lobsang reaching the summit. They placed their base camp on the Satopanth Glacier and ascended via the north face. Jagdish Nanavati, Honorary Secretary of the Himalayan Club, Bombay, studied the ascent and came to the conclusion that the expedition had gravely underestimated the route and faltered far below the summit in bad weather. Nevertheless, a committee of the Indian Mountaineering Foundation ratified the ascent late in 1963, though they recommended the expedition to be repeated the next year to confirm the terrain and timing.

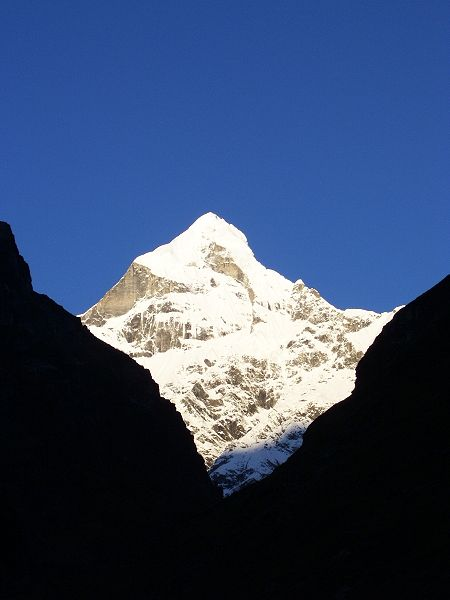
View of Mt. Nilkantha from Badrinath

The generally accepted first ascent was made on 3 June 1974 by Sonam Pulzor, Kanhiya Lal, Dilip Singh, and Nima Dorje of the Indo-Tibetan Border Police. The expedition was led by S. P. Chamoli. After unsuccessfully attempting the west ridge, they reached the summit via the north face, making three camps above base camp.

The second ascent of Nilkantha was only in 1993 by an international team under Col. H.S. Chauhan via the north-east ridge. No fewer than 32 climbers made the summit between 31 May and 2 June.

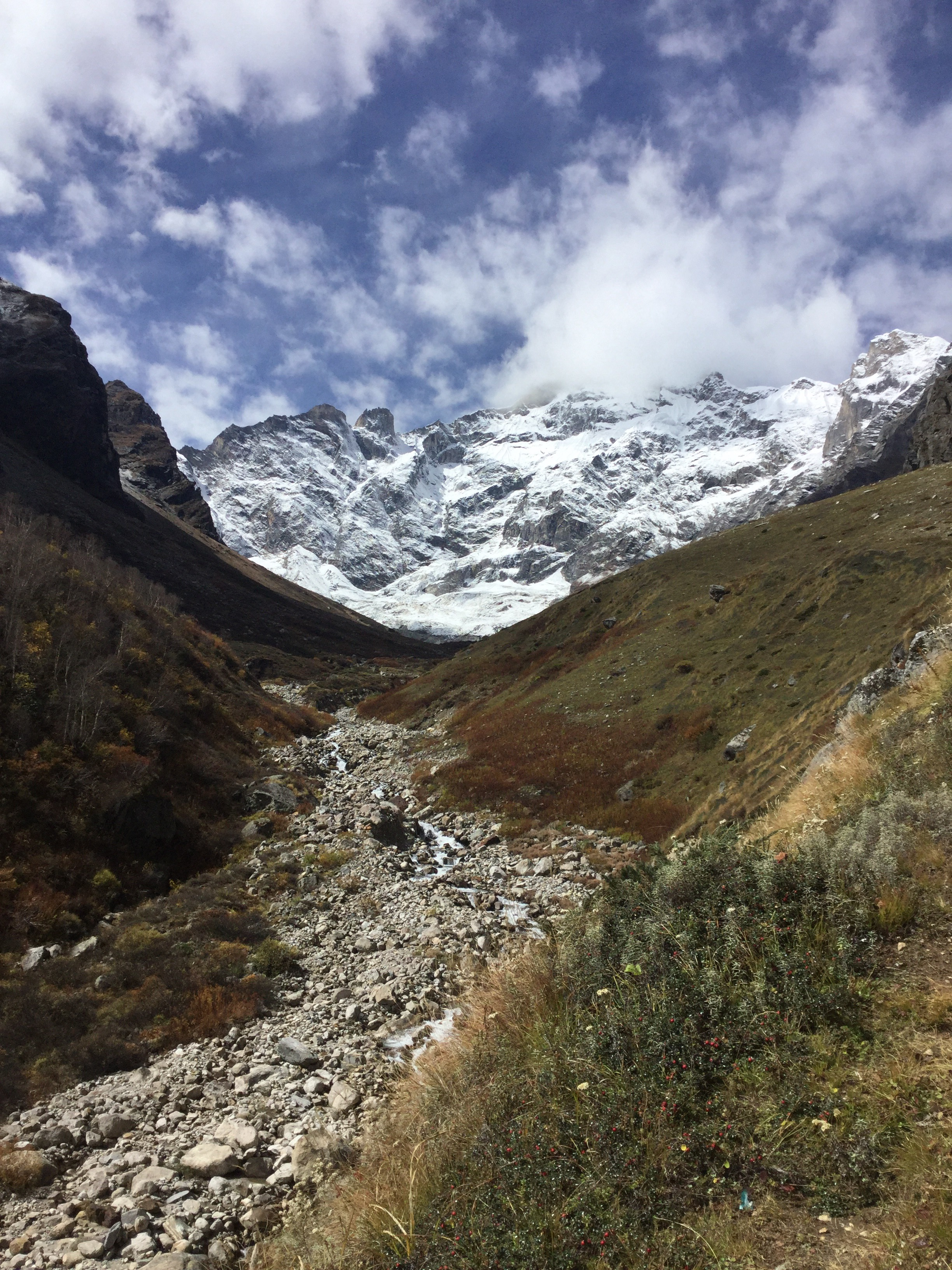
Neelkanth mountain as seen from a valley while trekking from Badrinath to Neelkanth.

In 2000, five British climbers led by Martin Moran made the third ascent and the first ascent over the west ridge. In November 2001, the Slovenian climbers Marko Prezelj and Matic Jost repeated this route. In 2007, the Himalayan Club Calcutta claimed an ascent via the west ridge as well, but their climb was later shown to have stopped about 150 metres below the highest point on the mountain. The Indian Mountaineering Foundation (IMF) has not yet formally rejected the claim.

The leader of the 2007 Himalayan Club Kolkata Section AVM (Retd) Apurva Bhattacharya had made detailed technical representation on their claimed ascent up to the Summit ridge of Nilkanth. An Internal Authentication committee was set up by IMF to study the contention of the 2007 team. On detailed analysis, the authentication committee concluded that the 2007 team had indeed reached the summit ridge of Nilkanth and deemed this expedition to be successful. Communication to this end was made by IMF to the Expedition leader vide letter dated 6 August 2014.
