= Badrinath =

- Town
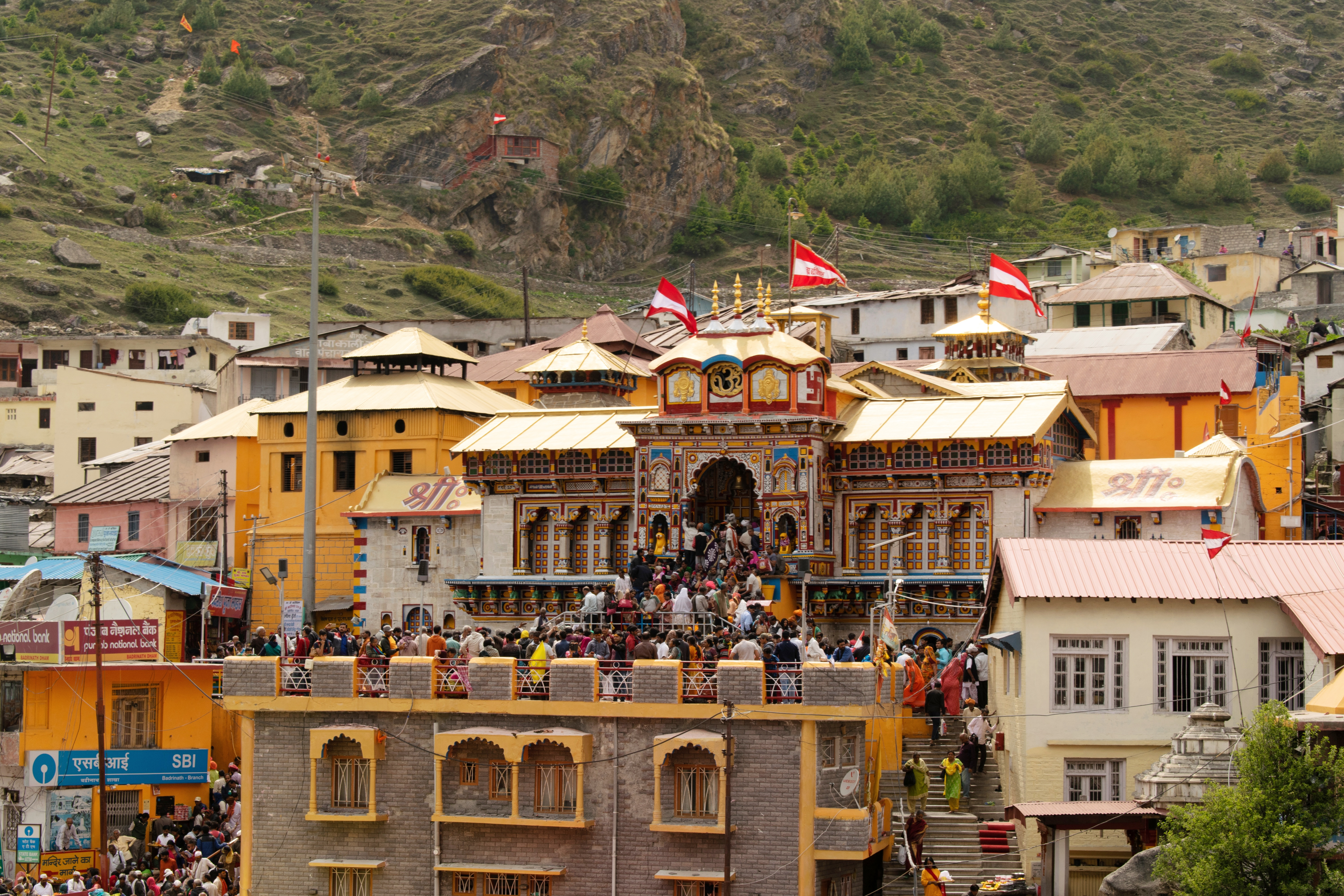

- Location in Uttarakhand, India Badrinath (India)
- Coordinates: 30.744°N 79.493°E
- Country: India
- State: Uttarakhand
- District: Chamoli

Area
  - Total: 3 km^{2} (1.2 sq mi)
- Elevation: 3,300 m (10,800 ft)

Population (2011)
  - Total: 2,438
  - Density: 810/km^{2} (2,100/sq mi)

Languages
  - Official: Hindi
  - Additional official: Sanskrit
  - Regional: Rongpo (Marcha)
- Time zone: UTC+5:30 (IST)
- PIN: 246422
- Vehicle registration: UK 11
- Website: badrinath-kedarnath.gov.in

Char Dham

Badrinath is a town and nagar panchayat in Chamoli district in the state of Uttarakhand, India. It is a Hindu holy place, and is one of the four sites in India's Char Dham pilgrimage. It is also part of India's Chota Char Dham pilgrimage circuit and gets its name from the Badrinath Temple.

== Etymology ==
Badrinath derives from the Sanskrit compound Badarīnātha, consisting of the terms badarī (jujube tree) and nātha (lord), an epithet of Vishnu. It is also known as Badarikashrama.

== History ==
In earlier days, pilgrims used to walk hundreds of miles to visit the Badrinath temple. The temple has been repeatedly destroyed by earthquakes and avalanches. As late as the First World War, the town consisted only of the 20-odd huts used by the temple's staff, but the site drew thousands each year and up to 50,000 on its duodecennial festivals (every twelve years). In recent years its popularity has increased still more, with an estimated 600,000 pilgrims visiting during the 2006 season, compared to 90,676 in 1961. The temple in Badrinath is also a sacred pilgrimage site for Vaishnavites. Badrinath is also gateway to several mountaineering expeditions headed to mountains like Nilkantha.

== Temple ==
The Badrinath temple is the main attraction in the town. According to the legend, Adi Shankaracharya discovered a black stone image of Lord Badrinarayan made of Shaligram stone in the Alaknanda River. He originally enshrined it in a cave near the Tapt Kund hot springs. In the sixteenth century, the King of Garhwal moved the murti to the present temple. The temple is approximately 50 ft (15 m) tall with a small cupola on top, covered with a gold gilt roof. The facade is built of stone, with arched windows. A broad stairway leads up to a tall arched gateway, which is the main entrance. The architecture resembles a Buddhist vihara (temple), with the brightly painted facade also more typical of Buddhist temples. Just inside is the mandapa, a large pillared hall that leads to the garbha grha, or main shrine area. The walls and pillars of the mandapa are covered with intricate carving.

== Legend ==
According to the Bhagavata Purana, "There in Badrikashram, the supreme being (Vishnu), in his incarnation as the sages Nara and Narayana, had been undergoing great penance since time immemorial for the welfare of all living entities" (Bhagavata Purana 3.4.22).

The Badrinath area is referred to as Badari or Badarikaashram (बदरिकाश्रम) in Hindu scriptures. It is a place sacred to Vishnu, particularly in Vishnu's dual form of Nara-Narayana. Thus, in the Mahabharata, Krishna, addressing Arjuna, says, "Thou wast Nara in a former body, and, with Narayana for thy companion, didst perform dreadful austerity at Badari for many myriads of years."

As per one legend, when the goddess Ganga was requested to descend on earth to help the suffering humanity at the request of Bhagiratha, the earth was unable to withstand the force of her descent. Therefore, the mighty Ganga (Ganges) was split into two holy channels, with Alaknanda as one of them.

Another lore states that the area was full of Badari, a wild berry. Vishnu meditated here and Lakshmi took the form of the Badari tree to provide shade for him from scorching sun.

The mountains around Badrinath are mentioned in the Mahabharata, when the Pandavas were said to have died one by one, when ascending the slopes of a peak in western Garhwal called Swargarohini (literal meaning - the 'Ascent to Heaven'). The Pandavas passed through Badrinath and the town of Mana, 4 km north of Badrinath, on their way to Svarga (heaven). There is also a cave in Mana where Vyasa, according to the legend, wrote the Mahabharata.

The area around Badrinath was celebrated in Padma Purana as abounding in spiritual treasures.

This place is considered holy in Jainism as well. In Jainism, Himalaya is also called Ashtapad because of its eight different mountain range Gaurishankar, Kailash, Badrinath, Nanda, Drongiri, Nara-Narayana and Trishuli. Rishabhanatha attained Nirvana on Mount Kailash situated in the Himalayan range and according to Jain faith (Nirvankand), from Badrinath numerous Jain Muni got Moksha by doing Tapsya. According to Shrimadbhagwat, at this place Rishabhdev's father Nabhirai and mother Marudevi had done hard Tapa after Rishabhdev's Rajyabhishek and taken Samadhi. Even today footprint of Nabhirai at Neelkanth mountain attracts everybody towards him.

== Geography ==
Badrinath has an average elevation of 3,100 metres (10,170 feet). It is in the Garhwal Himalayas, on the banks of the Alaknanda River. The town lies between the Nar and Narayana mountain ranges 9 km east of Nilkantha peak (6,596m). Badrinath is located 62 km northwest of Nanda Devi peak and 301 km north of Rishikesh. From Gaurikund (near Kedarnath) to Badrinath by road is 233 km.

According to the Köppen climate system, Badrinath's climate is humid continental (Dfb) bordering a subtropical highland climate (Cfb).

Climate data for Badrinath, Uttarakhand
Month	Jan	Feb	Mar	Apr	May	Jun	Jul	Aug	Sep	Oct	Nov	Dec	Year
Mean daily maximum °C (°F)	4.3 (39.7)	6.0 (42.8)	10.0 (50.0)	15.0 (59.0)	18.6 (65.5)	20.4 (68.7)	19.1 (66.4)	18.6 (65.5)	17.1 (62.8)	13.7 (56.7)	9.7 (49.5)	6.5 (43.7)	13.2 (55.9)
Daily mean °C (°F)	−0.3 (31.5)	1.2 (34.2)	5.0 (41.0)	9.3 (48.7)	12.6 (54.7)	15.0 (59.0)	14.9 (58.8)	14.7 (58.5)	12.6 (54.7)	8.3 (46.9)	4.5 (40.1)	1.5 (34.7)	8.3 (46.9)
Mean daily minimum °C (°F)	−4.9 (23.2)	−4.6 (23.7)	0.0 (32.0)	3.6 (38.5)	6.7 (44.1)	9.6 (49.3)	10.8 (51.4)	10.8 (51.4)	8.1 (46.6)	3.0 (37.4)	−0.6 (30.9)	−3.4 (25.9)	3.3 (37.9)
Average precipitation mm (inches)	145.0 (5.71)	139.0 (5.47)	163.0 (6.42)	77.0 (3.03)	54.0 (2.13)	102.0 (4.02)	325.0 (12.80)	312.0 (12.28)	188.0 (7.40)	63.0 (2.48)	45.0 (1.77)	67.0 (2.64)	1,680 (66.15)

== Demographics ==
As of 2011 Indian Census, Badrinath had a total population of 2,438, of which 2,054 were males and 384 were females. Population within the age group of 0 to 6 years was 68. The total number of literates in Badrinath was 2,265, which constituted 92.9% of the population with male literacy of 95.4% and female literacy of 79.7%. The effective literacy rate of 7+ population of Badrinath was 95.6%, of which male literacy rate was 97.1% and female literacy rate was 86.9%. The Scheduled Castes and Scheduled Tribes population was 113 and 22 respectively. Badrinath had 850 households in 2011.

== Gallery ==
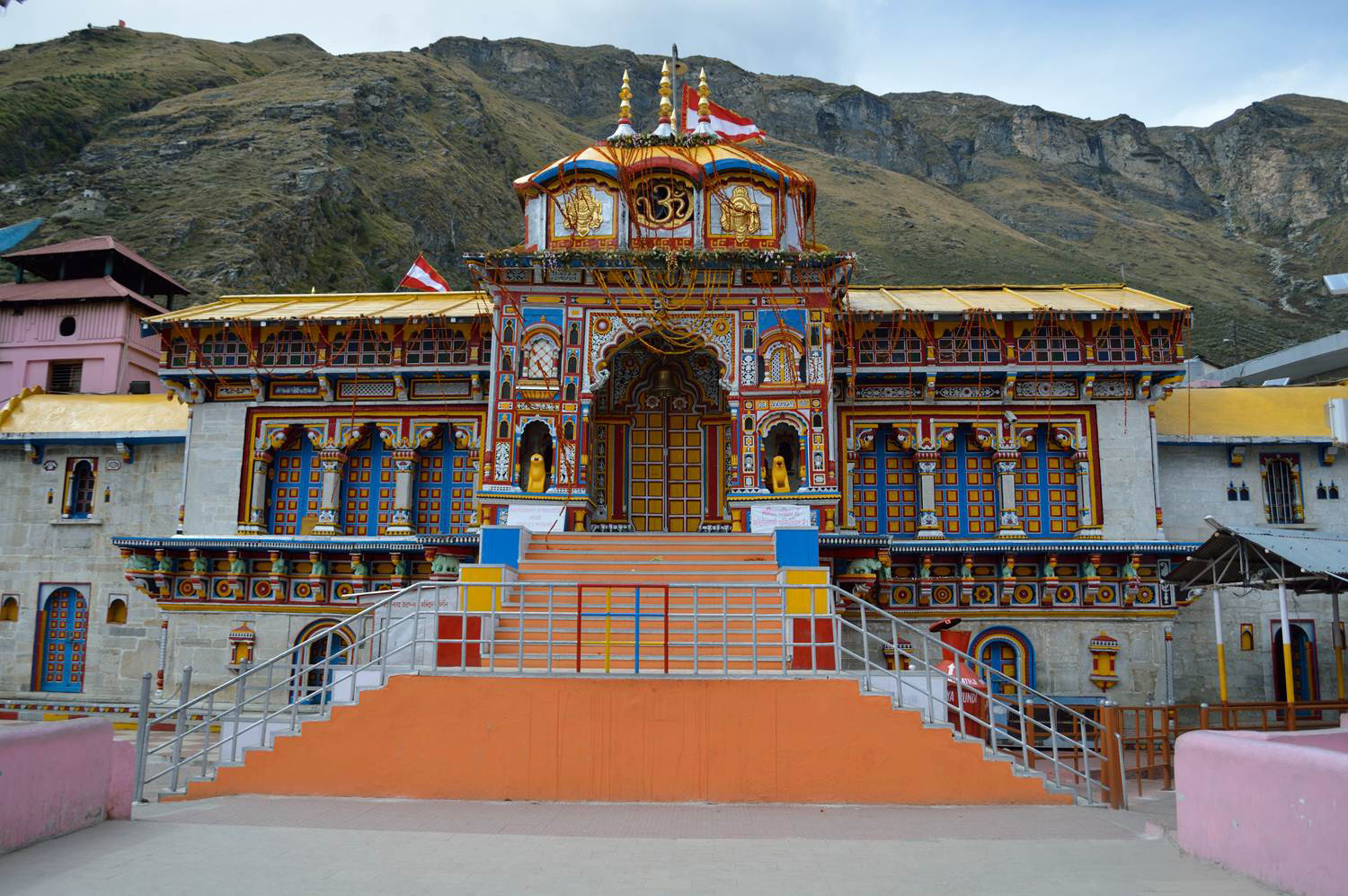
Badrinath is one of the most popular and religious holy towns of the Hindus located at Chamoli district of Uttarakhand in India

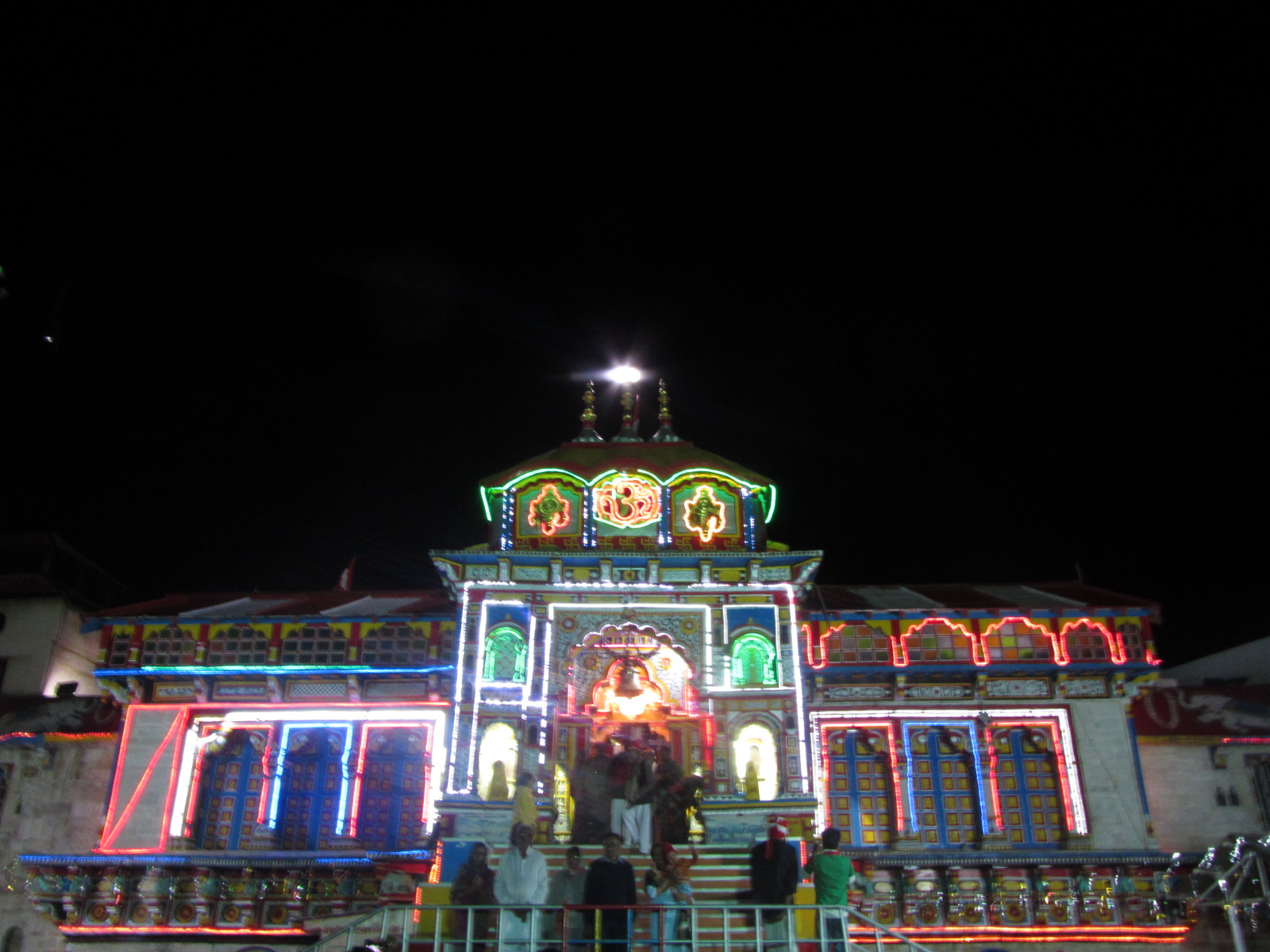
Badrinath temple at night

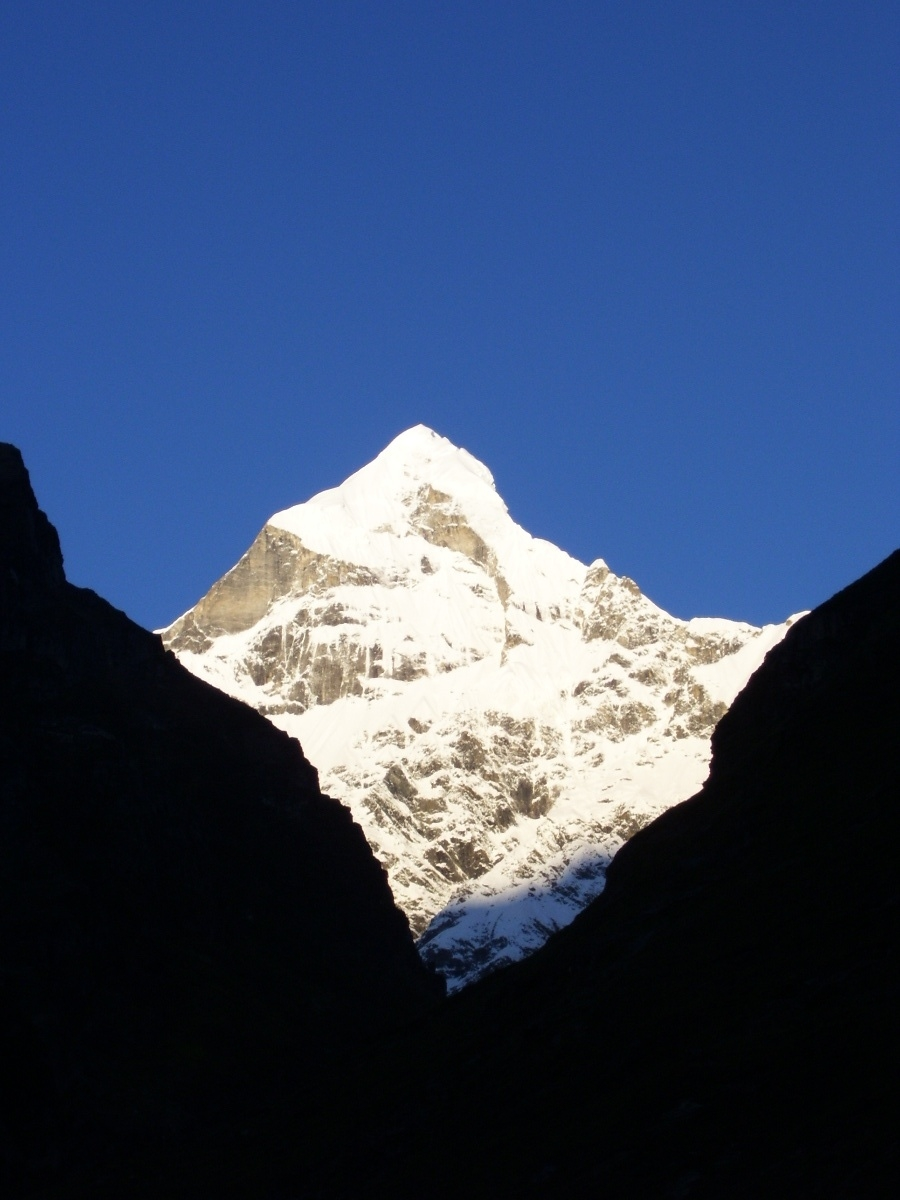
Neelkanth Parbat from Badrinath

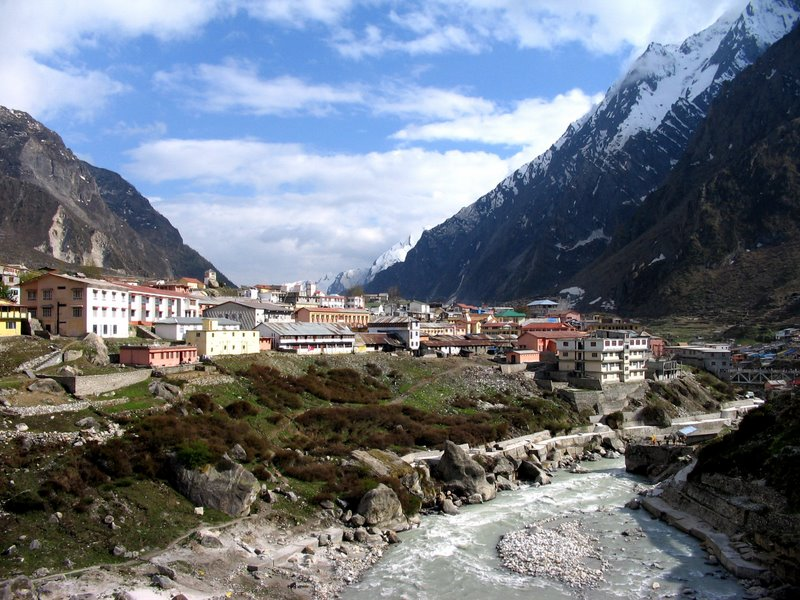
Badrinath Town

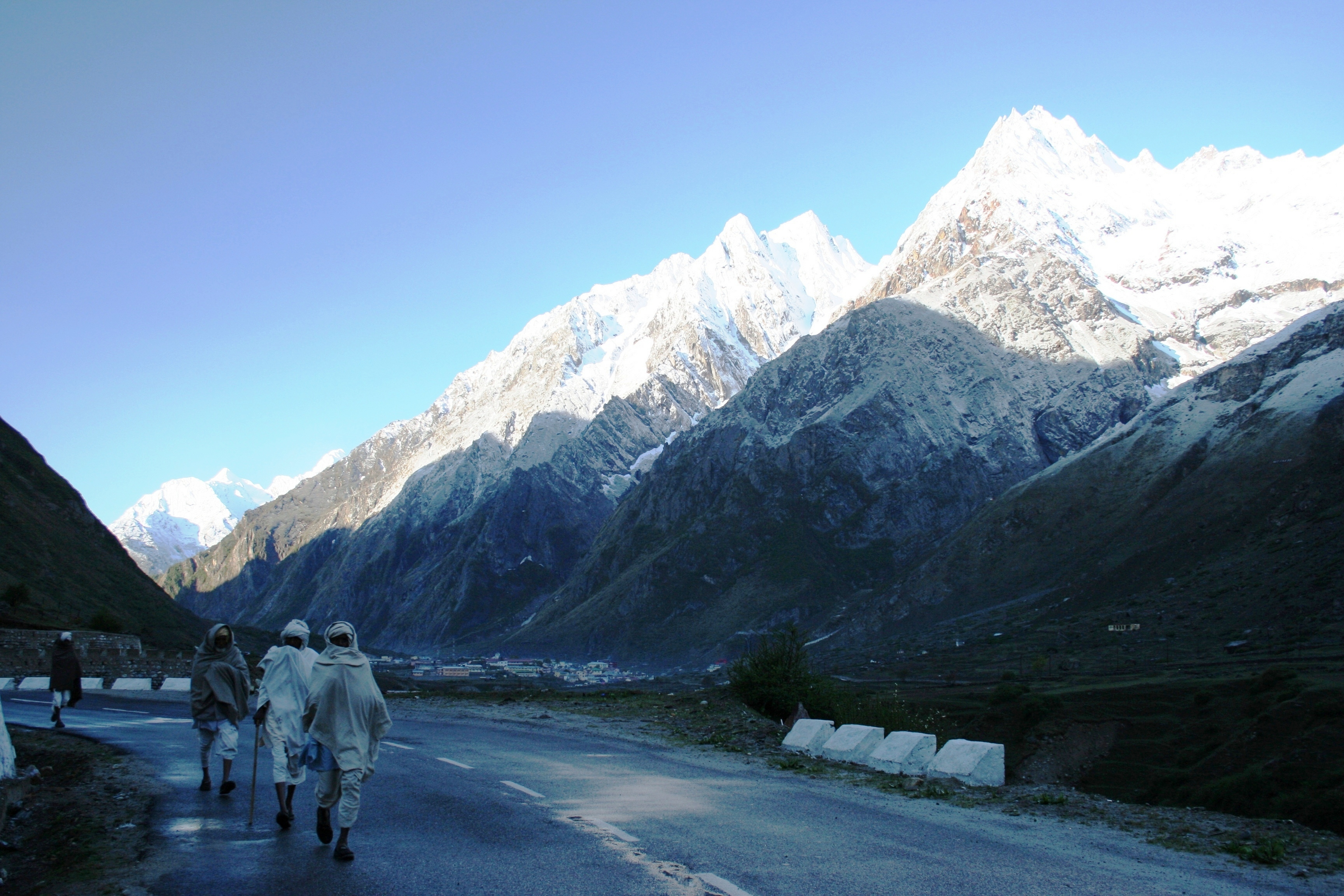
Himalayas in Badrinath, Uttarakhand

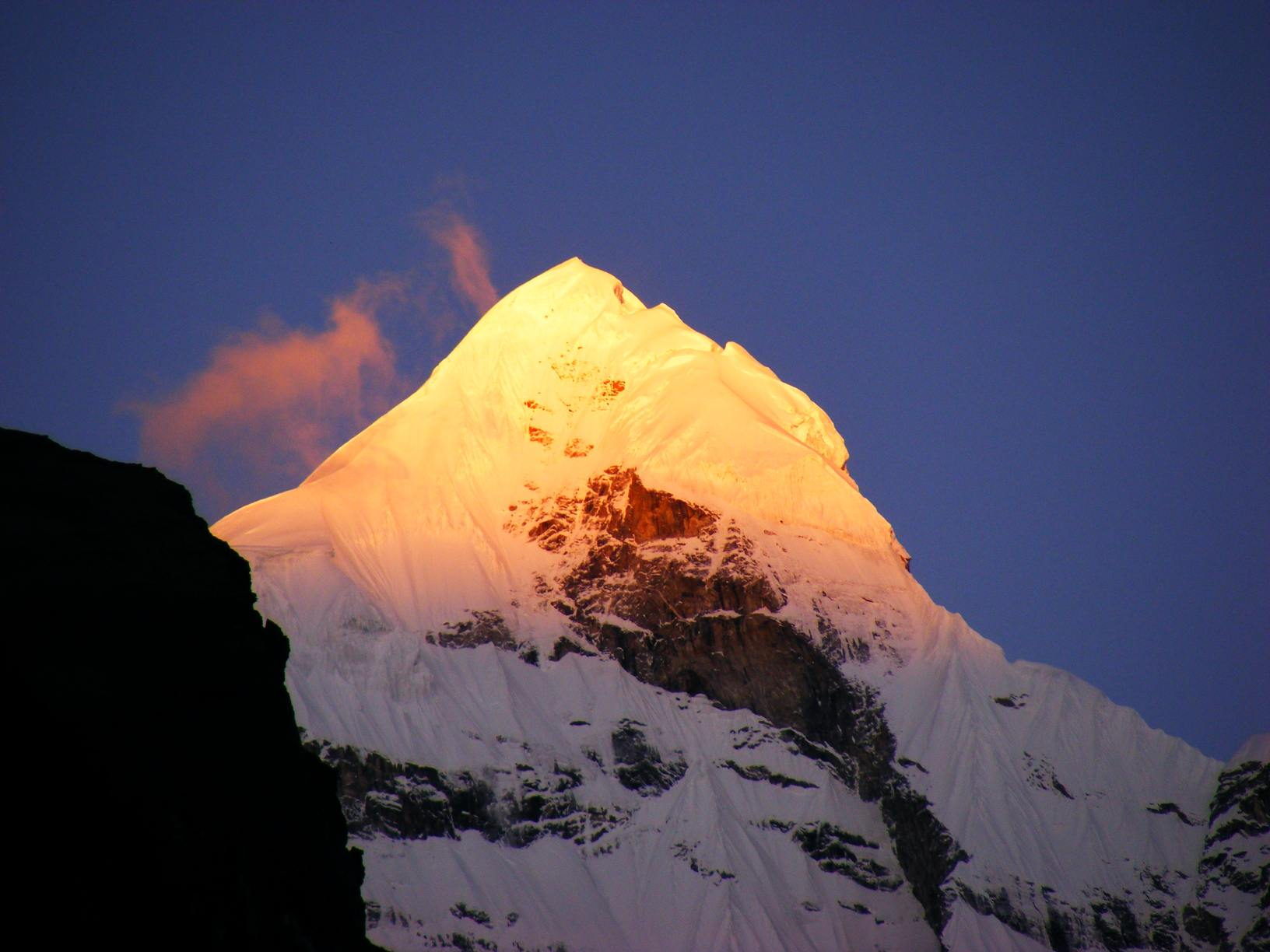
View from Badrinath

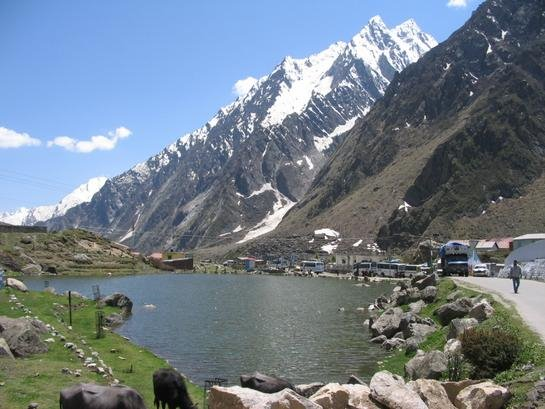
Sheeshtaal (Sheshnaag lake)

== See also ==
- Badri Narayanan temple
- Vasudhara Falls
