= Sapta Badri =

Group of seven Hindu temples of Vishnu in Uttarakhand, India

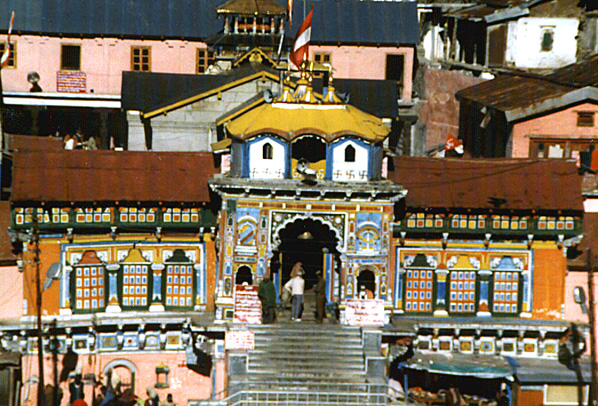
- Badrinath temple, chief of the Sapta Badri

Religion
- Affiliation: Hinduism
- Deity: Vishnu

Location
- State: Uttarakhand
- Country: India
- Interactive map of Sapta Badri
- Coordinates: 30°44′40.9″N 79°25′22.49″E

Architecture
- Type: North Indian architecture
- Creator: Adi Shankaracharya
- Completed: Unknown

Sapta Badri constitutes a group of seven sacred Hindu temples, dedicated to god Vishnu, located in Garhwal Himalayas in the Indian state of Uttarakhand. The Badrinath temple, called the Badri Vishal (altitude 3,133 m (10,279 ft)) is the primary temple among the seven shrines. The other six being Adi Badri, Bhavishya Badri, Yogadhayan Badri, Vriddha Badri, Ardha Badri and Dhyan Badri. The Panch Badri temple circuit consisted of only five temples, omitting Ardha Badri and usually Dhyan Badri (or sometimes Vriddha Badri). Rarely, Narasingh Badri, is included in the Sapta Badri or Panch Badri list.

The abode of Vishnu in the Alaknanda river valley, starting from Satapanth about 24 kilometres (15 mi) above Badrinath extending up to Nandprayag in the south, is particularly known as the Badri Kshetra in which all the Badri temples are located. Since the early times, approach to the main temple of Badrinath was only along a bridle path passing through badri van or (forest of berries). Thus, the word "Badri", meaning "berries", is suffixed to the names of all the Sapta Badri (seven) temples.

The main shrine of Badrinath is well connected by road and air but is closed during the winter season due to snow conditions, from October–November to April–May depending on the astrological dates fixed by the Temple Committee; the Raj Purohit (Royal priest) decides the auspicious day for opening the temple kapat (doors) on Vasant Panchami day in end of April/early May while the closing day is Vijayadashami day in October/November. The other six temples are located in villages, largely in remote locations. A few of them can be approached only by trekking along bridle paths.

== Badrinath ==
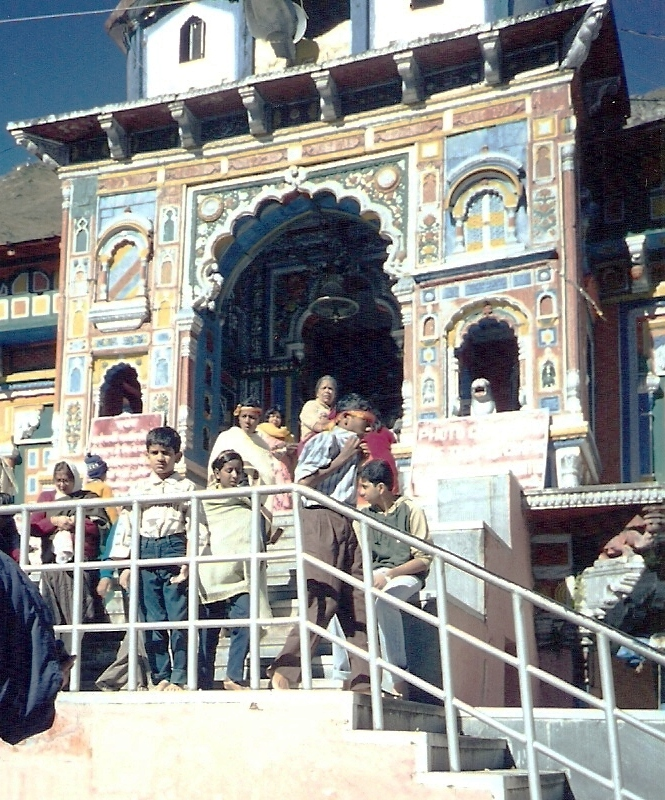
Badrivishal of Sapta Badri

Badrinath is the northern Dham of the four sacred Dhams (pilgrimage centres) called Char Dham. Though the Badrinath temple is believed to date to the Vedic period, the current structure was built in the 8th century AD by Adi Shankaracharya. The other three dhams are Rameshwaram in the south, Dwarka in the west and Jagannath Puri in the east; all of them are dedicated to lord Vishnu except Rameshwaram which is dedicated to lord Shiva. Adi Shankara's basic intention was to unite the country under the banner of Hinduism. The temple, which had been subjected to damage due to snow avalanches and landslides, several times in the past, was last restored in the 19th century with the royal patronage of the Scindias and Holkars. Badrinath is also part of Chota Char Dham, four sacred temples in Uttarakhand. The others include the Shiva temple of Kedarnath and the sources of the holy rivers Ganges and Yamuna.

The Badrinath legend states that Vishnu (Mahavishnu) in his incarnation as the sages Nara and Narayana, did penance in an open space at the location of the Badrikashram or Badrinath. His consort Lakshmi (Maha-lakshmi) created shelter for him in the form of Badri tree (berry tree) to protect him from adverse climatic conditions. The sage Narada did penance here, and is believed to continue to do so to this day by reciting the divine chants called Ashta Akshara mantras (eight lettered mantra, i.e., Om Namo Narayanaya). Narada was also informed by Vishnu that his divine form subsumed both Nara and Narayana.

According to the scripture Bhagavata Purana, "There in Badrikashram (Badrinath) the Personality of Godhead (Vishnu), in his incarnation as the sages Nara and Narayana, had been undergoing great penance since time immemorial for the welfare of all living entities." (3.4.22)

The layout of the temple has three enclosures namely, the Garbhagriha (Sanctum Sanctorum), the Darshan Mandap (worship hall) and Sabha Mandap (Conference hall). The sanctum holds the central image of Badri-narayana (Vishnu), which is made in black stone and 1 metre (3.3 ft) in height. The four-armed Vishnu holds the Shankh (Conch) and Sudarshana Chakra (discus) in two arms in a raised posture and the other two arms rest on the lap in Yogamudra (meditative pose). The images of religious leaders Adi Shankara, Swami Vedanta Desikan and Ramanujacharya are also worshipped here.

In the sanctum, to the far right side are Nara and Narayana. Narada is kneeling in front on the right side and is difficult to see. On the left side is Kubera, the god of wealth. Garuda, Vishnu's vehicle is kneeling in front, to the left of Badri-narayana. Wings at the entrance are adorned with images of Hanuman, and a silver Ganesha, god of wisdom. In the enclosure (prakara) surrounding the temple, a small shrine is dedicated to Lakshmi, Vishnu's consort. Nambudiri Brahmins from southern state of Kerala serve as head priests here.

== Adi Badri ==
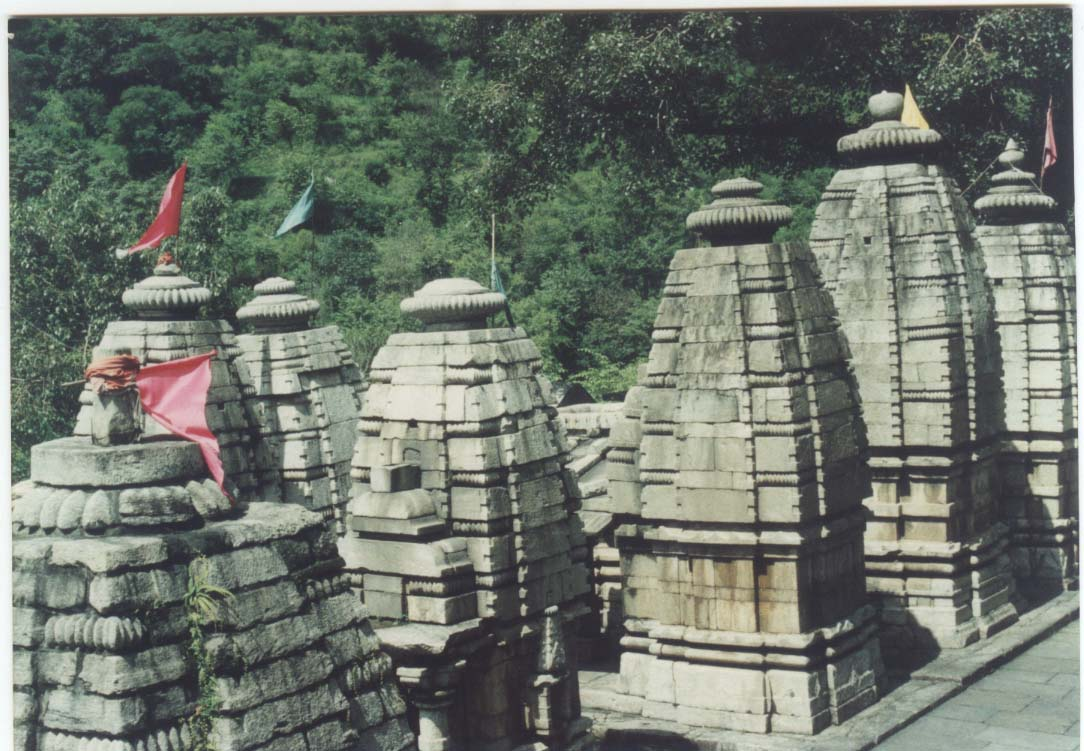
Adi Badri complex of temples near Karnaprayag

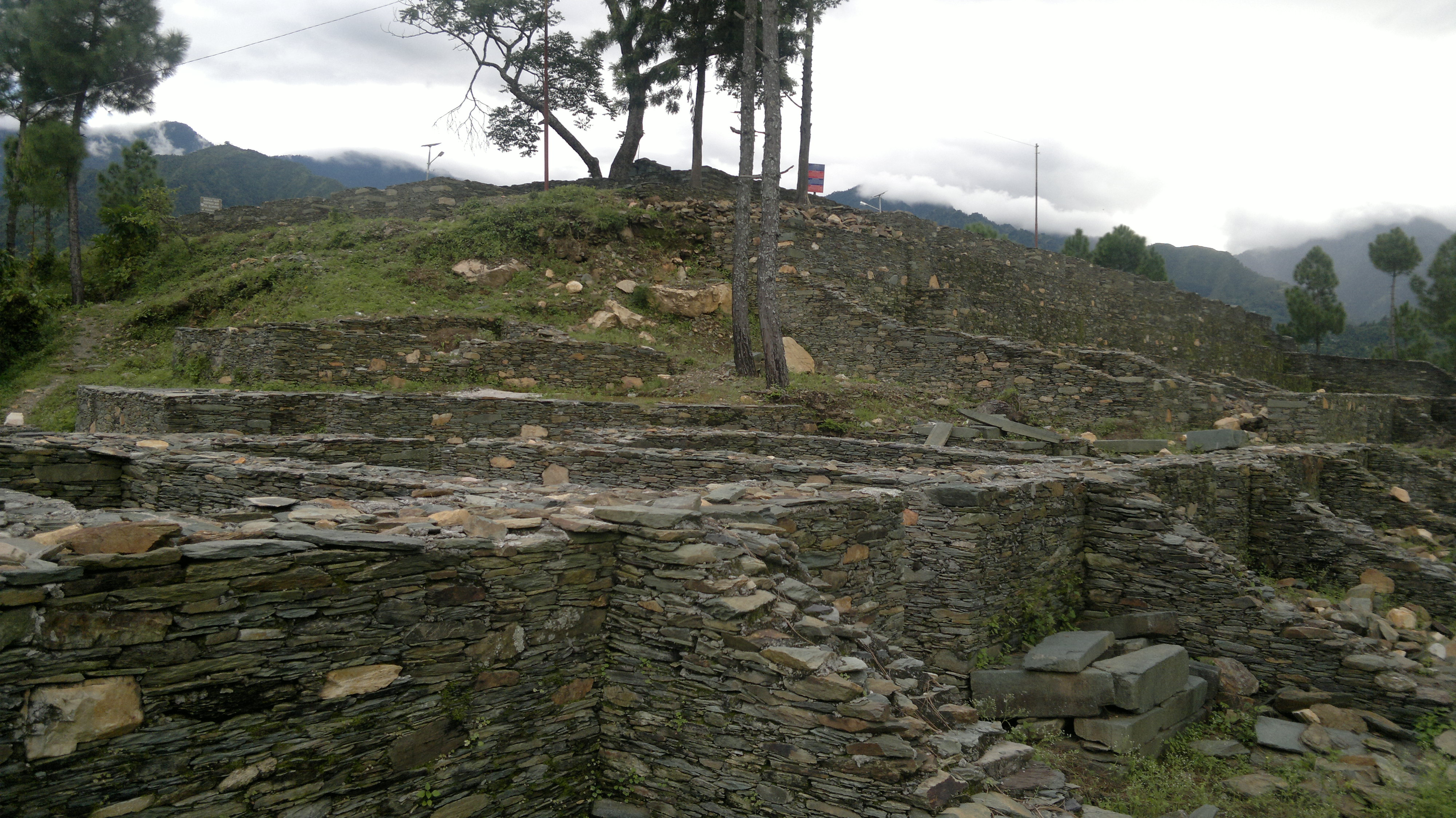
Chandpur Garhi Fort, temple is 3km from it.

The Adi Badri (30°27′27″N 77°20′28″E) the first temple complex among the Sapta Badri temples is an ancient shrine dedicated to Vishnu and is one among a chain of 16 small shrines located in the hill ranges 17 kilometres (11 mi), beyond Karnaprayag (confluence of Pindar River and Alaknanda River in Chamoli district. Seven temples of this chain were built during the late Gupta period (5th century to 8th century). According to tradition, Adi Shankara is attributed as builder of all the temples. Adi Shankara is believed to have sanctioned these temples in order to spread Hinduism to every remote part of the country. In ancient times, when approach to the main shrine of Badrinath was closed due to weather conditions, pilgrims worshipped Vishnu at this temple. Adi Badri, also known as Helisera according to revenue records, is a tiny temple complex enclosed within a space of 14 metres (46 ft) X 30 metres (98 ft). The height of the temples vary from 2–6 metres (6.6–19.7 ft). The chief temple is dedicated to god Vishnu, which is built over a raised platform, with a small enclosure in a pyramidal form. The sanctum holds black stone 1 metre (3.3 ft) image of Vishnu. The image depicts Vishnu holding a mace, lotus and chakra (discus). Brahmins from South India serve as chief priests in the temple.

Adi Badri is located 3 kilometres (1.9 mi) from Chandpur fort or Garhi located on the hilltop, which was built by the Parmar kings of garhwal. Adi Badri is an hour's drive from Karnaprayag and close to Chulakot on the way to Ranikhet. On shifting of Badrinath (also known as Raj Badri) to Bhavishya Badri, Adi Badri will be called the Yog Badri.

== Vriddha Badri ==
Vriddha Badri or Briddha Badri - an austere shrine, is located in the Animath village ( 1,380 m (4,530 ft), above sea level) 7 km (4.3 mi), from Joshimath on the Rishikesh–Joshimath-Badrinath road. The Vriddha Badri legend says that Vishnu appeared in the form of a Vriddha or old man before sage Narada who performed penance here. Thus, the idol installed at this temple is in the form of an old man.

According to legend, the image of Badrinath was carved by the divine craftsman Vishwakarma and worshipped here. At the advent of Kali Yuga, Vishnu chose to remove himself from this place, later Adi Shankara found the partly damaged image in Narad-kund pond and established it at the central Badrinath shrine. According to legend, Badrinath was worshipped here by Adi Shankara, before his enshrinement at the Badrinath temple. The temple is open throughout the year. Brahmins from South India serve as chief priests in the temple.

== Bhavishya Badri ==
Bhavishya Badri, also spelt as Bhabisya Badri, 2,744 metres (9,003 ft), above sea level) is located in a village called Subhain at a distance of 17 kilometres (11 mi) from Joshimath, beyond Tapovan and approach is through dense forest, only by trekking. It is situated on an ancient pilgrim route to Mount Kailash and Manasarovar, along the Dhauli Ganges River. It is situated on the way from Tapovan to Lata in the Niti Valley. Bhavishya Badri is connected by a motorable road to Saldhar,19 kilometres (12 mi), from Joshimath, beyond which a 6 kilometres (3.7 mi) trek is undertaken to reach the shrine.

According to the legend of Bhavishya Badri (literally "Badri of the future"), when evil transcends the world, the mountains of Nara and Narayana would block up the route to Badrinath and the sacred shrine would become inaccessible. The present world will be destroyed and a new one established. Then, Badrinath will appear at the Bhavishya Badri temple and be worshipped here, instead of the Badrinath shrine. The shrine of Narasingh Badri at Joshimath is closely associated with the legend of Bhavishya Badri (see section below). Currently, the Bhavishya Badri has an image of Narasimha, the lion-faced incarnation and one of the ten avatars of Vishnu.

== Yogadhyan Badri ==
Yogadhyan Badri, also called Yoga Badri, is located at Pandukeshwar (30°38′2″N 79°32′51″E) at the elevation of 1,829 metres (6,001 ft), close to Govind Ghat and is as ancient as the main Badrinath temple. Pandukeshwar is located on route from Govind Ghat to Hanuman Chatti, 9 kilometres (5.6 mi) away from Hanuman Chatti. Legend has it that King Pandu, father of the five Pandavas - heroes of the Hindu epic Mahabharata, meditated here to god Vishnu to cleanse him of the sin of killing of two mating deer, who were ascetics in their previous lives. The Pandavas were also born here and Pandu died and attained salvation here. Pandu is believed to have installed the bronze image of Vishnu in the Yogadhyan Badri shrine. The image is in a meditative posture and thus the image is called Yoga-dhyan (mediative) Badri. The idol is life size and has been carved from Shaligram stone. According to legend, the Pandavas, after defeating and killing their cousins Kauravas in the Mahabharata War, came here to repent. They handed their kingdom of Hastinapur to their grandson Parikshit and went to perform penance in the Himalayas.

Copper plate inscriptions found here indicate rule by early Katyuri Rajas and the region was known as Panchal Desh, now officially designated as Uttarakhand. One inscription extols the grant of land given by King Nimbarana. Another historic location is the Suryakund, on top of Milam glacier, which is a hot water spring, where Kunti - mother of Pandavas gave birth to her illegitimate son Karna, fathered by the sun-god Surya. Kunti was married to Pandu at Pandukeshwar.

Yogdhyan Badri is also considered the winter abode for the Utsava-murti (festival-image) of Badrinath, when the temple of Badrinath is closed. Hence, it is religiously ordained that a pilgrimage will not be complete without offering prayers at this place. Bhatts (priests) from South India serve as chief priests in the temple.

== Dhyan Badri ==
Dhyan Badri (2,135 metres (7,005 ft), above sea level) is located in the Urgam valley, close to Kalpeshwar (30°25′44″N 79°25′37″E) on the banks of river Kalpa Ganga. It can be reached from Helang Chatti which is situated on the NH7 (Chamoli - Joshimath road) & then further drive down to Urgam, Lyari & Devagram followed by a 3 kilometres (1.9 mi) trek. The legend of Dhyan Badri (meditating Badri) is linked to the Urvarishi, son of King Puranjaya of the Pandavas lineage who meditated in the Urgam region and established the temple for Vishnu. The image of Vishnu is four-armed, made of black stone and in a meditative posture. There is also a temple to god Shiva built by Adi Shankara. Kalpeshwar, one of the Panch Kedar sacred temple of Shiva, is situated 2 kilometres (1.2 mi), away. The temple is sometimes included in the Panch-Badri list. Brahmins from South India serve as head priests in the temple.

== Narsingh Badri ==
The existing temple of Narasimha (Narsingh) at Joshimath (30°33′3″N 79°33′30″E), also called as Narsingh Badri or Narasimha Badri, is closely linked to the Bhavishya Badri legend, even though usually it is regarded as not one of the famous Panch Badri or Sapta Badri. Sometimes, it may be included in the Sapta-Badri list instead of Ardha-Badri or Panch-Badri list instead of Dhyan Badri.

The chief image of Narasimha is made out of the Shaligram stone, in the eighth century during the reign of king Lalitaditya Yukta Pida of Kashmir. Some believe the image is self-manifested (swayambhu). The image is 10 inches (25 cm) high and depicts the god sitting in the lotus position.

It is believed that one arm of the image is getting emaciated with time and finally fall off. When the arm disappears, the main shrine of Badrinath will be closed to the world and Lord Badrinath will shift to Bhavishya Badri shrine. With this cataclysmic event, Kali Yuga will end ushering in the Satya Yuga. Then the Badrinath shrine would get re-established. When the chief Badrinath shrine is closed in winter, the priests of Badrinath shift to this temple and continue their worship to Badrinath here. Along with the central Narasimha image, the temple also has an image of Badrinath.

== Access ==
While some shrines are approached by motorable roads, others are approachable from the nearest road head by trekking, on the Rishikesh-Badrinath main State Highway. The nearest airport to the Sapta Badri is Jolly Grant Airport close to Rishikesh, but 25 kilometres (16 mi) to Dehradun. Motorable road distance to the seven shrines from Rishikesh are: to Badrinath - 299 kilometres (186 mi); Yogdhyan Badri-277 km (172 mi), 23 kilometres (14 mi) short of Badrinath; Adi Badri - 200 kilometres (120 mi) up to Karnaprayag and a further deviation on the Ranikhet road for17 kilometres (11 mi) to reach the shrine; Dhyan Badri - 299 kilometres (186 mi) to Badrinath and a further trek of 12 kilometres (7.5 mi) en route to Joshimath; Vriddha Badri - 7 km (4.3 mi) trek from Joshimath; Bhavishya Badri - 280 kilometres (170 mi) up to Siladhar by road and further trek of 6 kilometres (3.7 mi) to the shrine.
