= Adi Badri =

Adi Badri may refer to:

- Adi Badri, Haryana, a forest area and archaeological site in Yamunanagar district, Haryana, India
- Adi Badri, Uttarakhand, a Hindu temple in Garhwal Himalayas, Uttarakhand, India
