= Badrinath Temple =

Hindu temple in Uttarakhand, India

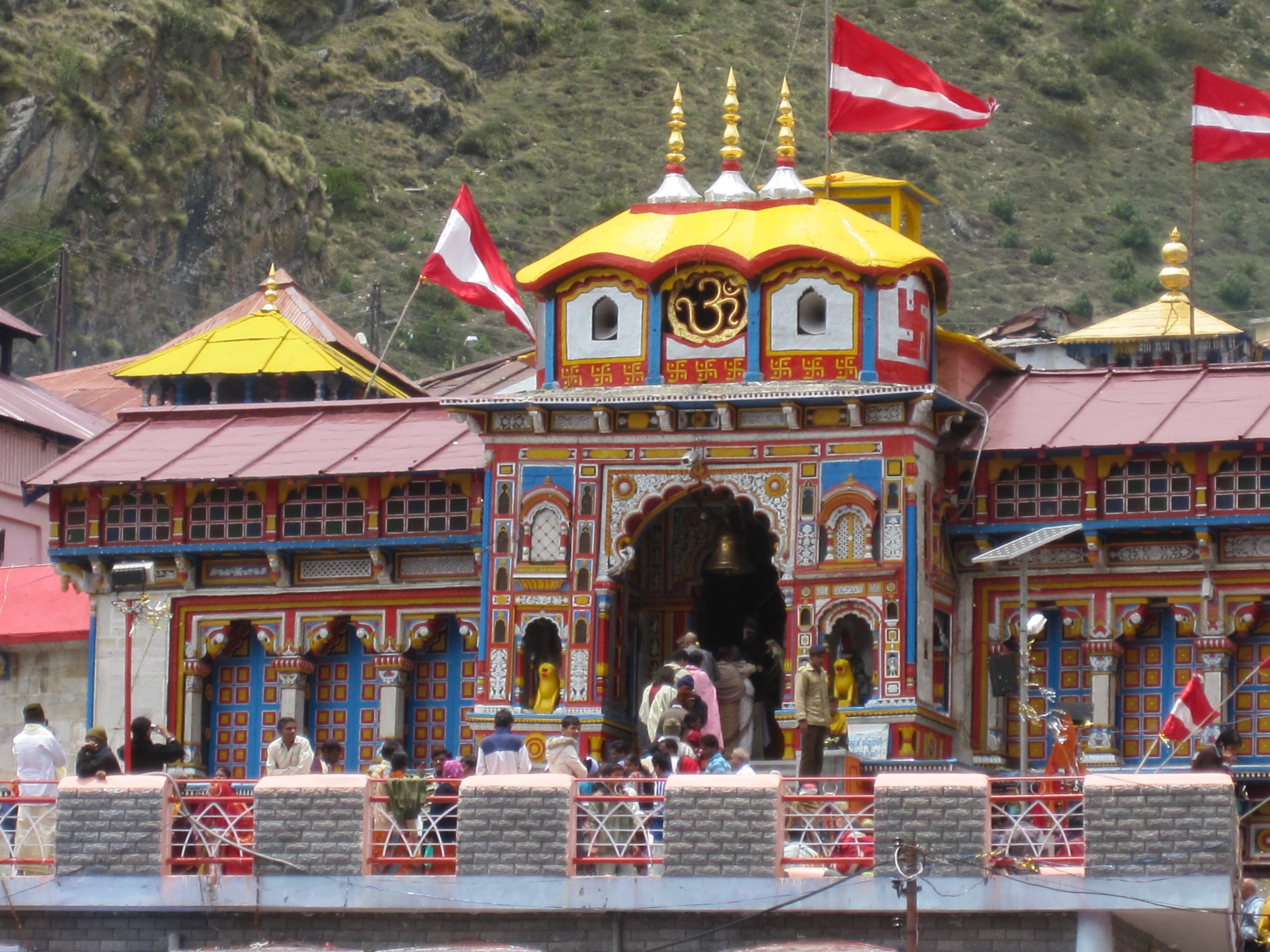
- The temple with steps leading to the entrance

- Location in Uttarakhand

Religion
- Affiliation: Hinduism
- District: Chamoli district
- Deity: Badrinath (Vishnu) and Badridevi (Lakshmi)
- Governing body: Shri Badarinath Kedarnath Temple Committee

Location
- Location: Badrinath
- State: Uttarakhand
- Country: India
- Coordinates: 30.744695°N 79.491175°E

Architecture
- Elevation: 3,100 m (10,171 ft)

Website
- badrinath-kedarnath.gov.in

Badarinath Temple, also known as Badarinarayana Temple, is a Hindu temple dedicated to Vishnu. It is located in the town of Badrinath in Chamoli district of Uttarakhand, India. The temple is one of the 108 Divya Desams, sacred to Vaishnavism, where Vishnu is worshipped as Badrinath. Due to extreme weather conditions in the Himalayas, the temple is open for six months each year, from late April to early November. It is one of the most visited pilgrimage centres of India, having recorded 2.8 million (28 lakh) visits in just 2 months in 2022. It is one of the Char Dham pilgrimage sites.

The image of the presiding deity worshipped in the temple is a 1 ft (0.30 m), the black granite deity of Vishnu in the form of Badrinarayan. The deity is considered by many Hindus to be one of eight svayam vyakta kshetras, or self-manifested deities of Vishnu.

The temple was included in the Uttar Pradesh state government Act No. 30/1948 as Act no. 16,1939, which later came to be known as "Shri Badarinath and Shri Kedarnath Mandir Act". The committee nominated by the state government administers both the temples and has seventeen members on its board.

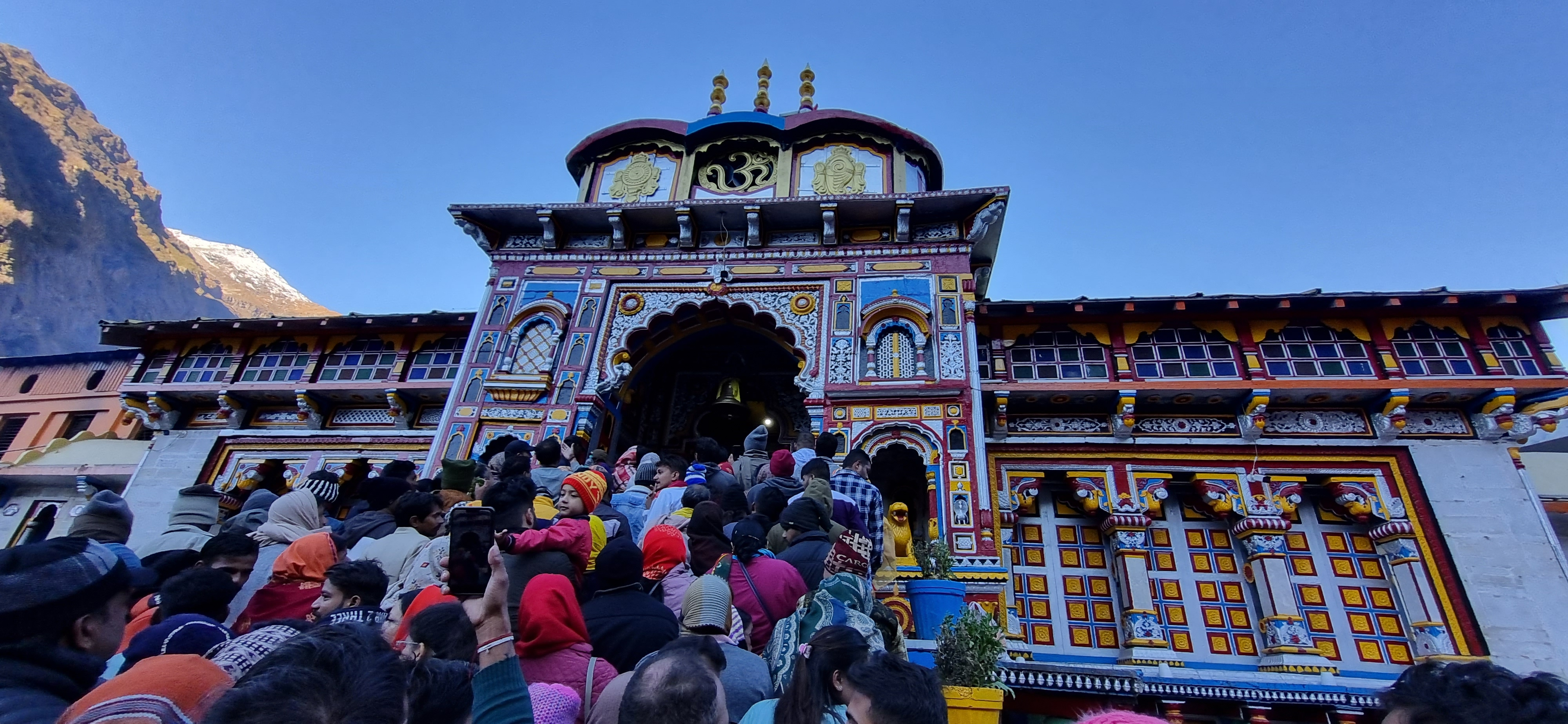
Devotees at the Badrinath Temple in October 2022

The temple is mentioned in ancient religious texts like Vishnu Purana and Skanda Purana. It is glorified in the Naalayira Divya Prabandham, an early medieval Tamil canon of the Alvar saints from the 6th–9th centuries CE.

== Location, architecture, and shrines ==
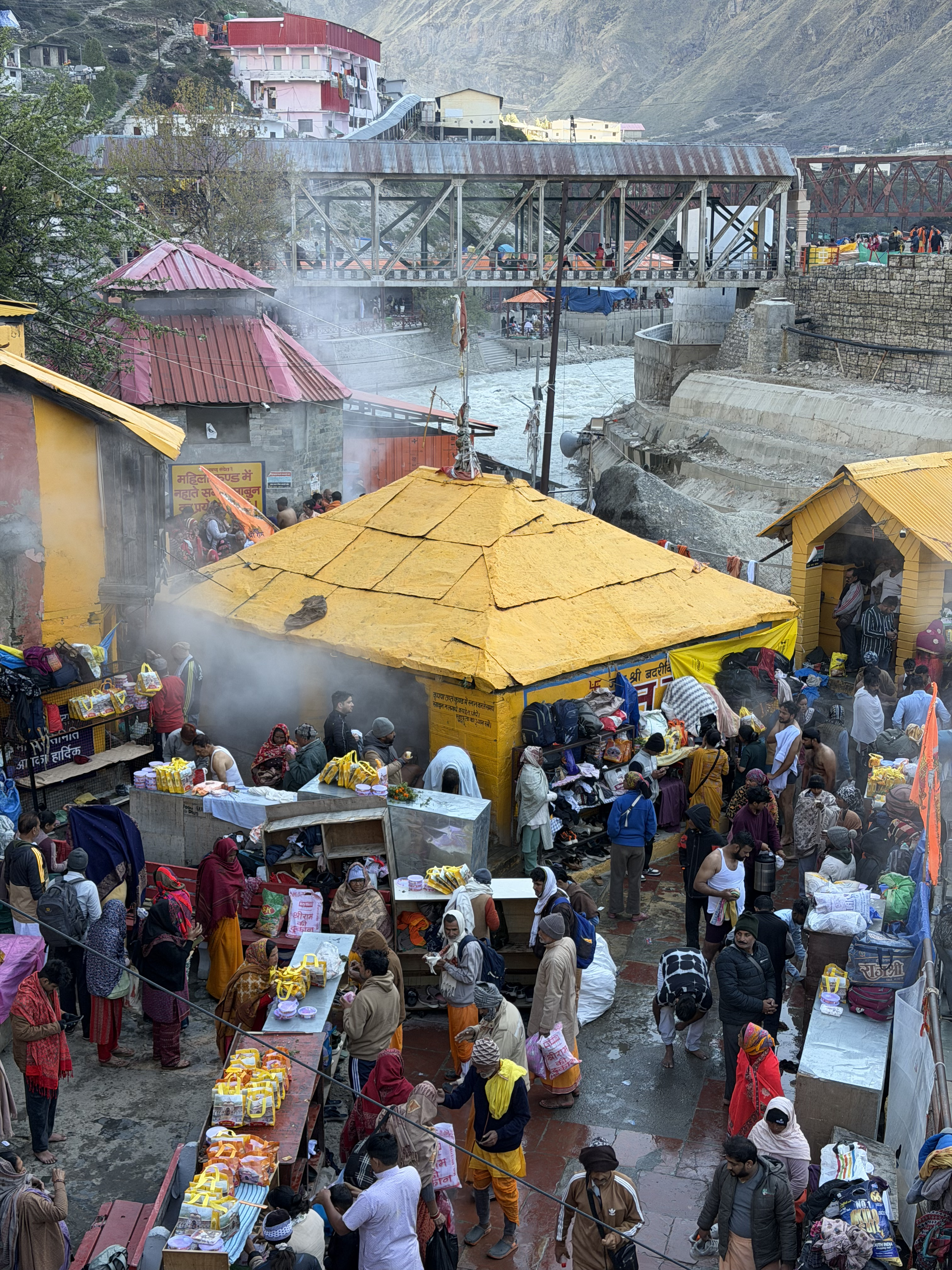
Tapt Kund hot springs next to Badrinath Temple, enclosed inside bath house

The temple is situated in the Garhwal Himalayas, along the banks of the Alaknanda River in Chamoli district in Uttarakhand. It lies at an elevation of 3133 m(10,279 ft) above mean sea level. Nar Parbat stands opposite to the temple, while Narayana Parbat is located behind the Neelkanth peak.

Adi Shankara established Badrinath as a pilgrimage site in the ninth century. The temple comprises three structures: the Garbhagriha (sanctum), the Darshan Mandapa (worship hall), and Sabha Mandapa (assembly hall). The sanctum's conical roof is approximately 15 m (49 ft) tall and features a small cupola topped with a gilt gold covering. The stone façade features arched windows, and a stairway to the main entrance, an arched gateway. Just inside lies a mandapa, a pillared hall that leads to the sanctum, or main shrine. The walls and pillars of the hall are adorned with intricate carvings.

The main shrine contains the 1 ft (0.30 m) Shaligram (black stone) deity of Badrinarayana, placed beneath a gold canopy under a Badri tree. The deity of Badrinarayana is depicted holding Panchajanya Shankha (conch) and Sudarshana Chakra (discus) in two raised arms while the other two arms rest on his lap in a Yogamudra (padmasana) posture. The sanctum also houses images of the god of wealth—Kubera, sage Narada, Uddhava, Nara and Narayana. The temple contains fifteen additional images that are worshipped within its premise. These include Lakshmi (the consort of Vishnu), Garuda (the vahana of Narayan), and Navadurga, the manifestation of Durga in nine forms. The temple also has shrines dedicated to Lakshmi Narasimhar and to saints such as Adi Shankara, Nar and Narayan, Ghantakarna, Vedanta Desika and Ramanujacharya. All of temple's deities are carved out of black stone.

The Tapt Kund, a group of hot sulphur springs just below the temple, are considered to be medicinal; many pilgrims consider it a requirement to bathe in the springs before visiting the temple. The springs have a year-round temperature of 55 °C (131 °F), while outside temperature is typically below 17 °C (63 °F) all year round. The two water ponds in the temple are called Narad Kund and Surya Kund.

== History ==
Chota Char Dham

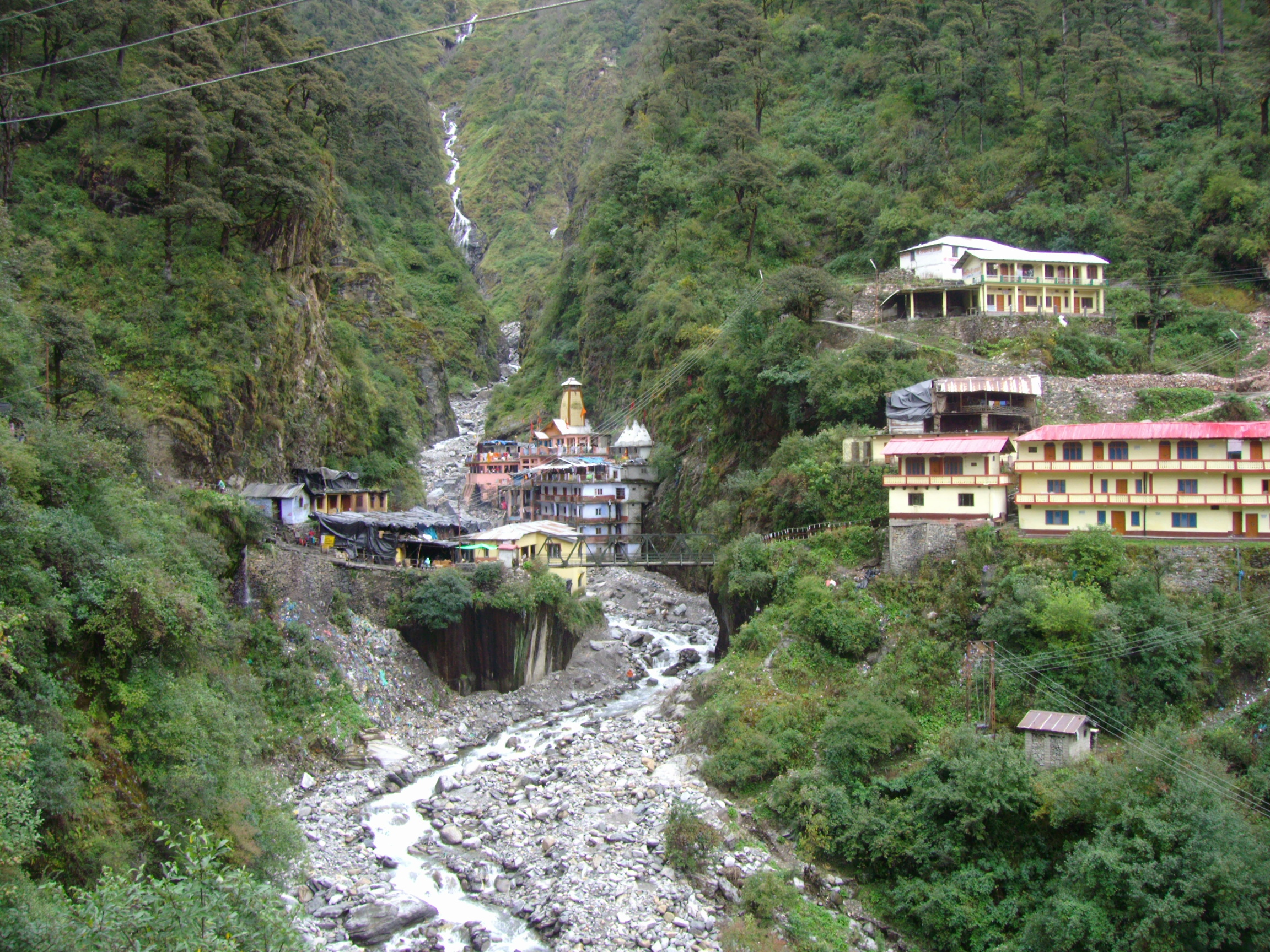
Yamunotri

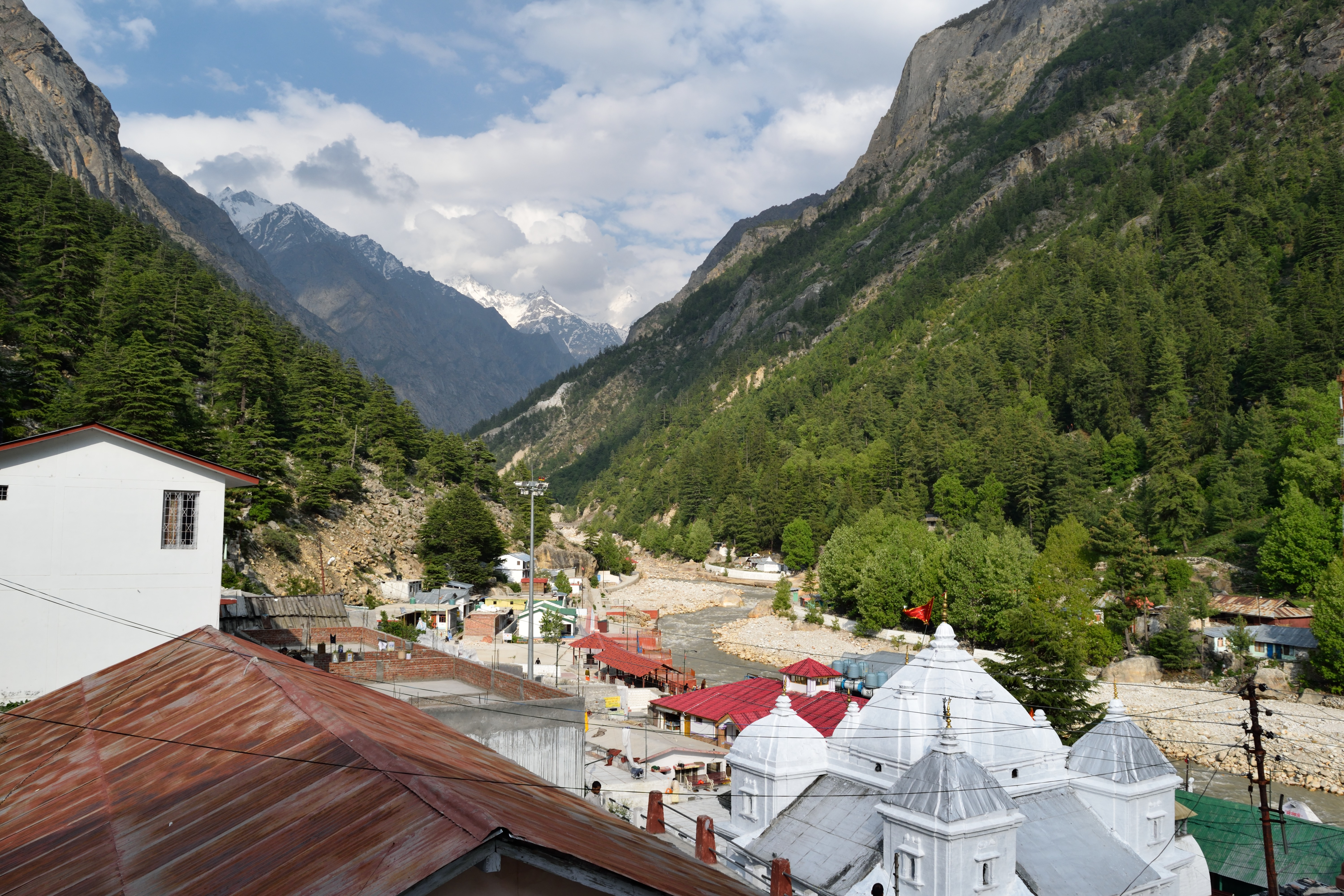
Gangotri

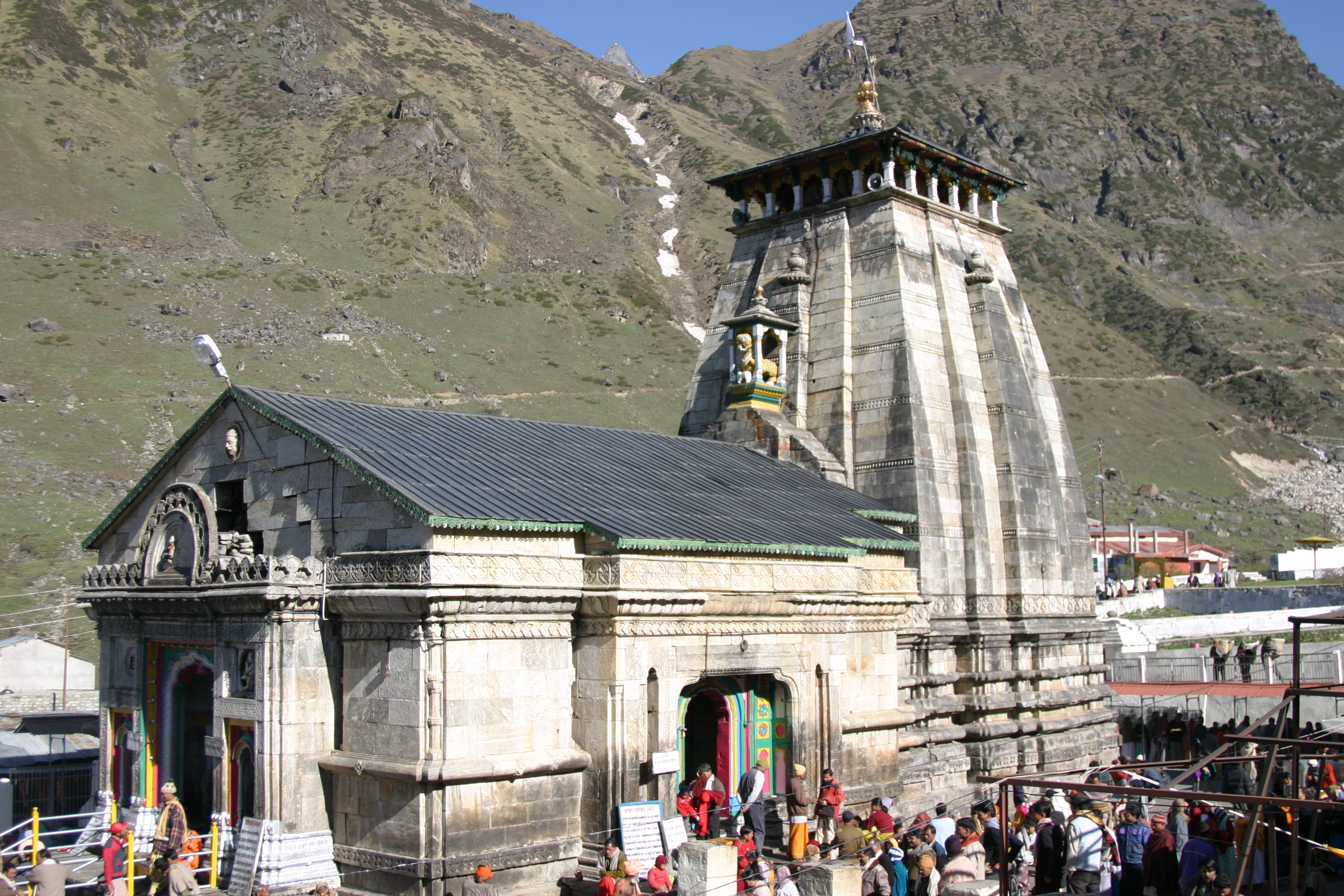
Kedarnath

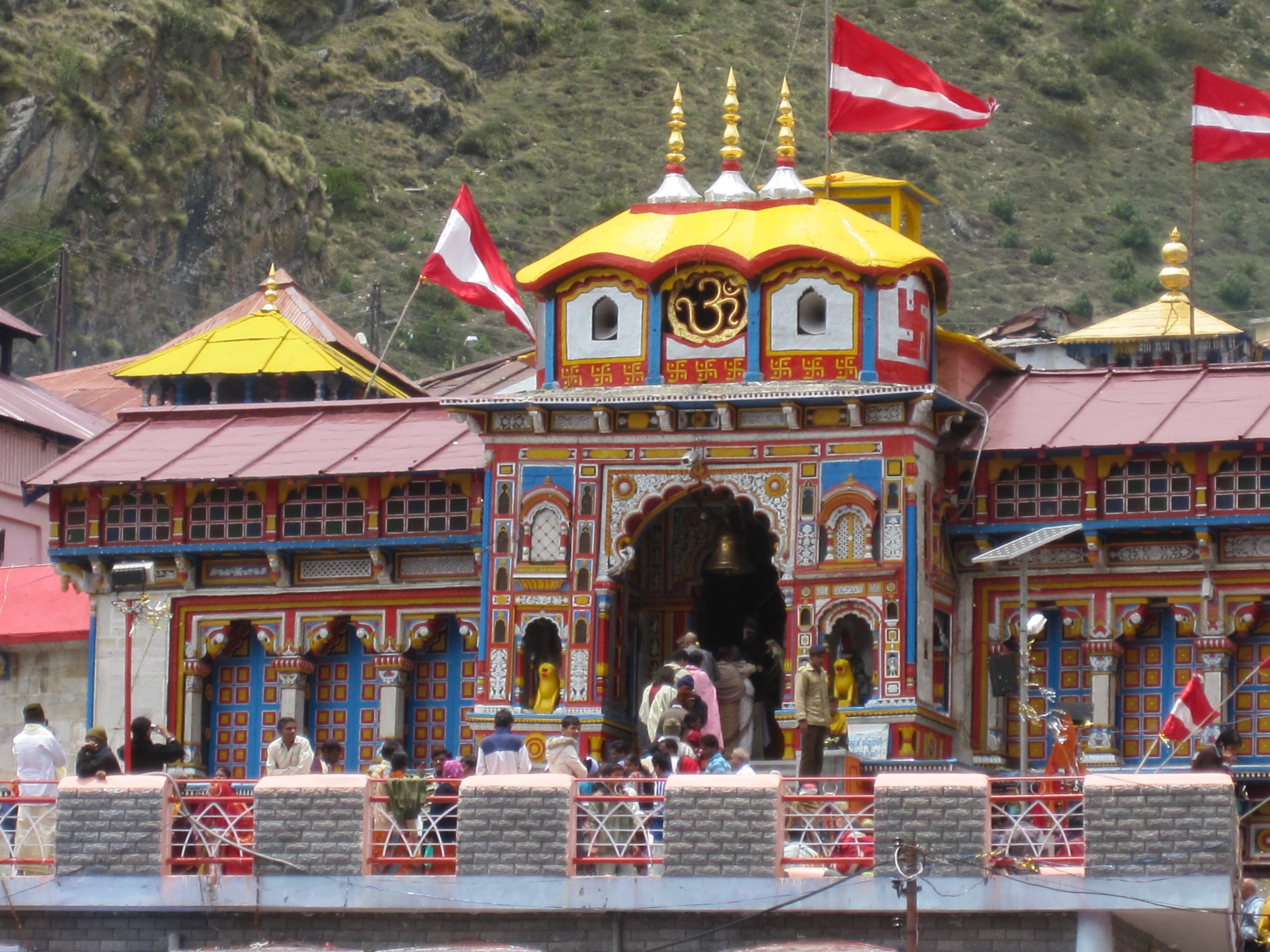
Badrinath

According to local tradition, the image of Badrinarayan was first served by Narada; later when the region became Buddhist, the Buddhists had Badrinarayan removed from the temple and thrown into the Tapt Kund. Later, Adi Shankara expelled all the Buddhists in the region, recovered Badrinarayan from the Tapt Kund, and reestablished the temple with the help of the Parmar ruler king Kanak Pal. The hereditary successors of the king governed the temple and endowed villages to meet its expenses. The income from a set of villages on the route to the temple was used to feed and accommodate pilgrims. The Parmar rulers held the title "Bolanda Badrinath", meaning speaking Badrinath. They had other titles, including Shri 108 Basdrishcharyaparayan Garharaj Mahimahendra, Dharmabibhab, and Dharamarakshak Sigamani.

According to another traditional story, Badrinarayan was removed from the temple and put into the Tapt Kund by the pujari (priest) who was forced to close the temple due to lack of pilgrims and revenue. When Ramanuja was in the Pandukeshwar temple, the Garhwali god Ghanta Karna possessed a person and told Ramanuja, who promptly went to Badrinath and reinstalled the deity.

The throne of Badrinath was named after the presiding deity; the king enjoyed ritual obeisance by the devotees before proceeding to the shrine. The practice was continued until the late 19th century. During the 16th century, the King of Garhwal moved the murti to the present temple. When the state of Garhwal was divided, the Badrinath temple came under British rule but the king of Garhwal continued as the chairman of the management committee. The selection of priest is done after consultation between Garhwal and Travancore royal families.

According to the Chaurasi Baithak (attributed to Gokulanatha), Vallabha visited the Badrinath temple on a fasting day and sought fruit, but finding none Badrinath ordered him to break the fasting rules and eat grain. There exists a baithak (seat) of Vallabha at the foot of the temple hill.

Tulsidas praises Nara-Narayana and Badarikashrama in his Vinaya Patrika.

The temple has undergone several major renovations due to its age and damage by an avalanche. In the 17th century, the temple was expanded by the Kings of Garhwal. After significant damage during the great 1803 Garhwal earthquake, it was largely rebuilt by the King of Jaipur.

Walter Hamilton's East-India Gazetteer (1828) described the temple as a conical structure 40 to 50 feet high, with a small cupola beneath a square shelving roof of copper surmounted by a gilded ball and spire, and reported that it had been left in so unstable a condition by a recent earthquake that it required propping to prevent its collapse. Hamilton recorded the principal image as about three feet high and cut in black stone, dressed in gold and silver brocade with only the head and hands uncovered.

It was still under renovation as late as the 1870s but these were completed by the time of the First World War. At that time, the town was still small, consisting of only the 20-odd huts housing the temple's staff, but the number of pilgrims was usually between seven and ten thousand. The Kumbh Mela festival held every twelve years raised the number of visitors to 50,000. Estimates from earlier in the century differ sharply. Hamilton put annual attendance at 50,000, most of them ascetics travelling on from the fair at Haridwar, whereas the East India Company revenue officer G. W. Traill, reporting on the same decades, estimated five to six thousand a year.The temple also enjoyed revenue from the rents owed to it by various villages bequeathed by various rajas.

=== Under colonial rule ===
Before the Gorkha occupation of Garhwal the king was titular head of the temple and appointed the rawal. The settlement that followed the East India Company's assumption of eastern Garhwal in 1815 removed that authority from Sudarshan Shah; only in 1841 did the Government of India direct Company officials to restore some of the king's rights and withdraw from the temple's religious affairs.

Temple income came chiefly from two categories of village whose revenues temple officials, rather than the king, were entitled to collect: gūṇṭh villages, whose revenue went to the temple itself, and sadābart villages, whose revenue funded the feeding of pilgrims. Because sadābart receipts often exceeded what was required, British officials applied the surplus to pilgrimage infrastructure; in 1852 John Strachey obtained sanction to use it for bridges at Karnaprayag and Rudraprayag on the routes to Badrinath and Kedarnath. A cholera outbreak in 1820 prompted the establishment of Garhwal's first public health facilities along the pilgrimage routes, at Srinagar, Barahat (Uttarkashi) and Joshimath.

Pilgrimage shaped the region's modern infrastructure under British rule. Traill, an early British administrator of the region, commenced building the first modern pilgrimage road from Haridwar to Badrinath early in the nineteenth century, and temple-linked revenue was soon applied to public works: in 1852 the administrator Strachey obtained approval from the Sadr Board of Revenue of the Northwest Provinces to use surplus sadābart funds for bridges at Karnaprayag and Rudraprayag on the routes to Kedarnath and Badrinath, and in 1860 his successor Beckett described the local committee constituted to distribute those funds as "entirely secular", applying them to dispensaries, roads, bridges and pilgrim shelters.

Queen Victoria's proclamation of 1858 and the Religious Endowments Act of 1863 (Act XX) required officials to withdraw from the management of religious endowments, though the Act was not applied to Garhwal and Kumaon until 1876. Successive commissioners nevertheless remained involved in the temple's affairs. In 1895 the Government of India commissioned a review of British policy towards Badrinath after the political agent to Tehri Garhwal advertised in South India for a successor to the office of naib rawal; the Governor-General's office concluded that Act XX had been ignored by successive commissioners and that the arrangements were irregular.

== Legend ==
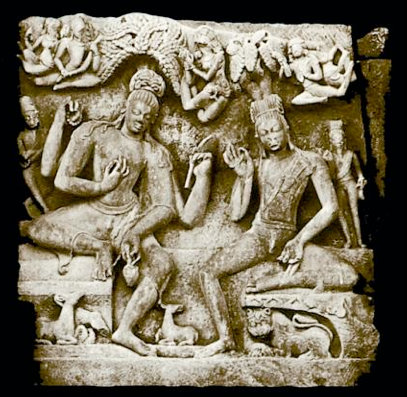
Nara and Narayana

According to Hindu legend, Vishnu sat in meditation at this place. During his meditation, Vishnu was unaware of cold weather. Lakshmi, his consort, protected him in the form of the Badri tree (jujube or Indian date, called 'ber' in Hindi). Pleased by the devotion of Lakshmi, Vishnu named the place Badrika Ashrama. According to Atkinson (1979), the place used to be a jujube forest, which is not found there today. Vishnu in the form of Badrinath is depicted in the temple sitting in the padmasana posture. According to Brahma Vaivarta purana, Vishnu was chastised by sage Narada, who saw Vishnu's consort, Lakshmi, massaging his feet. Vishnu went to Badrinath to perform austerity, meditating for a long time in padmasana.

The Vishnu Purana narrates another version of the origins of Badrinath. According to the tradition, Yama had two sons, Nara, and Narayana—both of which are modern names of Himalayan mountains. They chose the place to spread their religion and each of them wed the spacious valleys in the Himalayas. Searching for an ideal place to set up a hermitage, they came across the other four Badris of the Pancha Badri, namely Adibadri, Bridha Badri, Yoga-Dhyana Badri and Bhavisha Badri. They finally found the hot and cold spring behind the Alaknanda River and named it "Badri Vishala."

== Literature ==
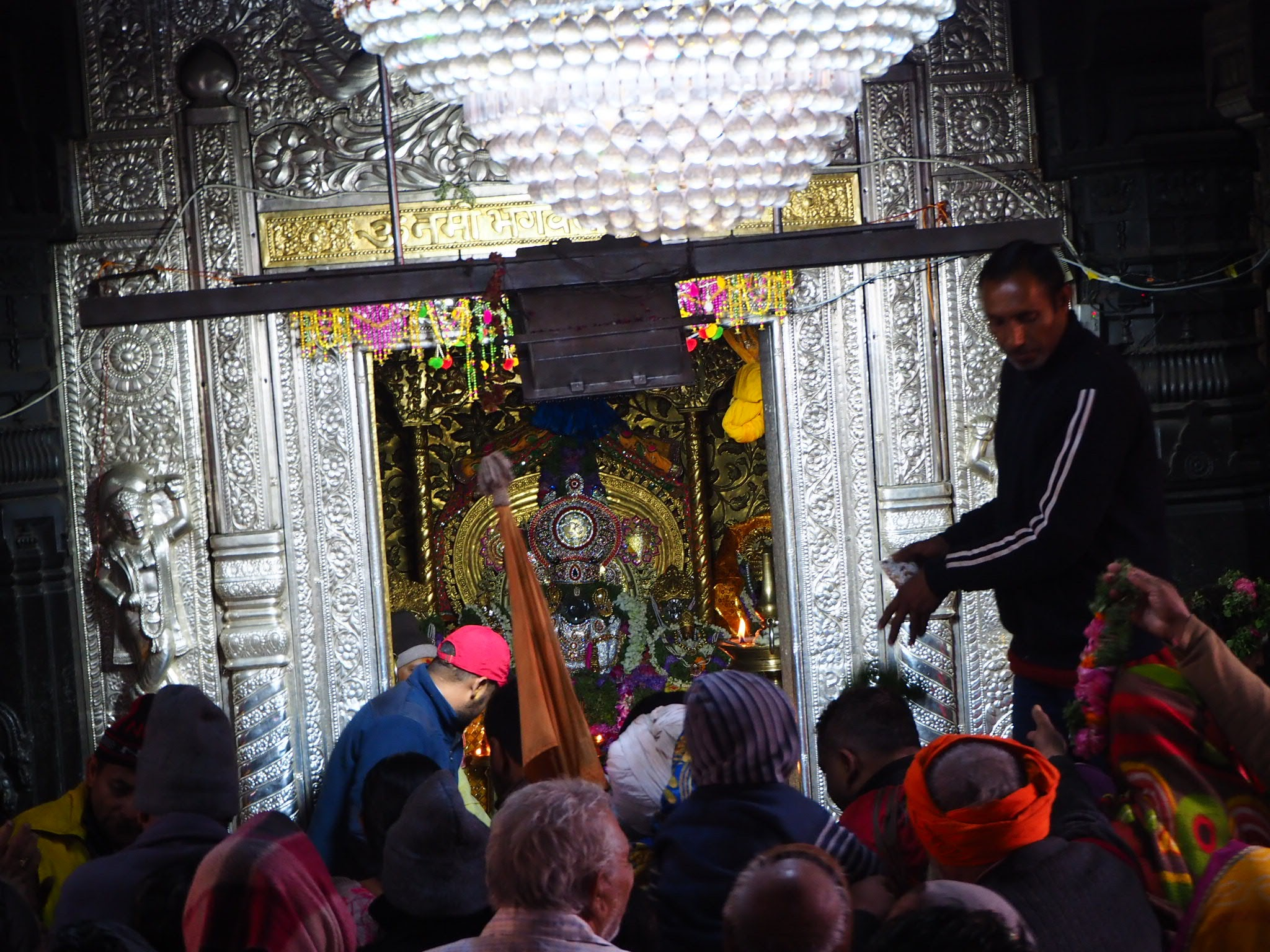
Badrinath deity inside the sanctum sanctorum of temple

The temple finds mention in several ancient books like Bhagavata Purana, Skanda Purana and Mahabharata. According to the Bhagavata Purana, "[t]here in Badrikashram the Personality of Godhead (Vishnu), in his incarnation as the sages Nar and Narayana, had been undergoing great penance since time immemorial for the welfare of all living entities". The Skanda Purana states that "[t]here are several sacred shrines in heaven, on earth, and in hell; but there is no shrine like Badrinath". The area around Badrinath is also celebrated in Padma Purana as abounding in spiritual treasures. The Mahabharata revered the holy place as the one which can give salvation to devotees arriving close to if, while in other holy places they must perform religious ceremonies. The temple is revered in Nalayira Divya Prabandham, in 11 hymns in the 7th–9th century Vaishnava canon by Perialvar and in 13 hymns by Thirumangai Alvar. It is one of the 108 Divya Desam dedicated to Vishnu, who is worshipped as Badrinath. The temple is referred as Tiruvatariyaacciraamam in Tamil literature.

== Pilgrimage ==
Char Dham

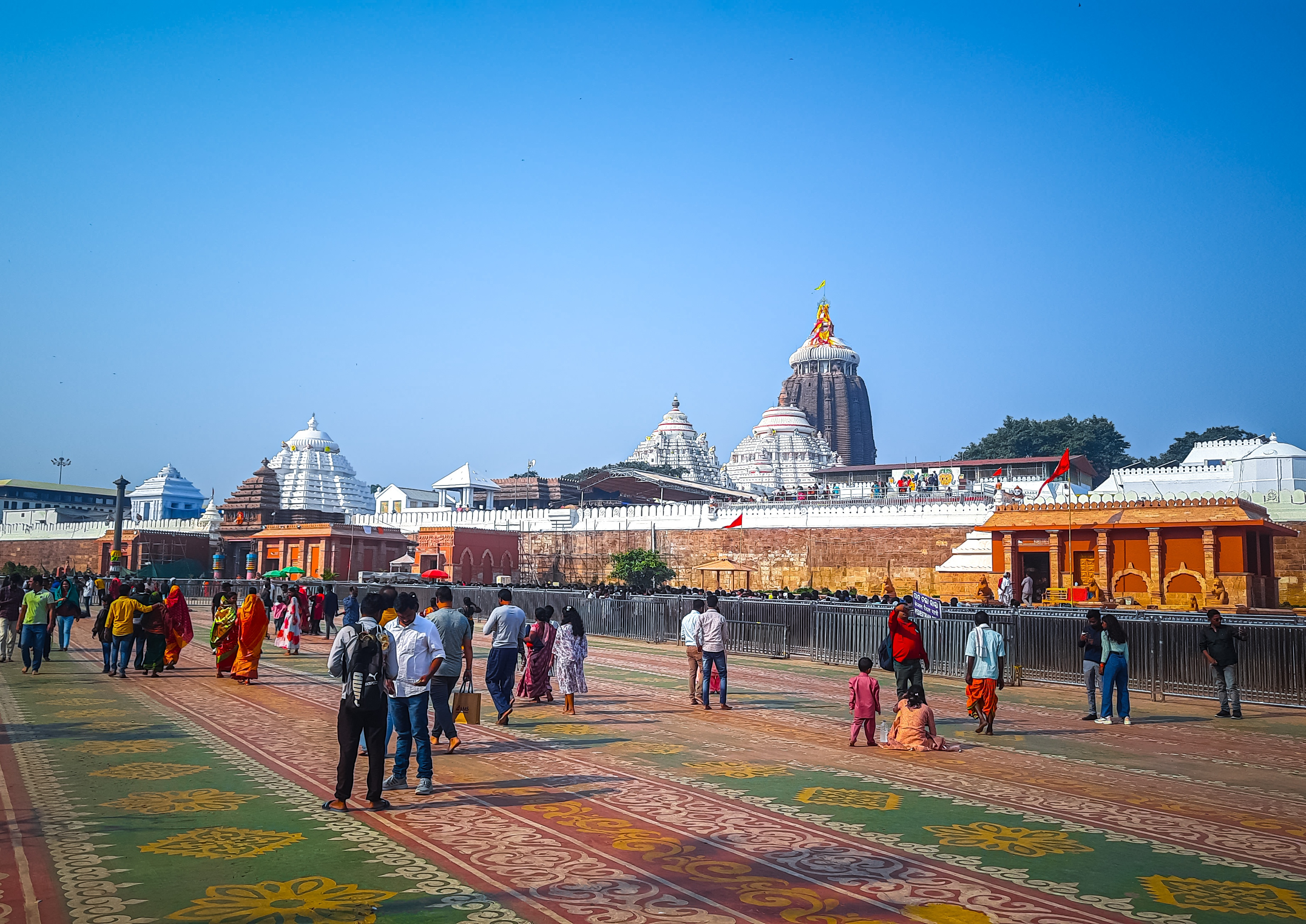
Jagannath Puri

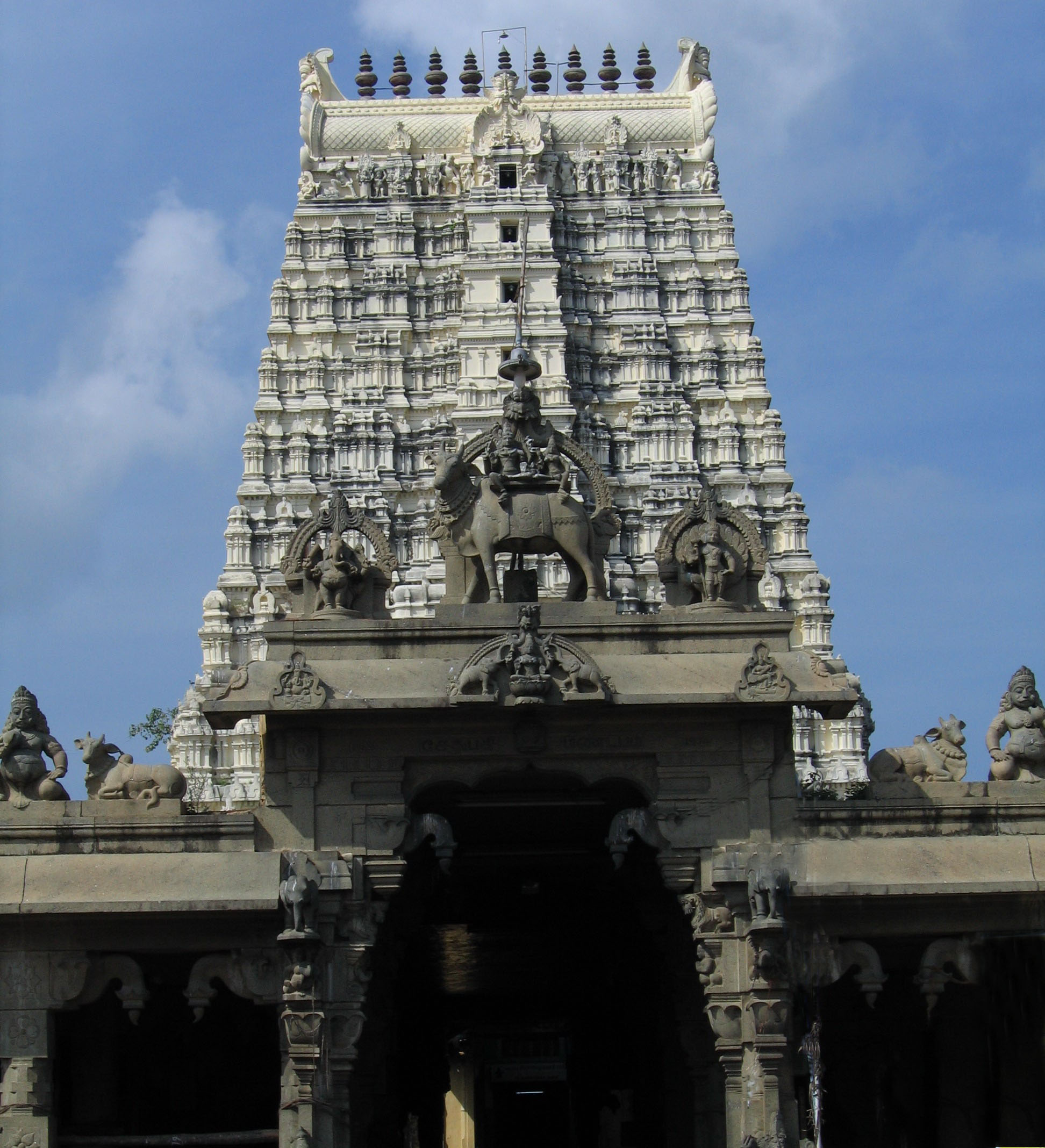
Rameswaram

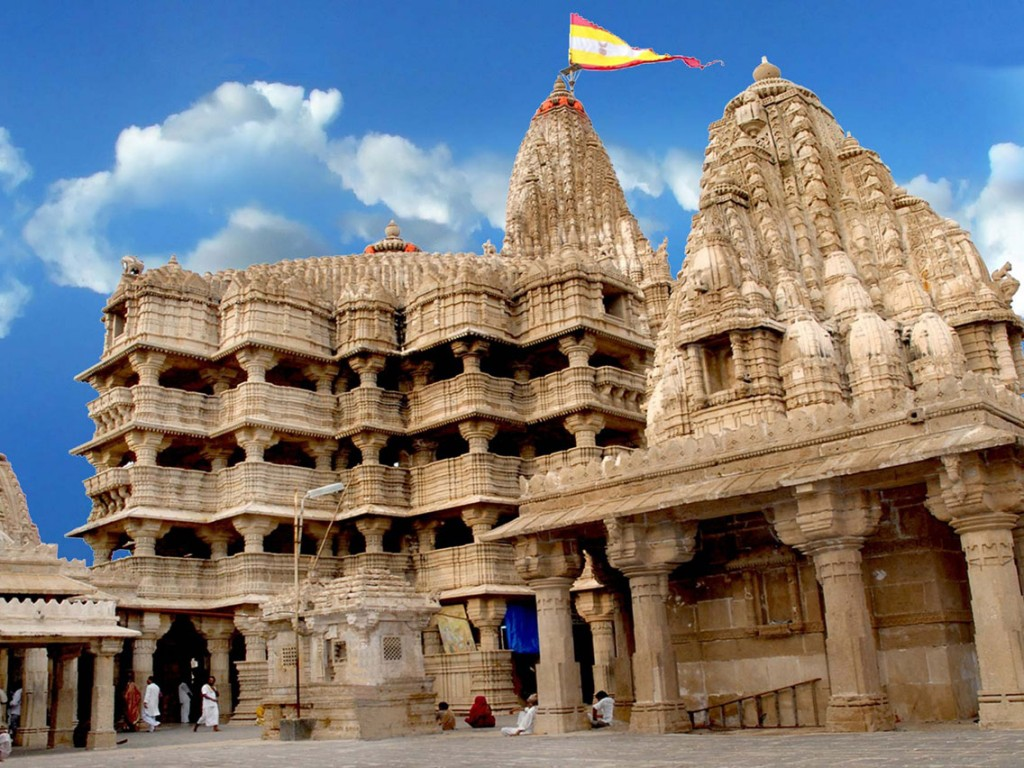
Dwarka

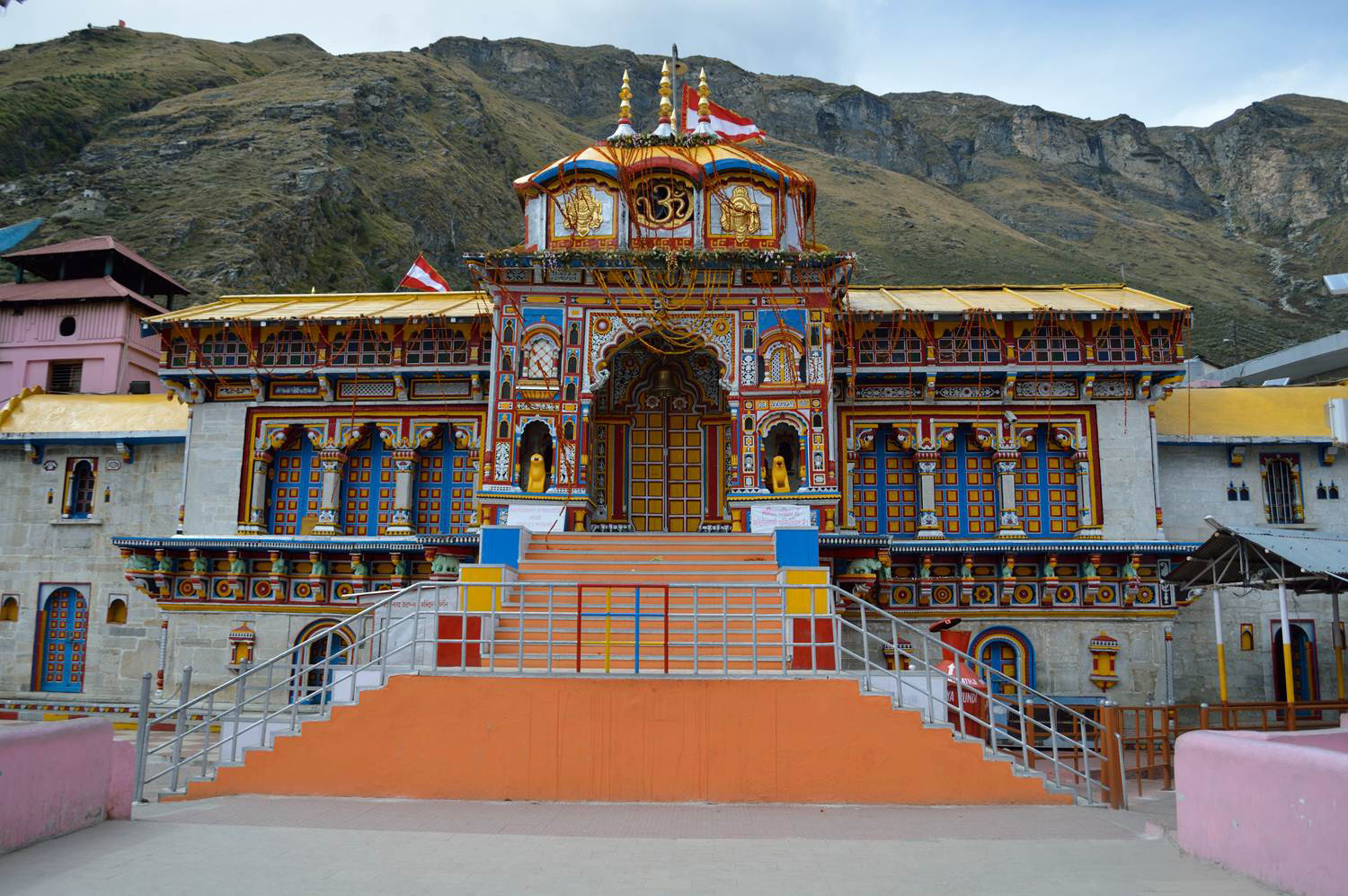
Badrinath

Number of tourists
Year	Pop.
1990	362,757
1995	275,900
2000	735,200
2005	566,524
2010	921,950
2012	1,060,000

Devotees of all faiths and all schools of thought of Hinduism visit the Badrinath Temple. All the major monastic institutions like Kashi Math, Jeeyar Mutt (Andhra mutt), Udupi Pejavar and Manthralayam Sri Raghavendra Swamy Mutts have their branches and guest houses there.

The Badrinath temple is one of five related shrines called Panch Badri, which are dedicated to the worship of Vishnu. The five temples are Vishal Badri - Badrinath Temple in Badrinath, Yogadhyan Badri located at Pandukeshwar, Bhavishya Badri located 17 km (10.6 mi) from Jyotirmath at Subain, Vridh Badri located 7 km (4.3 mi) from Jyotirmath in Animath and Adi Badri located 17 km (10.6 mi) from Karnaprayag. The temple is considered one of the holiest Hindu Char Dham (four divine) sites, comprising Rameswaram, Badrinath, Puri and Dwarka. Although the temple's origins are not clearly known, the Advaita school of Hinduism established by Adi Shankara attributes the origin of Char Dham to the seer. The four monasteries are located across the four corners of India and their attendant temples are Badrinath Temple at Badrinath in the North, Jagannath Temple at Puri in the East, Dwarakadheesh Temple at Dwarka in the West and Rameshwaram at Rameshwaram, Tamil Nadu in the South.

Though ideologically the temples are divided between the sects of Hinduism, namely Saivism and Vaishnavism, the Char Dham pilgrimage is an all-Hindu affair. There are four abodes in the Himalayas called Chota Char Dham (Chota meaning small): Badrinath, Kedarnath, Gangotri and Yamunotri—all of which lie in the foothills of the Himalayas. The name Chota was added during the mid of 20th century to differentiate the original Char Dhams. As the number of pilgrims to these places has increased in modern times, it is called Himalayan Char Dham.

The journey across the four cardinal points in India is considered sacred by Hindus, who aspire to visit these temples once in their lifetimes. Traditionally, the pilgrimage starts at the eastern end from Puri, proceeding clockwise in a manner typically followed for circumambulation in Hindu temples.

== Festivals and religious practices ==
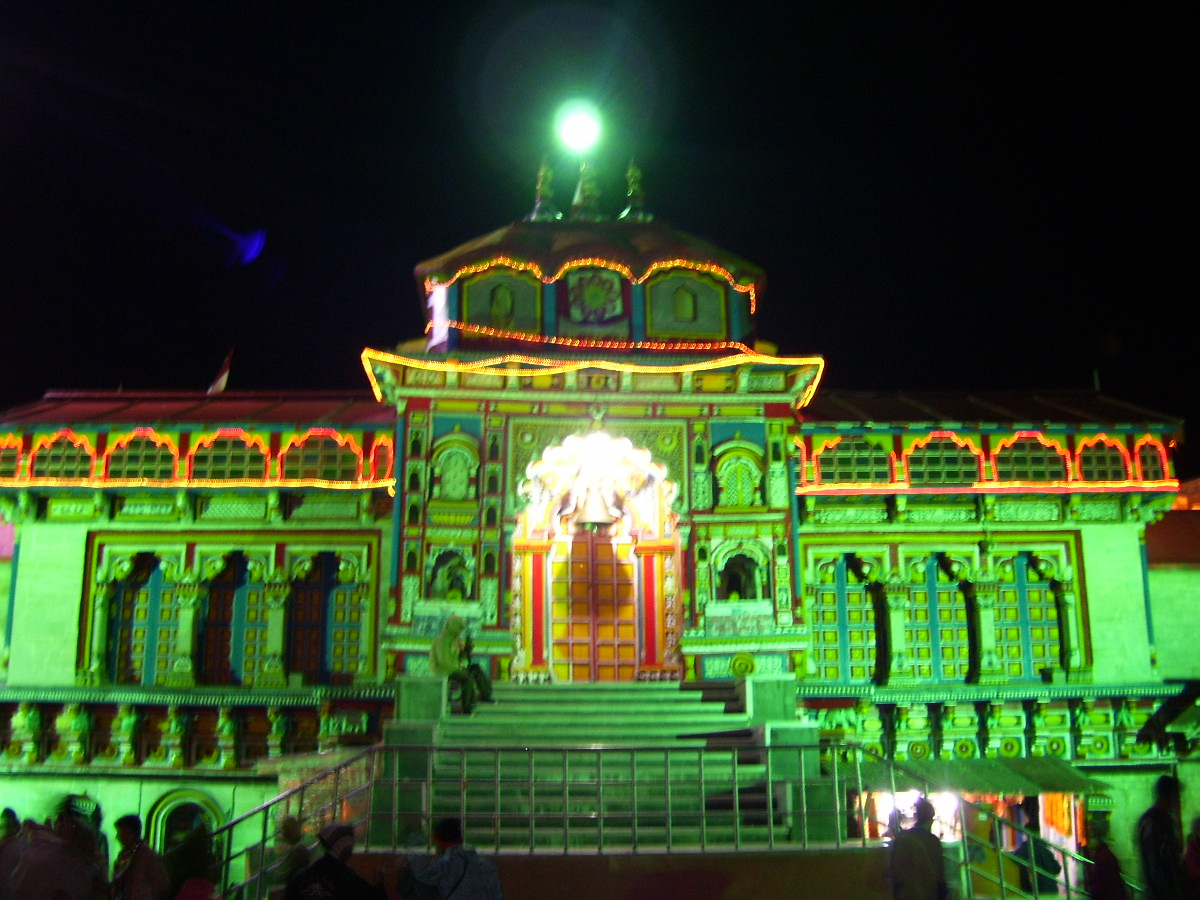
Badrinath Temple at night

The most prominent festival held at Badrinath Temple is Mata Murti Ka Mela, which commemorates the descent of the river Ganges on mother earth. The mother of Badrinath, who is believed to have divided the river into twelve channels for the welfare of earthly beings, is worshiped during the festival. The place where the river flowed became the holy land of Badrinath.

The Badri Kedar festival is celebrated during the month of June in both the temple and the Kedarnath temple. The festival lasts for eight days; artists from all over the country perform during the function.

The major religious activities (or pujas) performed every morning are mahabhishek (ablution), abhishek, gitapath and bhagavat puja, while in the evening the pujas include geet govinda and aarti. Recital in vedic scripts like Ashtotram and Sahasranama is practised during all the rituals. After aarti, the decorations are removed from the image of Badrinath and sandalwood paste is applied to it. The paste from the image is given to the devotees the next day as prasad during the nirmalaya darshan. All the rituals are performed in front of the devotees, unlike those in some Hindu temples, where some practices are hidden from them. Sugar balls and dry leaves are the common prasad provided to the devotees. From May 2006, the practise of offering Panchamrit Prasad, prepared locally and packed in local bamboo baskets, was started.

The temple is closed for winter on the auspicious day of bhatridwityia or later during October–November. On the day of closure, Akhanda Jyothi, a lamp is lit filled with ghee to last for six months. Special pujas are performed on the day by the chief priest in the presence of pilgrims and officials of the temple. The image of Badrinath is notionally transferred during the period to the Narasimha temple at Jyotirmath, located 40 mi (64 km) away from the temple. The temple is reopened around April–May on Akshaya tritiya, another auspicious day on the Hindu calendar. Pilgrims gather on the first day of opening of the temple after the winter to witness the Akhanda Jyothi.

The temple is one of the holy places where the Hindus offer oblations to ancestors with the help of the priests. Devotees visit the temple to worship in front of the image of Badrinath in the sanctum and have a holy dip in Alaknanda River. The general belief is that a dip in the tank purifies the soul.

== Administration and visit ==
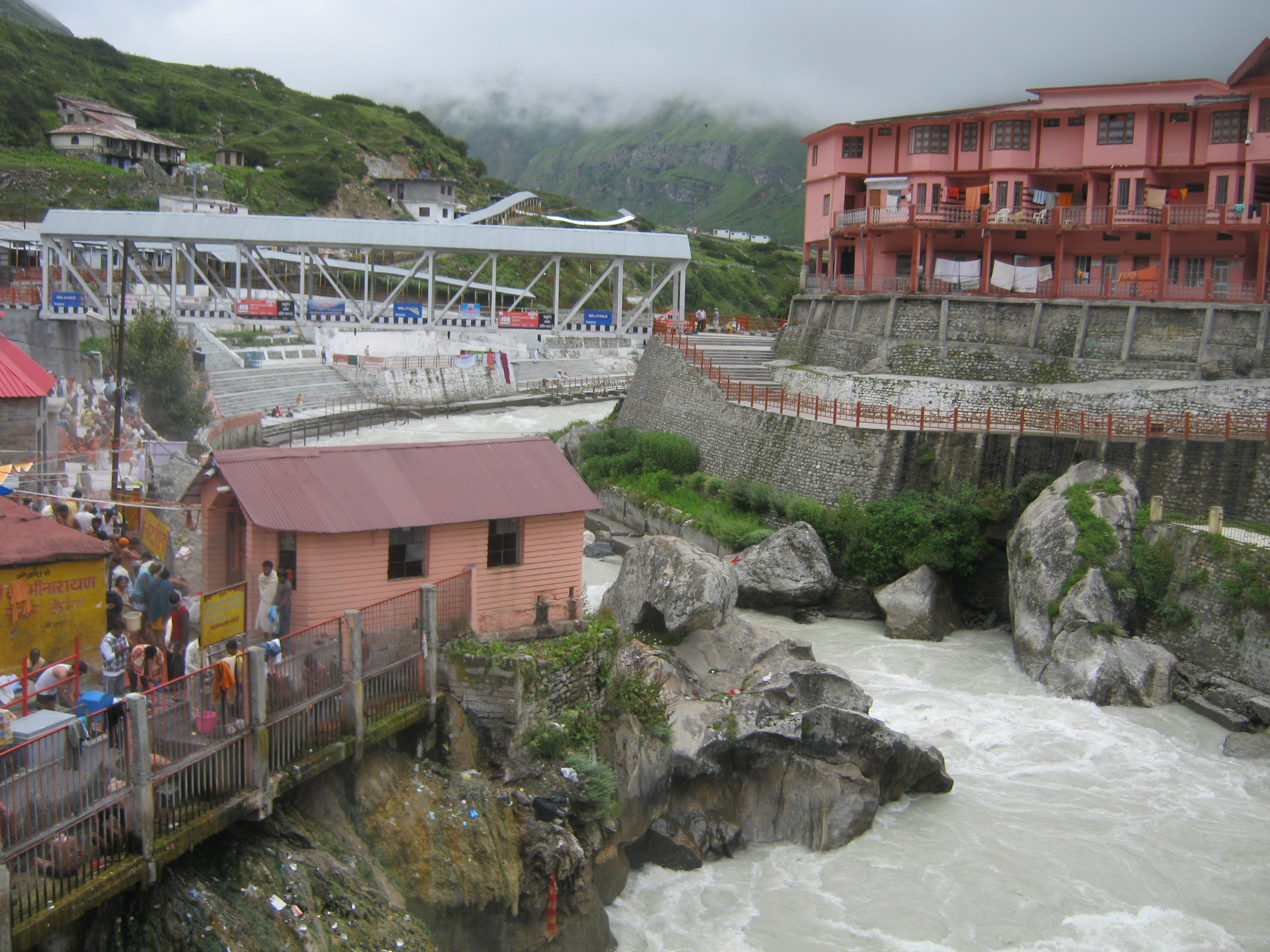
Alaknanda River in Badrinath

The Badrinath Temple was included in the Uttar Pradesh State Government Act No. 30/1948 as Act no. 16,1939, which was later known as Shri Badarinath and Shri Kedarnath Mandir Act. A committee nominated by the State Government of Uttarakhand administers both the temples. The act was modified in 2002 to appoint additional committee members, including government officials and a vice-chairman. There are seventeen members in the board; three selected by the Uttarakhand Legislative Assembly, one member each selected by the District Councils of Chamoli Pauri Garhwal, Tehri Garhwal and Uttarkashi districts, and ten members nominated by the Government of Uttarakhand.

As indicated in the temple records, the priests of the temple were Shiva ascetics called Dandi Sanyasis, who belonged to Nambudiri community, a religious group common in modern Kerala. When the last of the ascetics died without an heir in 1776 CE, the King of Garhwal invited non-ascetic Nambudiris from Kerala for the priesthood, a practice that continues in modern times. Till 1939, all the offerings made by the devotees to the temple went to the Rawal (Chief Priest), but after 1939, his jurisdiction was restricted to religious affairs. The administrative structure of the temple consists of a chief executive officer who executes the orders from the state government, a deputy chief executive officer, two OSDs, an executive officer, an account officer, a temple officer, and a public officer to assist the chief executive officer.

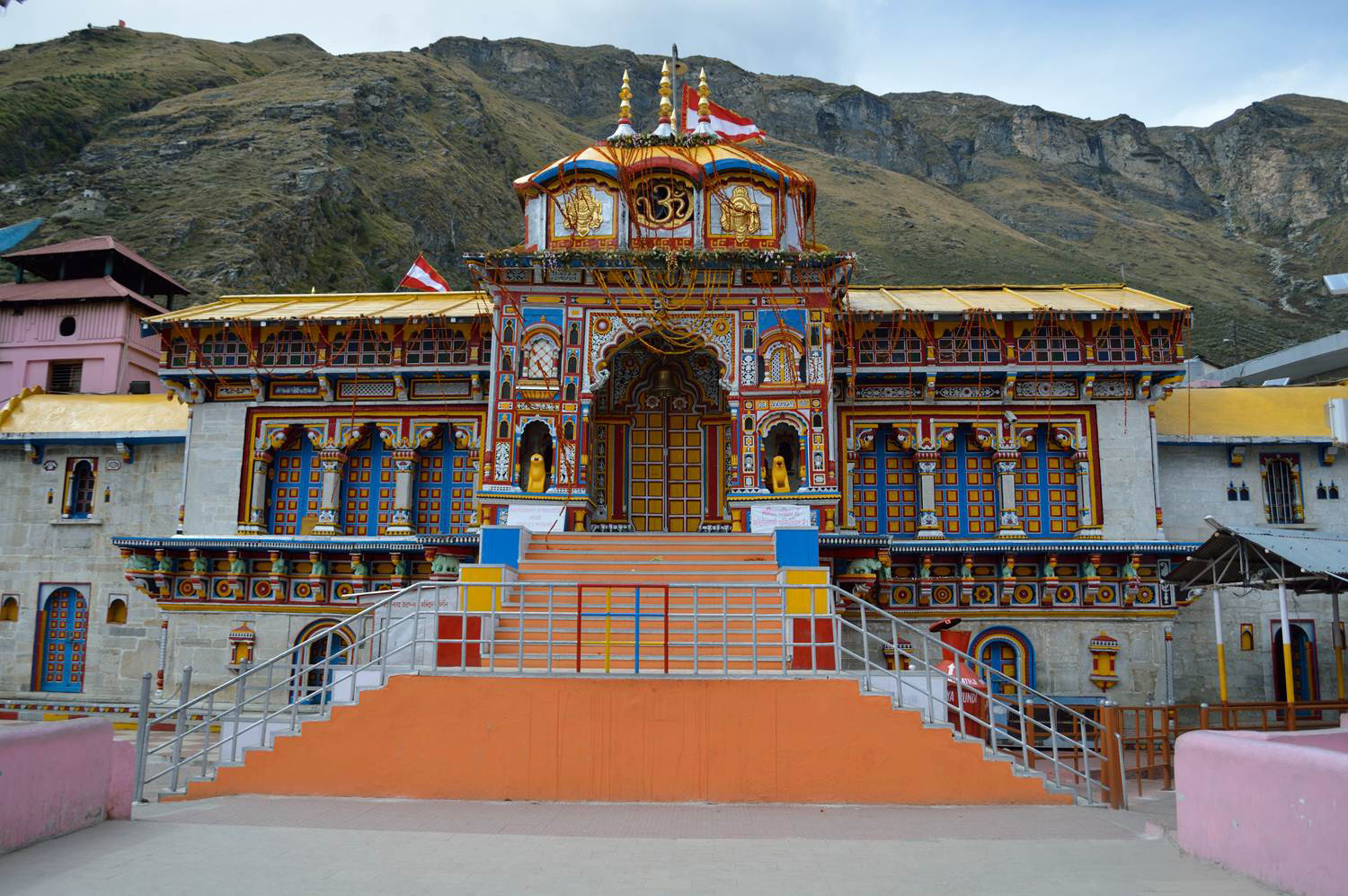
View of the temple during Summer

Although Badrinath is located in North India, the head priest, or Rawal, is traditionally a Nambudiri Brahmin chosen from the South Indian state of Kerala. This tradition is believed to have been initiated by Adi Shankara, who was a South Indian philosopher. The Rawal is requested by the Government of Uttarakhand to the Government of Kerala. The candidate should possess a degree of Acharya (Post Graduate) in Sanskrit, be a bachelor, well-versed in reciting mantras (sacred texts) and be from the Vaishnava sect of Hinduism. The erstwhile ruler of Garhwal, who is the tutelary head of Badrinath, approves the candidate sent by the Government of Kerala. A Tilak Ceremony is held to instate the Rawal and he is deputed from April to November when the temple remains open. The Rawal is accorded his holiness status by the Garhwal Rifles and the state government of Uttarakhand. He is also held in high esteem by the Royals of Nepal. From April to November, he performs his duties as a temple priest. Thereafter, he either stays in Jyotirmath or returns to his native village in Kerala. The duties of the Rawal starts at 4 a.m. every day with the Abhisheka. He should not cross the river until Vamana Dwadashi and must adhere to Brahmacharya. The Rawal is assisted by the Garhwali Dimri Brahmins belonging to the village Dimmar of Chamoli district, Naib Rawal, Dharmadikari, Vedpathi, a group of priests, Pandas Samadhi, Bhandari, Rasoiyas (cook), devotional singer, clerk of devashram, Jal Bhariya (water keeper) and temple guards. Badrinath is one of the few temples in North India that follow the ancient Tantra Vidhi of Shrauta tradition more common in the south.

During 2006, the state government announced the area around Badrinath as a no construction zone to curb illegal encroachment.

In 2012, the temple administration introduced a token system for visitors to the temple. Tokens indicating the time of visit were provided from three stalls in the taxi stands. Each devotee to visit the presiding deity is allocated 10–20 seconds. Proof of identity is mandatory to enter the temple. The temple is reached from Rishikesh, located 298 km (185 mi) away via Devprayag, Rudraprayag, Karnaprayag, Nandaprayag, Jyotirmath, Vishnuprayag and Devadarshini. From Kedarnath Temple, visitors can follow the 243 km (151 mi)-long Rudraprayag route or the 230 km (140 mi)-long Ukhimath and Gopeshwar route.

== See also ==
- Rameshwaram
- Religious tourism in India
