= Char Dham =

Four Hindu pilgrimage sites in India

Char Dham

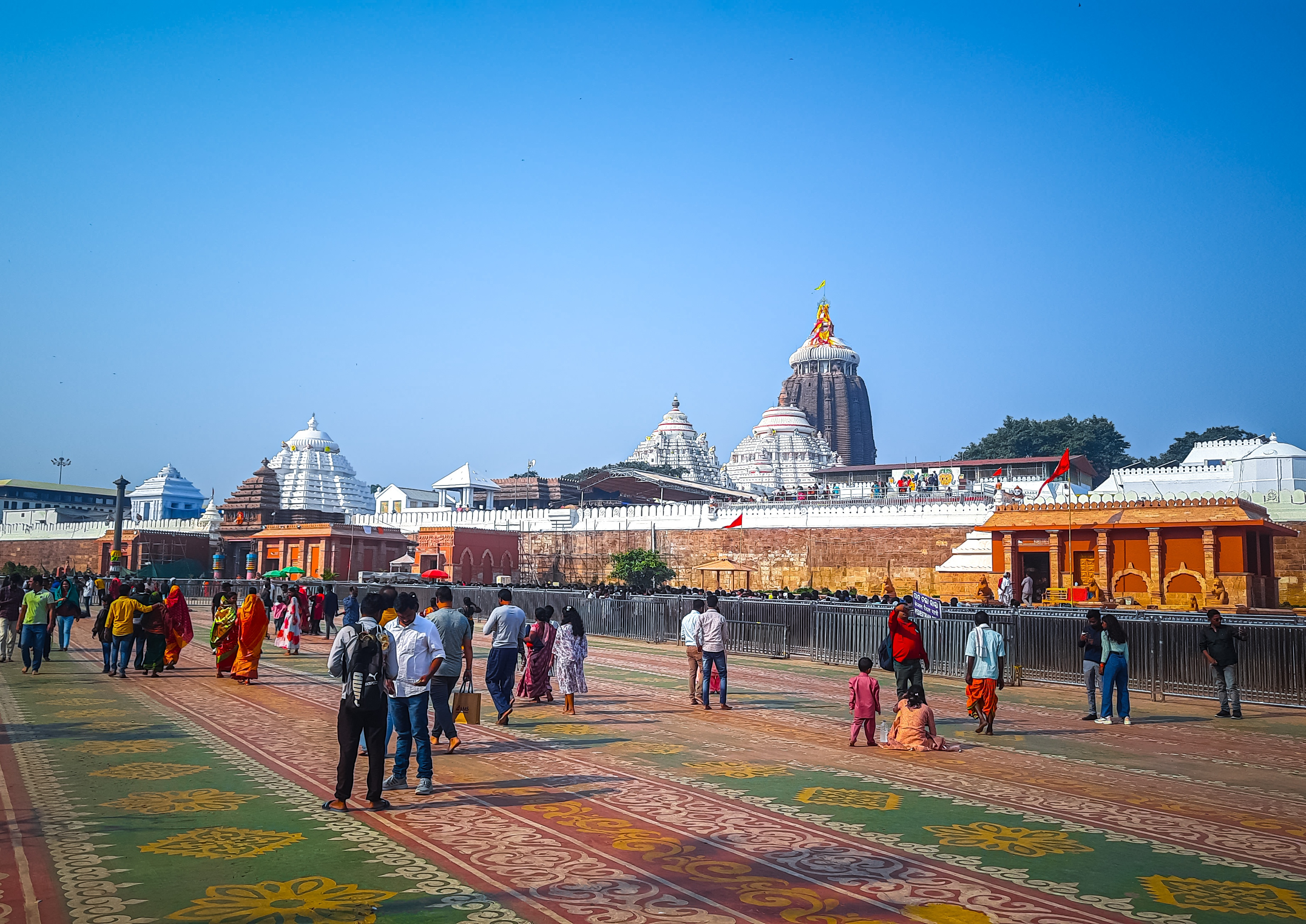
Jagannath Puri

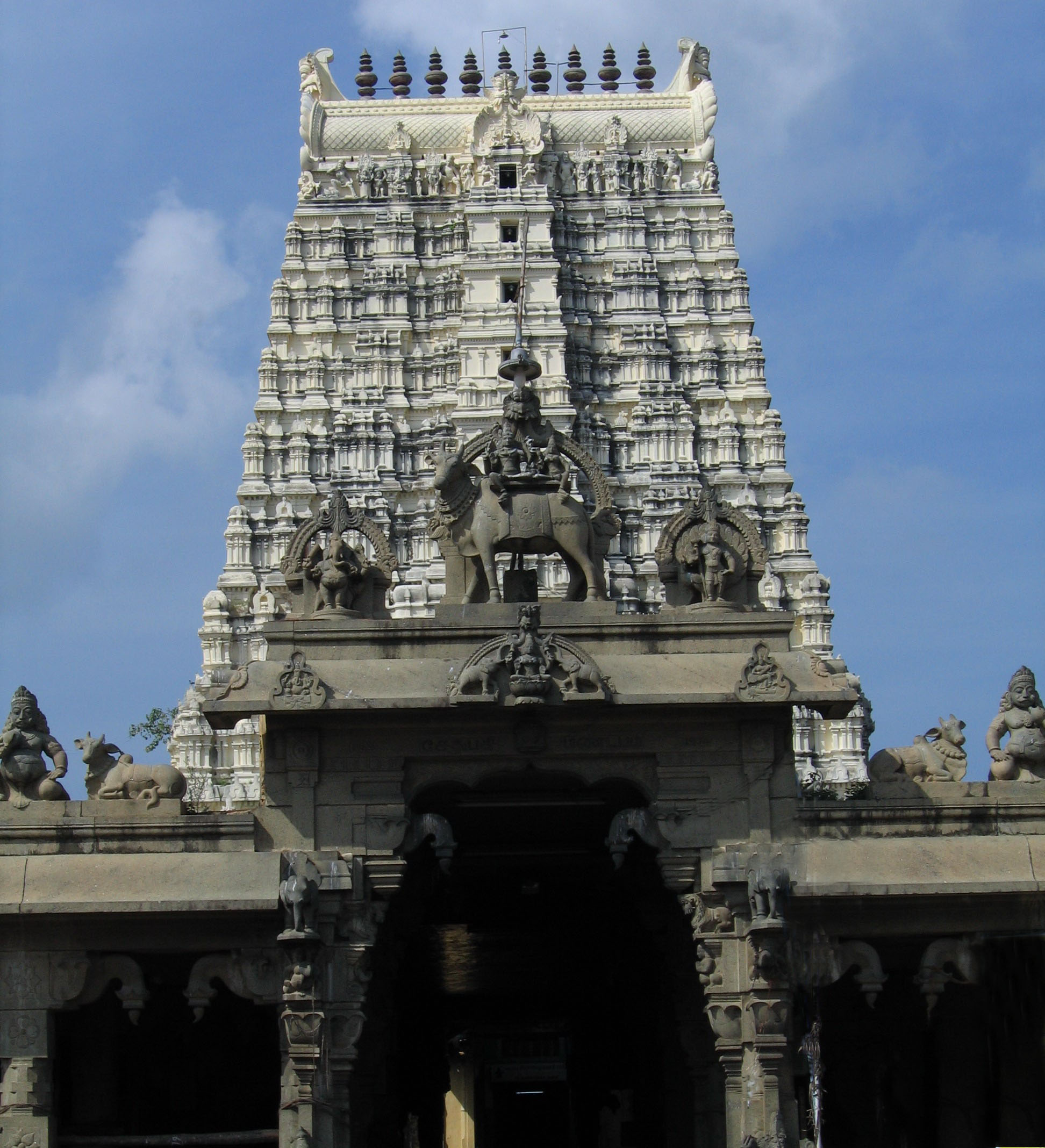
Rameswaram

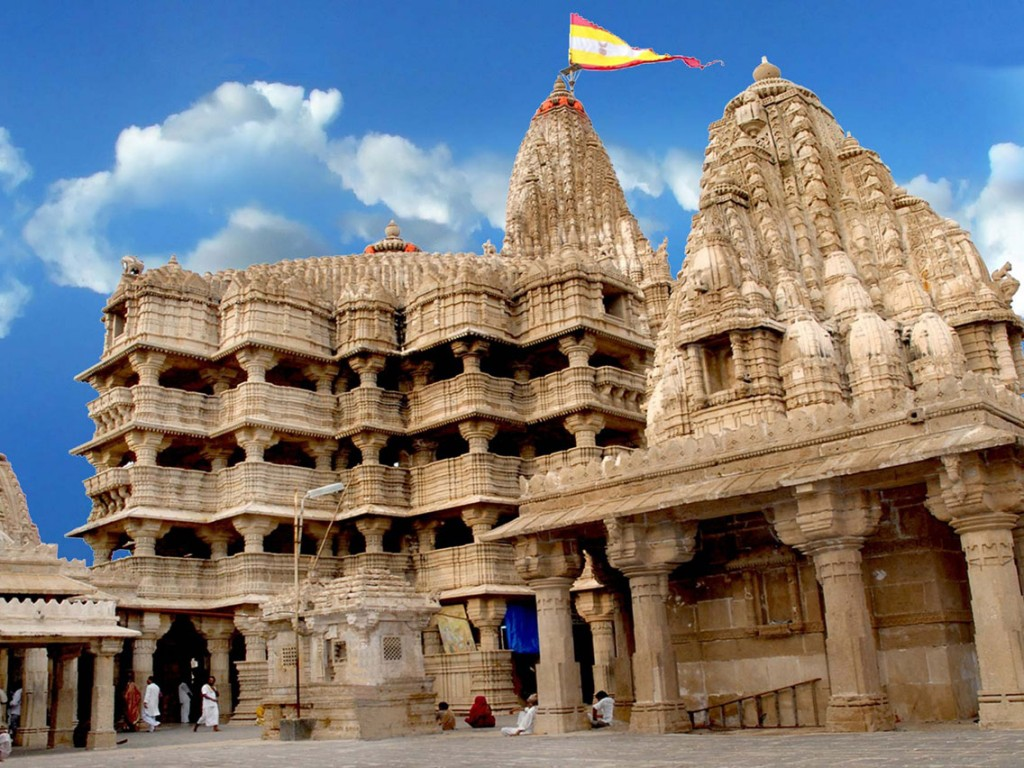
Dwarka

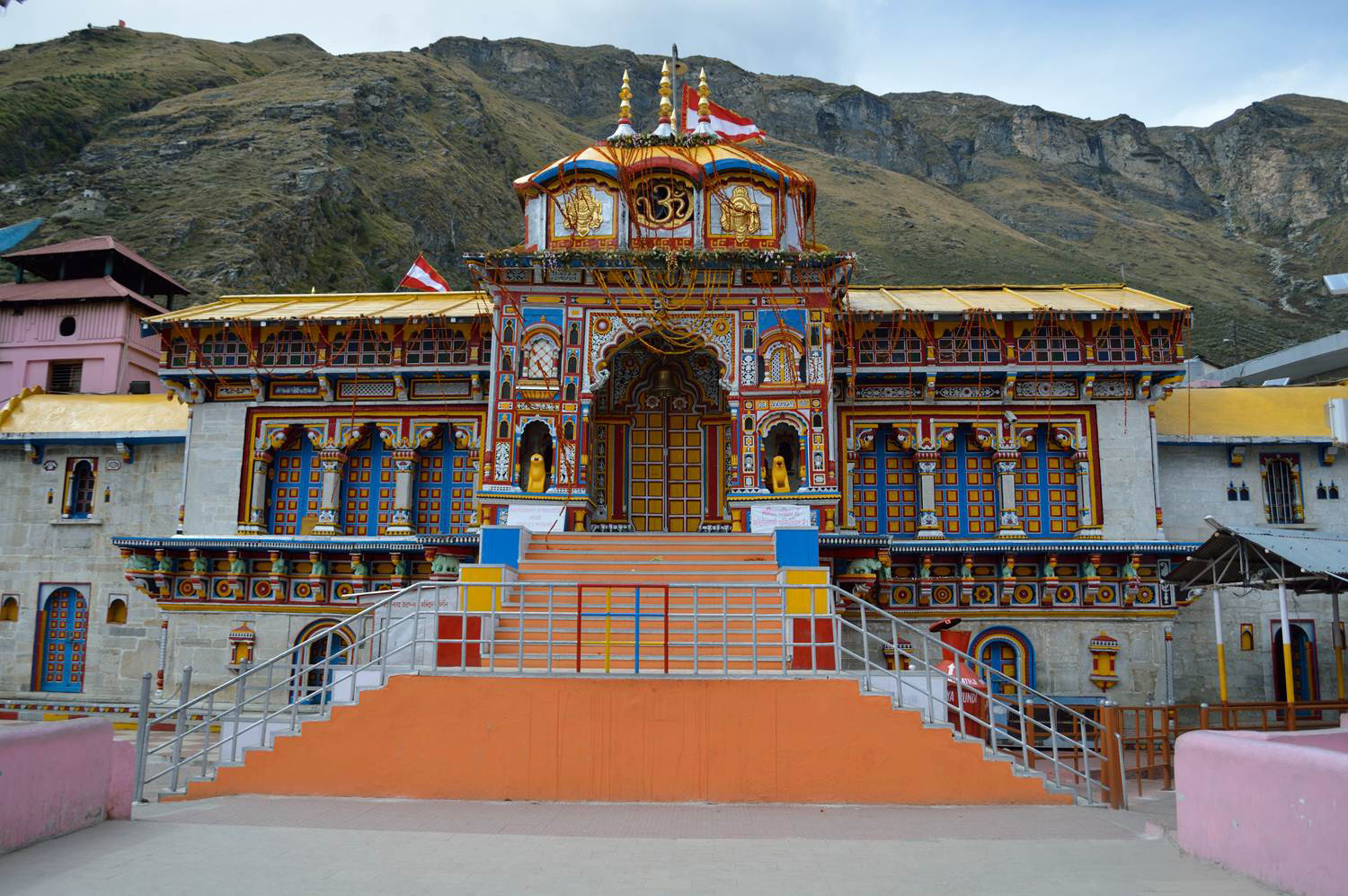
Badrinath

Locations of the Char Dham

The Char Dham (Hindi: चारधाम, romanized: Cārdhām transl. the four abodes), or the Chatur Dhama (Sanskrit: चतुर्धाम, romanized: Caturdhāma), is a set of four Hindu pilgrimage sites in India, consisting of Badrinath, Dwarka, Puri and Rameswaram. Badrinath, Dwarka, and Puri are shrines of Vishnu, whereas Rameswaram is a shrine of Shiva.

Defined by Adi Shankara, each dhāma represents a particular yuga, with Badrinath representing Satya Yuga, Rameswaram representing Treta Yuga, Dwarka representing Dvapara Yuga, and Puri representing Kali Yuga. Many Hindus believe that visiting these sites can help them achieve moksha.

The Char Dham is not to be confused with the Chota Char Dham which comprises Yamunotri, Gangotri, Kedarnath, Badrinath. It is a Hindu pilgrimage circuit in Uttarakhand which was named by the religious tourism industry.

== Description ==
The second dhāma, Rameswaram, has its origins in the Treta Yuga when Rama installed a lingam there and worshipped it to get atonement from Shiva for slaying Ravana, a devotee of Shiva. It is believed that Rama's footprints are imprinted there.

The third dhāma, Dwaraka, was established in the Dvapara Yuga when Krishna made the city his residence.

The monk Adi Shankara organised four maṭhas to correspond to the four sites of the Char Dham: the headquarters at Dwarka in the West, Puri in the East, Sringeri Sharada Peetham in the South and Badarikashrama in the North.

The table below gives an overview of the four Amnaya Maṭhas founded by Adi Shankara.

Shishya (lineage)	Direction	Maṭha	Mahāvākya	Veda	Sampradaya
Padmapāda	East	Govardhana Pīṭhaṃ	Prajñānam brahma (Consciousness is Brahman)	Rig Veda	Bhogavala
Sureśvara	South	Sringeri Śārada Pīṭhaṃ	Aham brahmāsmi (I am Brahman)	Yajur Veda	Bhūrivala
Hastāmalakācārya	West	Dvāraka Pīṭhaṃ	Tattvamasi (That thou art)	Sama Veda	Kitavala
Toṭakācārya	North	Jyotirmaṭha Pīṭhaṃ	Ayamātmā brahma (This self "soul" is Brahman)	Atharva Veda	Nandavala

== Sites of the Char Dham ==
=== Puri ===
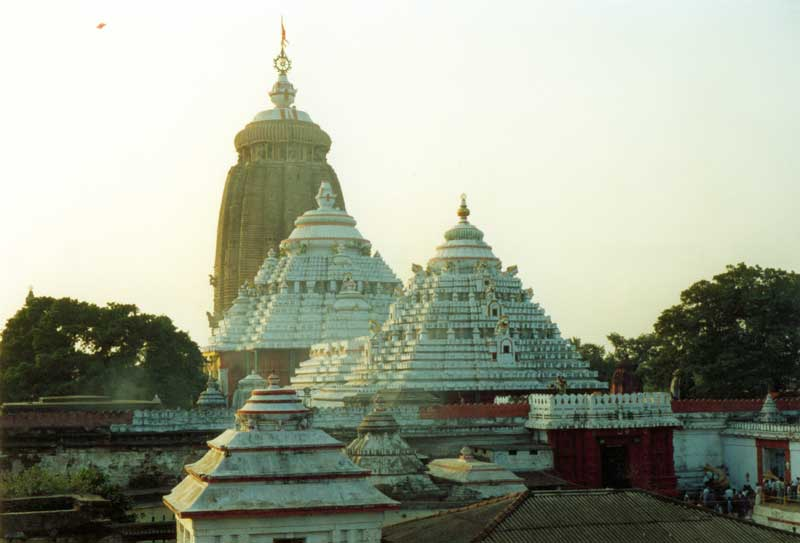
Jagannath Temple, Puri

Puri is located in the state of Odisha and is one of the oldest cities in the eastern part of the country, on the coast of the Bay of Bengal. The main deity worshipped there is Krishna, revered as Jagannath. It is the only shrine in India where Subhadra, the sister of Krishna, is worshipped along with her brothers, Jagannatha and Balabhadra. As per temple records, King Indradyumna of Avanti built the main temple of Jagannath at Puri. Starting in the tenth century, the first king of the Eastern Ganga dynasty, Anantavarman Chodaganga, rebuilt the present temple on the site of the pre-existing temples in the compound, excluding the main Jagannath temple. .

=== Dwarka ===
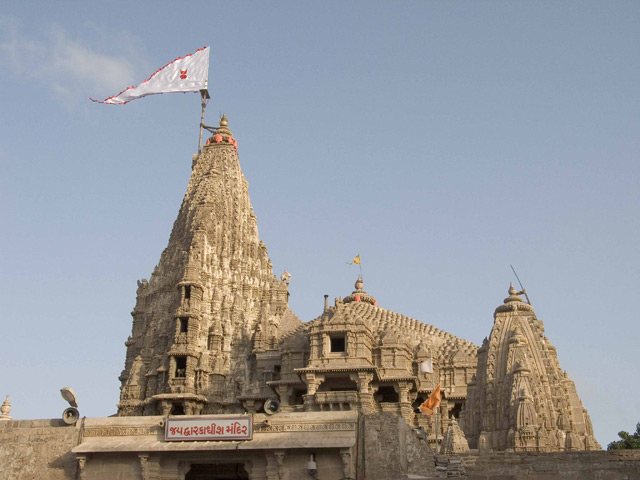
Dwarakadheesh Temple, Dwarka

Dwarka is located in the state of Gujarat on the westernmost coast of India. The city derives its name from the word "dvara" meaning door or gate in the Sanskrit language. It is located where the Gomti River merges into the Arabian Sea. However, this river Gomti is not the same as the Gomti River, which is a tributary of Ganga River. The legendary city of Dvārakā was the dwelling place of Krishna. It is generally believed that due to damage and destruction by the sea, Dvārakā was submerged six times, and modern-day Dwarka is the 7th such city to be built in the area.

=== Badrinath ===
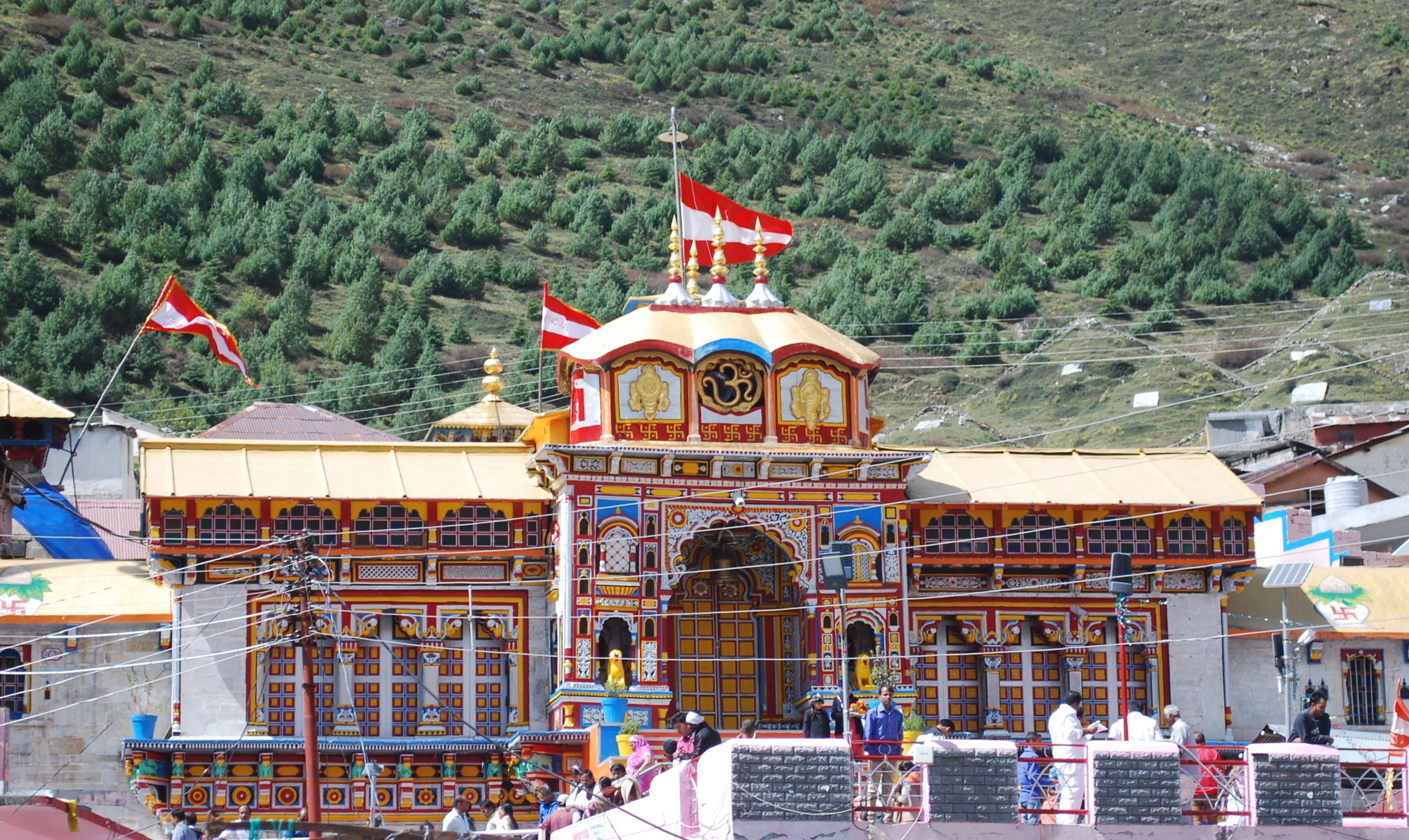
Badrinath Temple

Badrinath is located in the Chamoli district of Uttarakhand at an altitude of 3,133 meters (10,279 feet). The temple of Badrinath is dedicated to Vishnu.

== Chota Char Dham ==
Another circuit of four ancient pilgrimage sites in the Indian state of Uttarakhand is referred to as Chota Char Dham to differentiate it from this bigger circuit of Char Dham sites. It consists of Yamunotri, Gangotri, Kedarnath, and Badrinath. The Chota Char Dham shrines are closed over winter due to snowfall and reopen for pilgrims with the advent of summer.

=== Winter Char Dham ===
The Uttarakhand government is promoting a ‘Winter Char Dham’ initiative to boost tourism during the off-season. During winter, the traditional Chota Char Dhams are closed and the deities are relocated to nearby villages for worship. The Winter Char Dhams are the winter abodes of deities from the main Dhams: Omkareshwar Temple in Ukhimath for Kedarnath, Pandukeshwar in Chamoli for Badrinath, Mukhba in Uttarkashi for Gangotri Dham, and Kharsali for Yamunotri.
