= Nara-Narayana =

Hindu divine sages

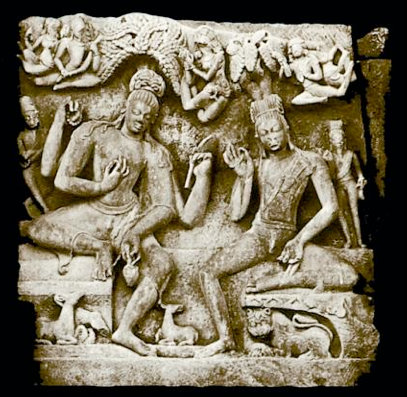
- Narayana on the left and Nara on the right, Deogarh, Uttar Pradesh, ca. 5th century AD
- Affiliation: Vaishnavism; Vishnu; Arjuna
- Abode: Badrinath
- Parents: Dharma (father), Murti (mother)

Naranarayana (Sanskrit: नरनारायण, romanized: Naranārāyaṇa), also rendered Nara-Narayana, are a pair of sage-brothers in Hinduism. They are generally regarded as partial-incarnation (aṃśa-avatara) of the preserver deity Vishnu on earth. Nara-Narayana are described as the sons of Dharma and Murti.

The Hindu scripture Mahabharata identifies Arjuna with Nara, and Krishna with Narayana. The legend of Nara-Narayana is also told in the scripture Bhagavata Purana. Hindus believe that the pair dwells at Badrinath, where their most important temple is located.

== Etymology ==
The name "Nara-Narayana" can be broken into two Sanskrit terms, Nara and Narayana. Nara means 'male being', and Narayana refers to the name of the deity Vishnu.

The Monier-Williams dictionary also defines Nara as "the primeval Man or eternal Spirit pervading the universe always associated with Narayana, 'son of the primeval man'; in [Epic] poetry, they are the sons of Dharma by Murti or Ahimsa, and emanations of Vishnu, Arjuna being identified with Nara, and Krishna with Narayana".

== Iconography ==
Nara-Narayana are depicted jointly or separately in images. When depicted separately, Nara is portrayed with two hands and wearing deer skin, while Narayana is shown on the right in the usual form of Vishnu. Nara is depicted as fair-complexioned, while Narayana is depicted with a dark complexion. In a symbolic interpretation, Nara represents humanity and Narayana represents God or supreme consciousness, understood as humanity's inner soul and ultimate goal.

== Legend ==
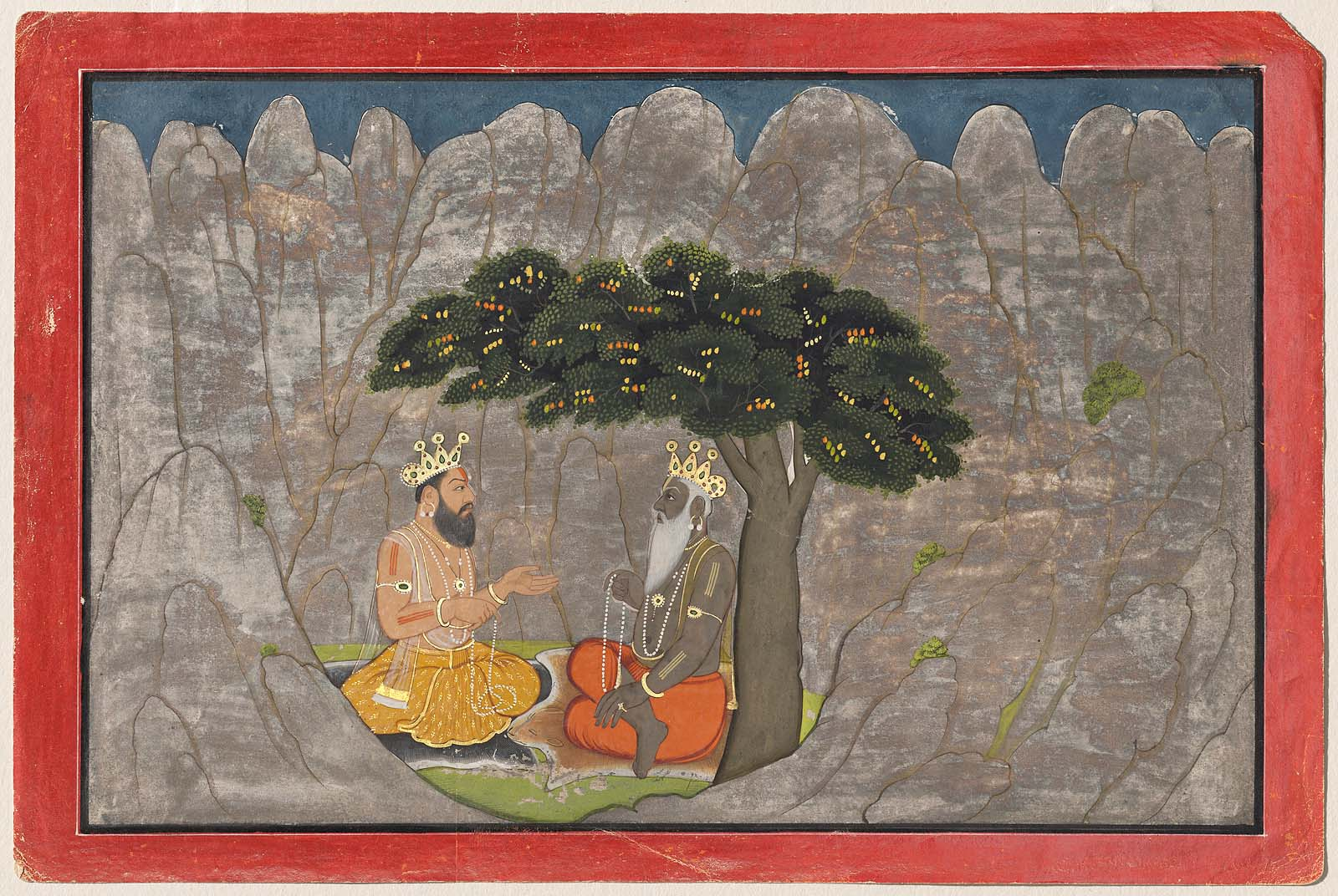
Nara and Narayana performing tapas

=== Birth ===
According to the Vamana Purana, Nara-Narayana were sons of Dharma, the son of Brahma and his wife Murti (daughter of Daksha), or Ahimsa.

They helped defeat the demons in the Churning of the Milky Ocean and Nara was given the elixir for safeguarding by Indra. They lived in Badrinath, where they performed tapas for a thousand years.

=== Birth of Urvashi ===
The Bhagavata Purana narrates Urvashi's birth from the sages Nara-Narayana. Once, the sages Nara-Narayana were meditating in the holy shrine of Badrinath situated in the Himalayas. Their penances and austerities alarmed the devas, and so Indra, the King of the devas, sent Kamadeva, Rati, Vasanta (spring), and various apsaras (nymphs) such as Menaka and Rambha to inspire them with erotic passion, and disturb their devotions. The sage Narayana took a flower and placed it on his thigh. Immediately, a beautiful nymph sprang forth. whose charms far excelled those of the apsaras, causing them to return to heaven filled with shame and vexation. Narayana sent this nymph to Indra with the apsaras. Since she been produced from the thigh (Ūru in Sanskrit) of the sage, she was called Urvashi. Having sent back the apsaras, the divine sages continued to meditate.

=== Conflict with Shiva ===
According to the Mahabharata, Shiva's trishula, after laying waste to Daksha's yajna, travelled to the Badarikāśrama, where it pierced the chest of Narayana, who had been engaged in a penance. By the force of the utterance of the sound 'Hum', produced by Narayana, the trident was subsequently ejected from his chest and returned to Shiva, who was then determined to slay the sages. Nara is stated to have plucked a blade of grass from the earth, which became an axe, and discharged it towards the destroyer deity. Shiva is described to have broken this axe. In Shaiva tradition, the sage Narayana performed great penances at the holy spot of Badarikāśrama, propitiating Shiva, and becoming Brahman and invincible.

=== Badrinath ===
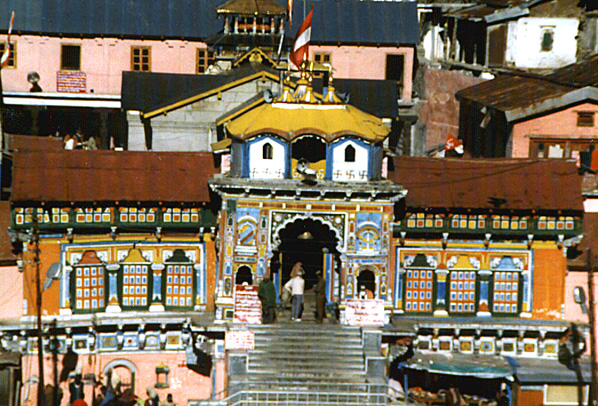
Badrinath temple

According to the Bhagavata Purana, "There in Badrikashram (Badrinath) the Personality of Godhead (Vishnu), in his incarnation as the sages Nara and Narayana, had been undergoing great penance since time immemorial for the welfare of all living entities." (3.4.22). It is mentioned in the Mahabharata and Puranas that Nara, representing the human soul, and Narayana, the divine lord, performed austerities on Mount Gandhamadana, in Badrinath. Two mountains in the Himalayas near Badrinath are named Nara and Narayana.

In Badrinath Temple's sanctorum, Nara and Narayana are next to Badri-Narayana.

=== Duel against Prahlada ===
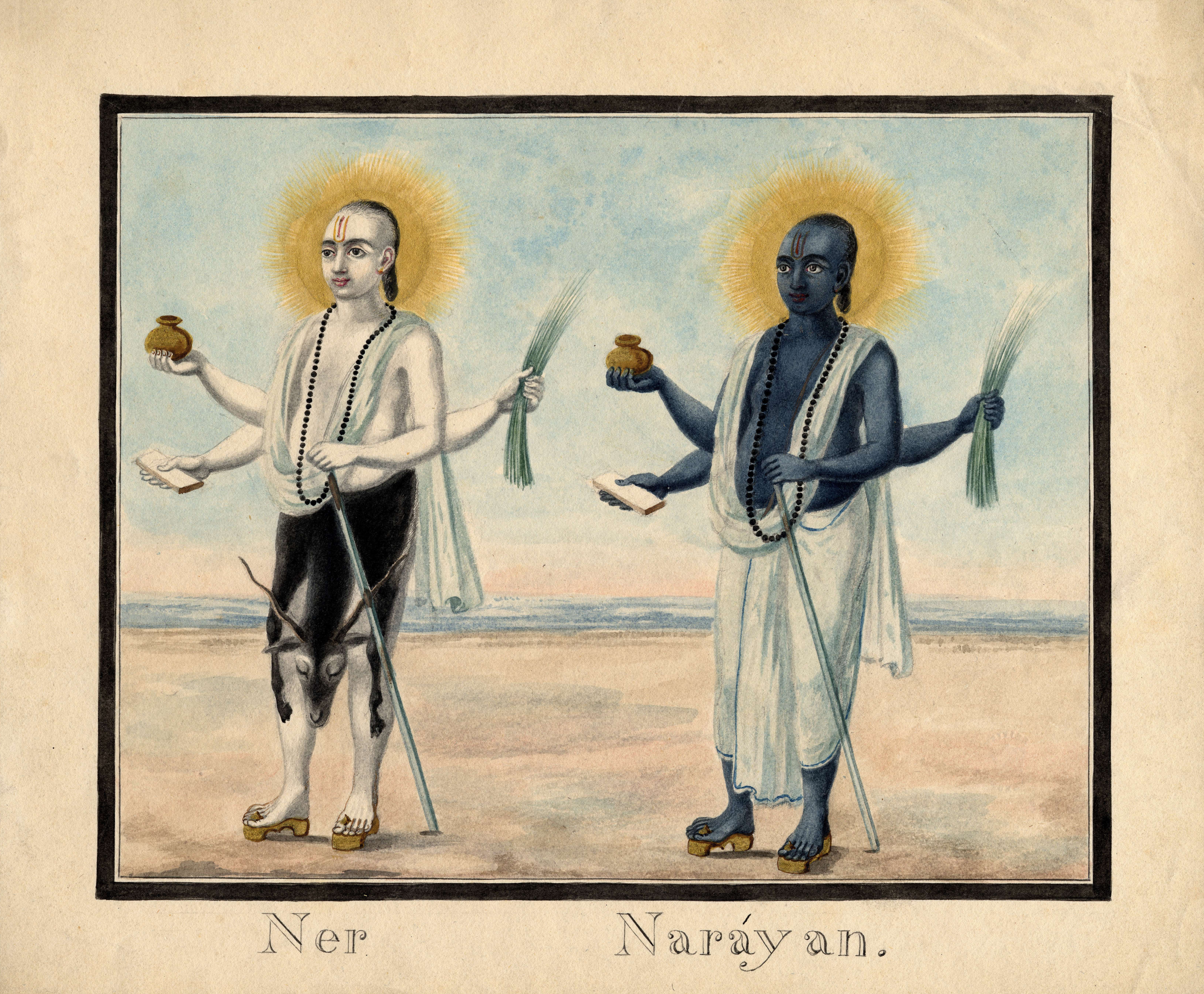
Watercolour painting of Nara and Narayana

Prahlada, the king of the asuras, once commanded his forces to accompany him to the holy tirtha of Naimiṣa, where he hoped to see a vision of Vishnu. They went hunting along the banks of the Sarasvati river. Prahlada observed two ascetics with matted hair, bearing the bows of Sharanga and Ajagava. The asura king asked them why they held weapons while performing a penance, and the two ascetics responded that all those who held power were righteous in their conduct. One of the rishis assured the king that none in the three worlds could conquer them in a duel. Prahlada rose to the challenge. Nara fired arrows upon the king with his Ajagava, but the latter was able to defeat him with his own gold-plated arrows. Prahlada employed the divine Brahmastra against Nara's Narayanastra. Seeing them neutralised in a mid-air collision, Prahlada wielded his mace against Narayana. His mace broke, and Prahlada found himself growing helpless, and sought Vishnu's assistance. Vishnu told his devotee that the Nara-Narayana brothers were invincible, as they were the sons of Yama, and could only be conquered in devotion rather than combat. The king left the regency to Andhaka, and erected an ashrama to propitiate Nara-Narayana, and apologised for his folly.

=== Arjuna-Krishna ===
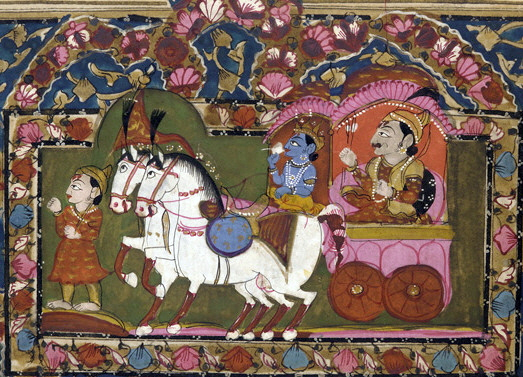
Krishna, Arjuna at Kurukshetra. Krishna gives the discourse of the Bhagavad Gita. 18-19th century painting.

Arjuna and Krishna are often referred to as Nara-Narayana in the Mahabharata, and are also considered reincarnations of Nara and Narayana respectively, according to the Devi Bhagavata Purana.

According to Bhandarkar, the deities of Nara-Narayana must have been very popular at the time of the composition of the Mahabharata, since in the opening stanzas of various parvas (constituent books) of the epic, obeisance is made to these two devas. In Vana Parva (12. 46, 47), Krishna says to Arjuna, "O invincible one, you are Nara and I am Hari Narayana, and we, the sages Nara-Narayana, have come to this world at the proper time.." In the same Parva, chapter 40 (verse 1); Shiva says to Arjuna — "In former birth you were Nara and with Narayana as your companion, performed austerities for thousands of years at Badari".

The Mahabharata suggests that by saluting Krishna (the omniscient Narayana), his friend and the highest of all male beings Arjuna, Saraswati, and Vyasa, the orator, and destroying demonic possessions, and conquering the conscience, one should recite the epic Mahabharata.
