= Nar Parvat =

Mountain peak

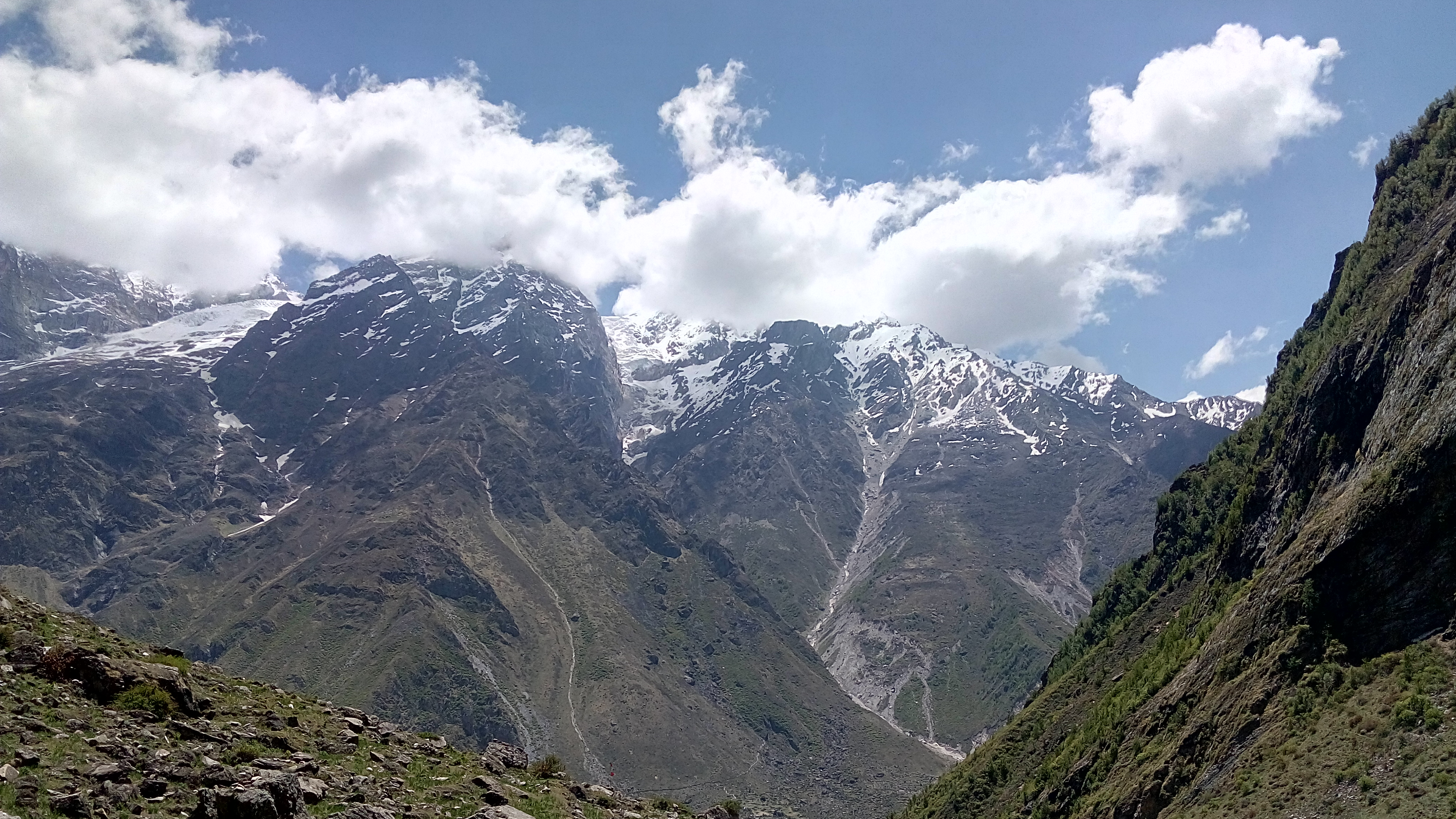
- Nar Parvat, a view from Badrinath on 2 June 2017

Highest point
- Elevation: 5,855 m (19,209 ft)
- Prominence: 871 m (2,858 ft)
- Coordinates: 30°44′26″N 79°33′03″E

Geography
- Location within India Location within Uttarakhand
- Location: Uttarakhand

Climbing
- First ascent: No records

Nar Parvat is a mountain peak located at 5,855 m (19,209 ft) above sea level in the state of Uttarakhand in India and the prominence is 871 m (2,858 ft).

== Location ==
The peak is located in the north west of Valley of Flowers National Park and it separates the Badrinath valley from this valley. Also, Kshir Ganga originates from this mountain.
