= Pandukeshwar =

Village in Uttarakhand, India

- Village
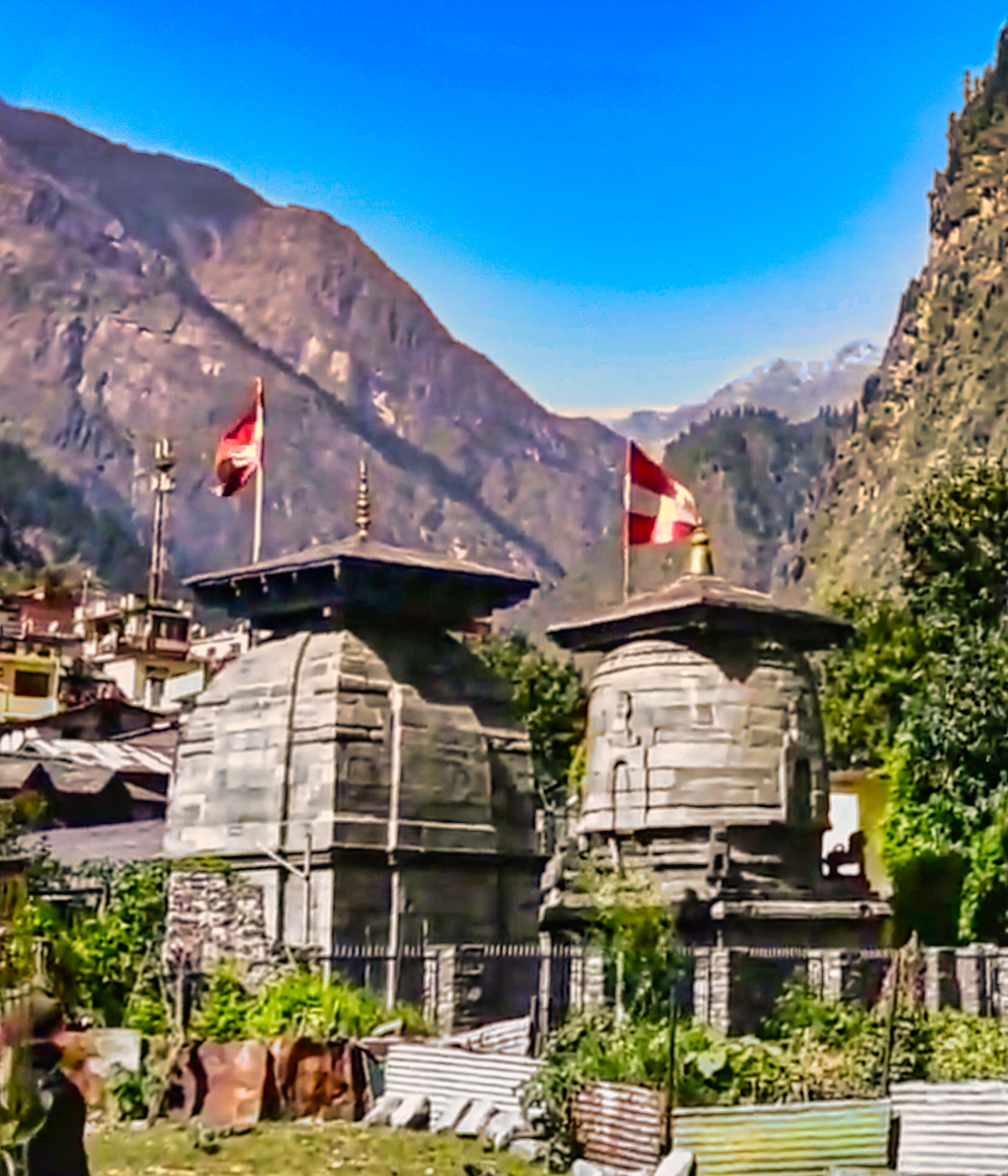
- Yogabadri (right) and Vasudeva-Badri (left) in Pandukeshwar, rear view

- Location in Uttarakhand, India
- Coordinates: 30.63323°N 79.55035°E
- Country: India
- State: Uttarakhand
- District: Chamoli
- Tehsil: Joshimath

Area
  - Total: 2.103 km^{2} (0.812 sq mi)

Population (2011)
  - Total: 1,396
  - Density: 663.8/km^{2} (1,719/sq mi)
- Time zone: UTC+5:30 (IST)

Pandukeshwar (Pāṇḍukeśvar) is a village in Joshimath block of Chamoli district, Uttarakhand. Located in a gorge near the headwaters of the Alaknanda River, just south of Badrinath, Pandukeshwar is the uppermost settlement in the valley to be inhabited year-round. During the winter, when the Badrinath Temple is closed, its idol of Vishnu is relocated to the Yogabadri Temple in Pandukeshwar. The Yogabadri Temple is one of four early medieval shrines at Pandukeshwar, and is unique for being built in the Dravidian architectural style despite being high in the Himalayas. As of 2011, Pandukeshwar had a population of 1,396, in 312 households.

== Geography ==
Pandukeshwar is located high in the Himalayas, in the uppermost valley of the Alaknanda River, in a gorge near its glacial source. It is historically the northernmost settlement on the Alaknanda to be inhabited year-round; Badrinath to the north is only inhabited seasonally. To the north, past Badrinath, the Mana Pass connects to the high Tibetan Plateau. Just south of Pandukeshwar is the town of Joshimath. Even today, Pandukeshwar is remote and hard to reach, with heavy snowfall often blocking access in the winter and "flash floods and landslides triggered by cloudbursts periodically prevent[ing] visitors from reaching the village at other times of year."

== History ==
Four copper-plate inscriptions are known from Pandukeshwar, with one dated to either December 853 or September 854 and two others believed to be from the early 900s. The 853/54 inscription records the grant of various villages' revenues to the temple of Narayana at a village called Garuḍāgrāma, along with instructions for the priests at Garuḍāgrāma to provide assistance to brahmacharis "attached to the tapovana belonging to Badarikāśrama" (Badrinath). Nachiket Chanchani suggests that Garuḍāgrāma was the name of Pandukeshwar at the time, and that Pandukeshwar, given its position just below the famous sacred site of Badrinath, likely "historically occupied a subordinate position to Badrinath and was named for Garuda, Vishnu's loyal assistant".

== Temples ==
Four early medieval stone temples exist today at Pandukeshwar. One, dedicated to Vishnu in his form as Yogabadri, is built in the Dravidian architectural style typical of Southern India; the other three — one to Vishnu in his form as Vasudeva Badri, one to Lakshmi-Narayana, and one to Ganesha — are built in the Nagara architectural style typical of Northern India. Pandukeshwar is the only place in Northern India where historical examples of both Dravida and Nagara architecture can be seen side by side; the nearest places where such a combination can be found are Badami and Pattadakal, both in Karnataka.

The Yogabadri temple is "the biggest and most important monument in the village", and the only Dravida-style temple in the central Himalayan region. It is dated by Nachiket Chanchani to c. 850-1000 CE. It faces the mountain road leading to Badrinath and features a garbagriha crowned by a tall cylindrical dome, with lions at the four corners of the dome's base, symbolically protecting the temple. In the garbagriha is a golden sculpture image of Vishnu in the lotus position, or padmāsana. This image probably dates from around the temple's original construction in the 9th or 10th century. At the four corners of the garbagriha's foundation are four makaras. In front of the garbagriha is a rectangualar mandapa, which is connected to the garbagriha in the rear. The mandapa's original stone-slab roofing is still in place, although it is now covered by copper sheet cladding.

Each winter, the Yogabadri temple gains in importance because the Badrinath Temple closes at the start of winter, and its image of Vishnu is brought down to Pandukeshwar in a palanquin. The image is then kept in the garbagriha of the Yogabadri temple, where pilgrims worship it until the image is brought back up to the Badrinath Temple when it reopens for the summer.

To the left of the Yogabadri temple is the a Nagara-style temple enshrining Vishnu as Narayana (not the same as the Lakshmi-Narayana temple), which according to Chanchani was probably originally built in the 10th or 11th century and was probably intentionally paired with the Yogabadri temple. Like the Yogabadri temple, the Narayana temple faces the road to Badrinath. The Narayana temple's latina-style shikhara has "mismatched stones, abnormal taper, and an abnormally large chattra", which according to Chanchani "all point to a [later] reconstruction".

The north-facing Lakshmi-Naryana temple is located near the Narayana temple; according to Chanchani, it probably dates from no earlier than the late 800s. Like the Narayana temple, it features a latina-style shikhara. Some decorative elements, such as "a row of diamond- and orb-shaped medallions" on one of its courses, indicate that its builders wanted to "visually [link] this temple to those already erected at Pandukeshwar". The Lakshmi-Naryana temple has been heavily rebuilt since its original construction, though, so relatively little can be said about its original design. According to Chanchani, the Lakshmi-Narayana temple does not appear in photographs dated prior to 2011; Chanchani reports conflicting accounts of its rebuilding, with some saying that it was previously buried under a pile of rubble and others saying that it was "concealed within a modern residence that has since been demolished".

Finally, the "diminutive" Ganesha shrine adjoins the Yogabadri temple, immediately to the left of its entrance.

The temples at Pandukeshwar are administered by Nambudiri Brahmins from Kerala.

== Demographics ==
As of 2011, Pandukeshwar had a population of 1,396, in 312 households. This population was 50.9% male (711) and 49.1% female (685). The 0–6 age group numbered 138 (67 male and 71 female), making up 9.9% of the total population. 217 residents were members of Scheduled Castes, or 15.5% of the total.

== Infrastructure ==
As of 2011, Pandukeshwar had 3 primary schools and 1 primary health sub centre. Drinking water was provided by tap and hand pump; there were no public toilets. The village had a sub post office but no public library; there was at least some access to electricity for residential and agricultural (but not commercial) purposes.
