= Hindu pilgrimage sites in India =

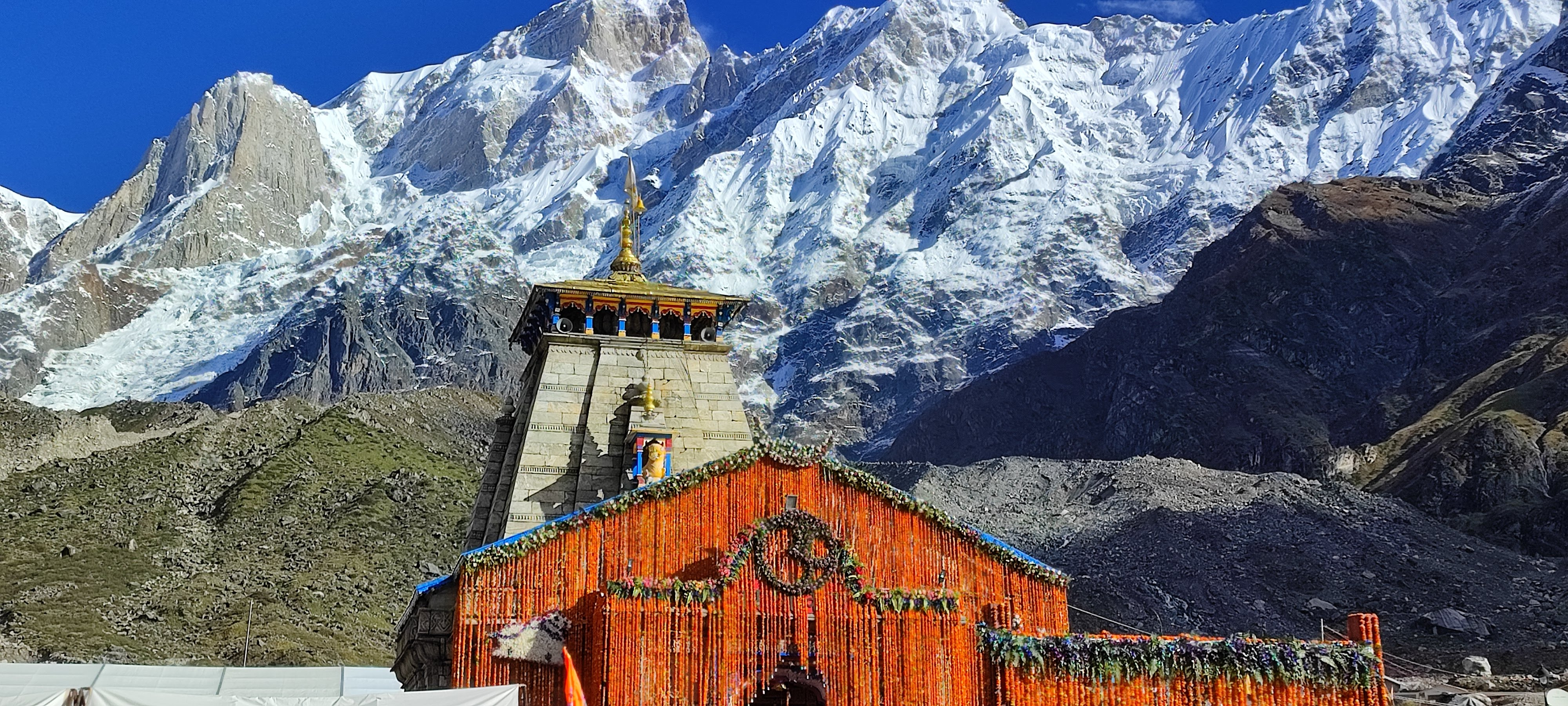
Kedarnath Temple in Himalayan Mountains, Uttarakhand

In Hinduism, the yatra (pilgrimage) to the tirthas (sacred places) has special significance for earning the punya (spiritual merit) needed to attain the moksha (salvation) by performing the darśana (viewing of deity), the parikrama (circumambulation), the yajna (sacrificial fire offering), the Dhyana (spiritual contemplation), the puja (worship), the prarthana (prayer, which could be in the form of mantra – sacred chants, bhajan – prayer singing, or kirtan – collective musical prayer performance), the dakshina (alms and donation for worthy cause), the seva (selfless service towards community, devotees or temple), the bhandara (running volunteer community kitchen for pilgrims), etc. These sacred places are usually located on the banks of sacred waters, such as sacred rivers or their tributaries (among the rigvedic rivers of sapta sindhu the trio ganges-yamuna-saraswati are considered most sacred), the kundas (pond or lake, among these the Lake Manasarovar is considered most scared), the ghats (water bodies with stairs such as Ghats in Varanasi), or the stepwells (among these the rani ki vav in the form of inverted temple is considered most spectacular), or the temple tanks.

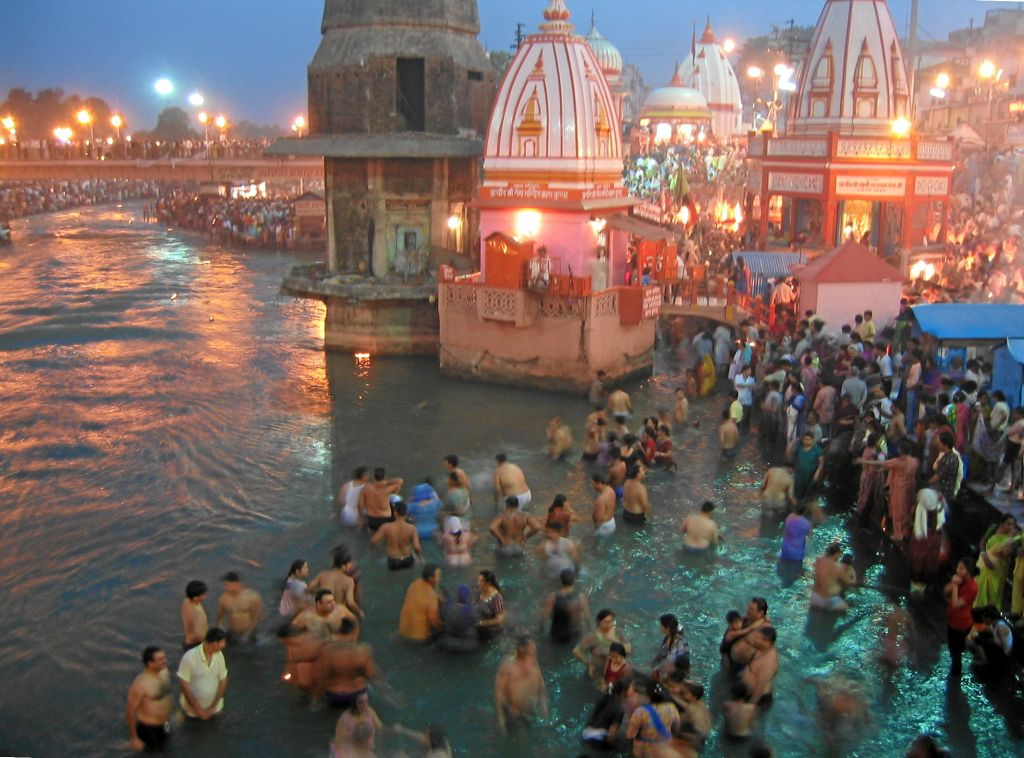
Evening prayers at Ganga river (Har-Ki-Pauri) in Haridwar

In India there are 7 Sapta Puri holy cities, 4 Dhams (Char Dham) and 12 Jyotirlings devoted to the Lord Shiva, 51 Shakta pithas devoted to the feminine manifestation of the god, the eight swayambhu Vishnu temples (Badrinath, Naimisharanya, Saligram Muktinath, Srimushnam, Tiruchirappalli, Tirupati, Nanguneri, Pushkar) and the important Lord Rama circuit (Ayodhya, Chitrakoot, Hampi and Rameswaram) and Lord Krishna circuit (Braj, Kurukshetra and Dwarka).

- Holy Places: Himalayan Chota Char Dham – Badrinath, Kedarnath, Gangotri, and Yamunotri, Varanasi, Prayagraj, Haridwar – Rishikesh, Mathura – Vrindavan, Ayodhya, Dwarka, Rameswaram, Shirdi, Tirupati, Nashik, Pancharama Kshetras.
- Holy Fairs: The Kumbh Mela (the "pitcher festival") is one of the holiest of Hindu pilgrimages that is held four times every twelve years; the location is rotated among the four cities of Prayagraj, Haridwar, Nashik, and Ujjain. The Mahamaham in temple town of Kumbakonam is also celebrated once in 12 years. Annual Gita Mahotsav at Kurukshetra, Shravani Mela at Deoghar, and Pitrapaksha Mela at Gaya are also notable holy fairs.
- Holy Temples: the Char Dham, Pancharama Kshetras, Rameswaram, Dwarka, Puri and Badrinath; the Pancha Bhoota Stalam; the eight Ashta Veeratta Sthalams; the Six Abodes of Murugan; the five Pancha Sabhai; the 108 Divya Desams; Katra, home to the Vaishno Devi temple; Puri home to Vaishnava Jagannath temple and Rath Yatra celebration; Tirumala – Tirupati, home to the Tirumala Venkateswara Temple; Shirdi, home to Sai Baba of Shirdi; Sabarimala home to Swami Ayyappan; the Shakta pithas; the twelve Jyotirlingas; the seven Sapta Puri.
- Cities Celebrated in Literature: 276 Paadal Petra Sthalams, 108 Shiva Temples established by Paraśurāma.
- Holy Deity : Kuladaivat Hindu families have their own family patron deity. This deity is common to a lineage, a clan or a locality.
- Samadhis (shrines) of Saints: Alandi, Samadhi of Dnyaneshwar:Mantralayam, Shri Sai baba temple, Shirdi – Shri Samadhi Mandir of Sri Sai Baba of Shirdi at Shirdi, samadhi of Raghavendra Tirtha, Belur Math which enshrine that Holy remains of Sri Ramakrishna, Sri Sarada Devi, Swami Vivekananda Puri, and other direct Disciples of Sri Ramakrishna, Tulsi Ghat, Varanasi where Saint Tulsidas left his mortal coil, Samadhi Mandir of Meher Baba in Meherabad, Samadhi Mandir of Saint Kabir at Gorakhpur, near Varanasi, Panchaganga Ghat, Varanasi where Trailanga Swami lived and left his mortal body, Karar Ashram, Puri where Swami Sri Yukteswar Giri, attained the Mahasamadhi.
- All the tirth places which are important in Hinduism is mentioned below. Madhva saint Vadiraja Tirtha of sixteenth century has written Tirtha Prabandha a document on travelogue of pilgrimage centres throughout India.

== Most visited pilgrimage sites ==
=== Ayodhya Ram Janmabhoomi ===
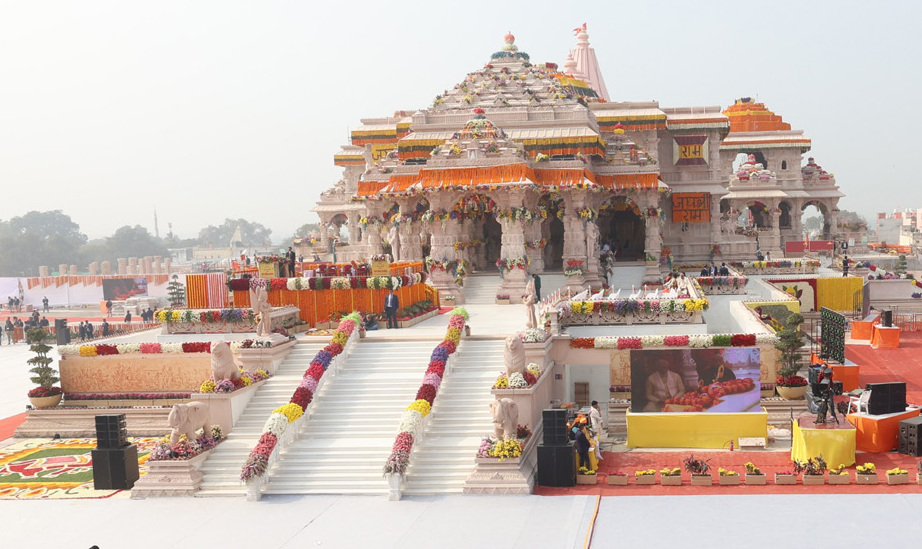
Ram Janmbhoomi Mandir, Ayodhya Dham

Ayodhya is an ancient holy city in Uttar Pradesh, which is one of the seven holy Hindu Saptapuri cites, and considered the home to Ram Janmabhoomi, the birthplace of Rama, in Hindu tradition. The Ram Mandir in Ayodhya, India is a Hindu temple, that was inaugurated on 22 January 2024 after a prana pratishtha (consecration) ceremony. Ayodhya's Ram temple is estimated to have 50 million visitors per year, making it possibly the top pilgrimage site in the world.

=== Kashi Vishwanath (Varanasi) ===
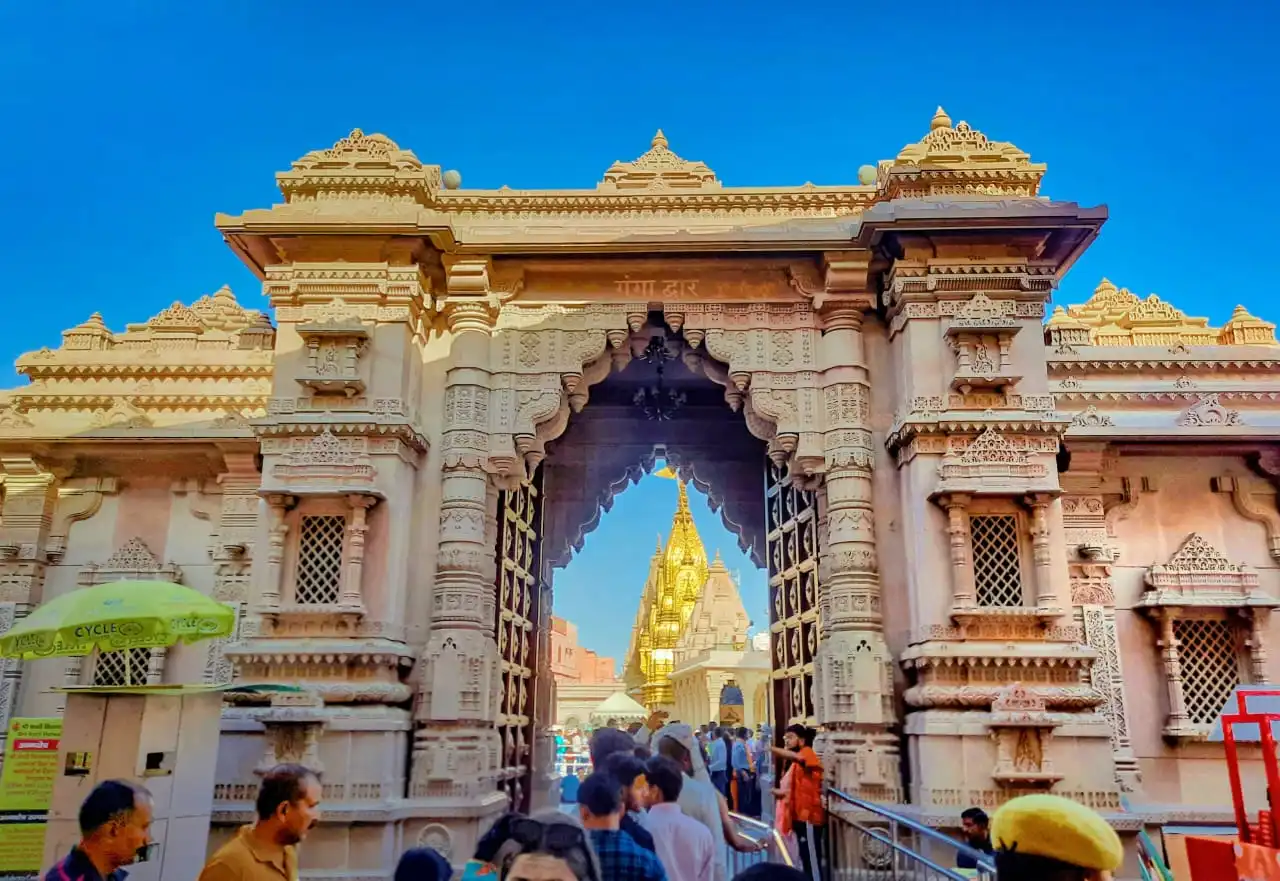
Kashi Vishwanath Temple, Varanasi (Ganga Dwar)

Kashi Vishwanath Temple is Hindu temple dedicated to Shiva located in the ancient holy city of Varanasi, Uttar Pradesh, India. The temple is a prominent Hindu pilgrimage site, and is one of the twelve Jyotirlinga shrines. The presiding deity is known by the names Vishwanath and Vishweshwara (IAST: Viśvanātha and Viśveśvara), literally meaning "Lord of the Universe". The temple has been managed by a board of trustees set up by the government of Uttar Pradesh since 1983. On 1 January 2023, a record 3.35 lakh pilgrims visited the temple. In the month of January 2023, the temple received approximately 45,000 visitors per day.

=== Jagannath Dham (Puri) ===
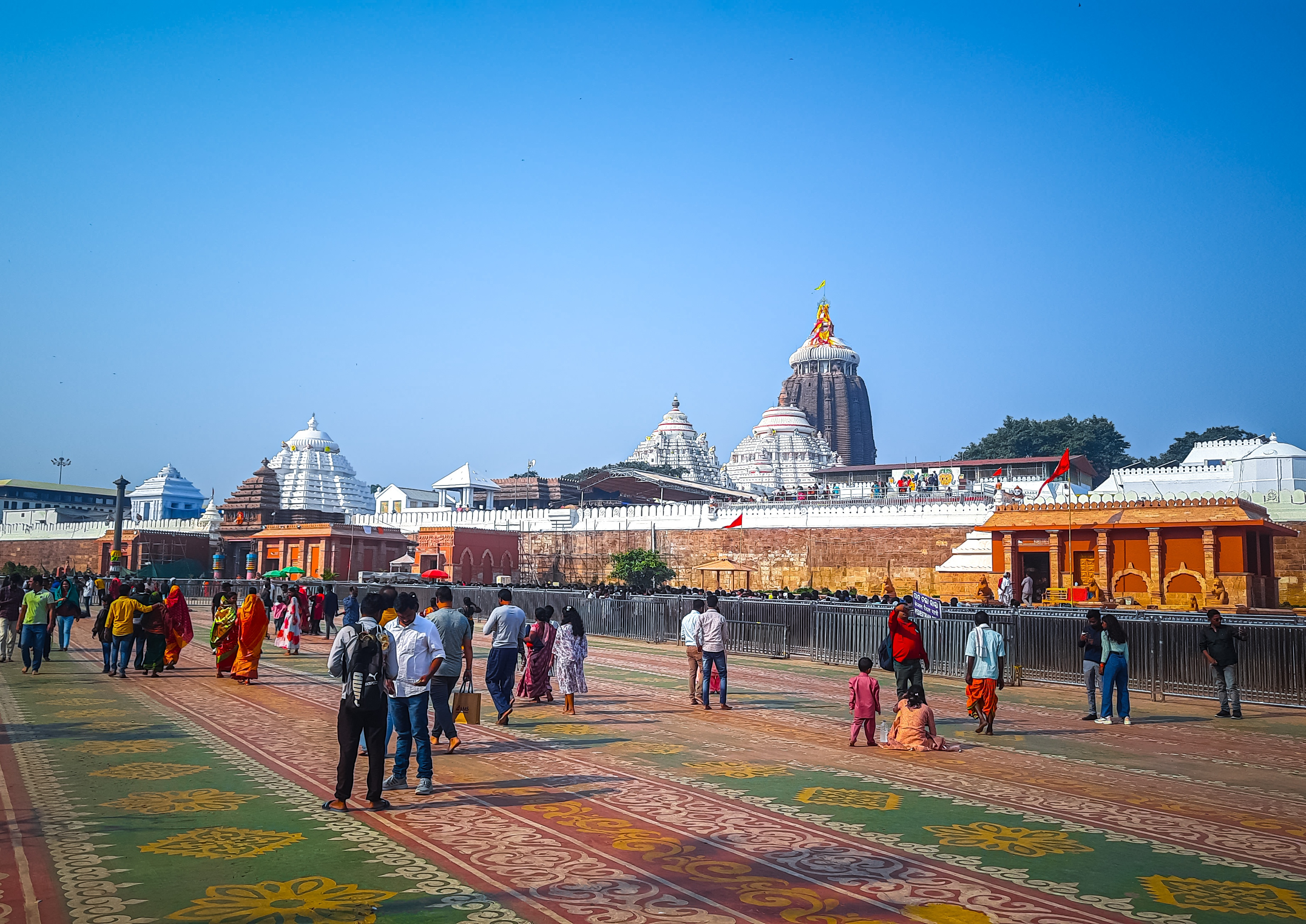
Jagannath Temple

Jagannath Temple, Puri is one of the most sacred sites in Hinduism, located in the township of Puri in Odisha.The Hindu temple is dedicated to the god Jagannath, a form of Vishnu and two of his siblings, Balaram and Subhadra, alongside Sudarshan (the deified form of Vishnu's primary weapon).

=== Tirupati Balaji (Venkateswara Temple, Tirumala) ===
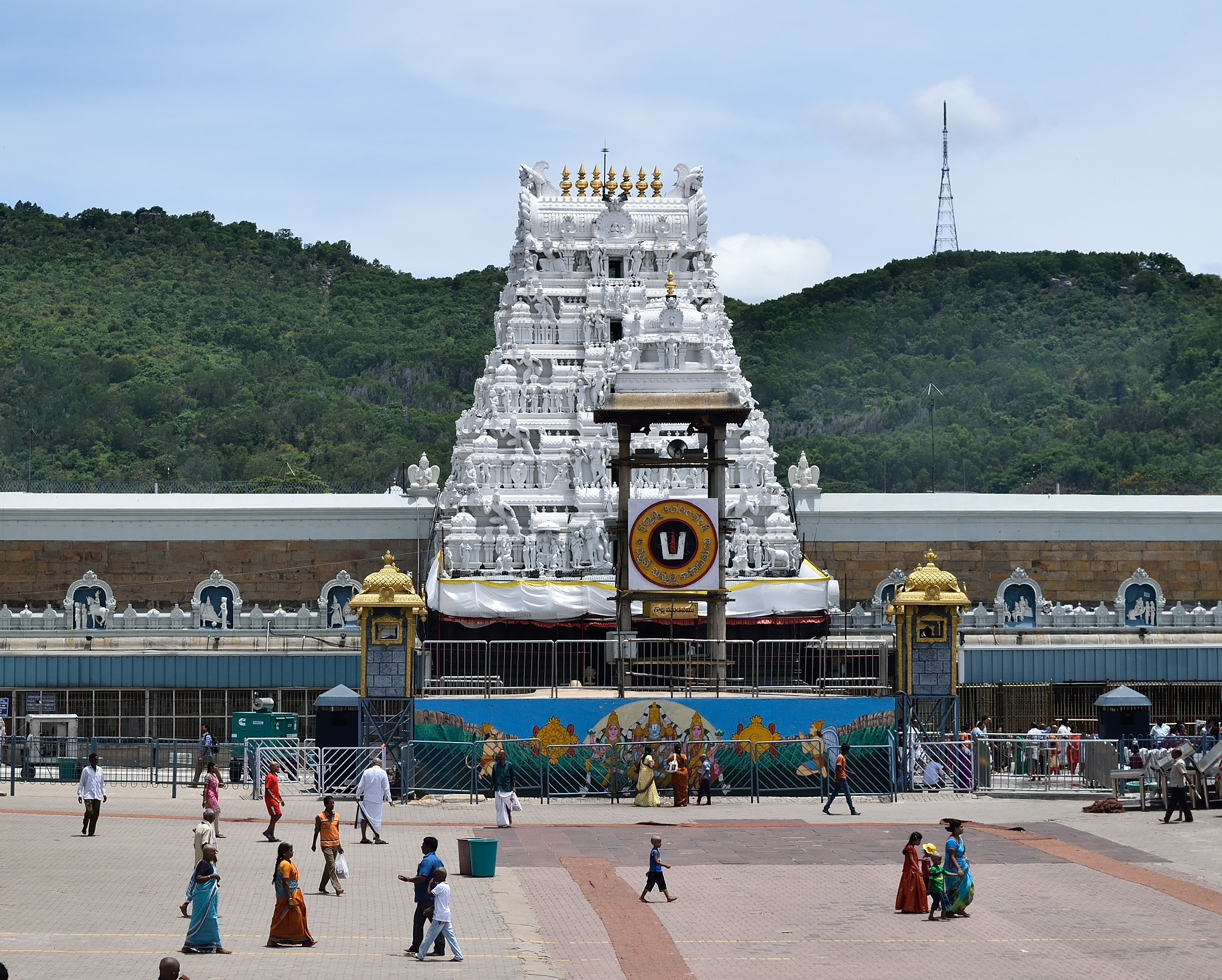
Tirumala Venkateswara temple entrance

Venkateswara Temple, Tirumala, also known as Tirupati Balaji Temple, is a Hindu temple situated in the hills of Tirumala at Tirupati in Tirupati district of Andhra Pradesh, India. The temple is dedicated to Venkateswara, a form of Vishnu, who is believed to have appeared on the earth to save mankind from the trials and troubles of Kali Yuga. Venkateswara is known by many other names: Balaji, Govinda, and Srinivasa. The temple is run by Tirumala Tirupati Devasthanams (TTD), under the Andhra Pradesh Government. The head of TTD is appointed by the Andhra Pradesh Government. The temple is one of the Pancha Kshethram where Maha Lakshmi was born as Bhargavi - the daughter of Maharishi Bhrigu. The other four temples of the Pancha Kshethram are Sarangapani temple, Kumbakonam, Oppiliappan temple, Nachiyar Koil and Sundararaja Perumal Temple, Salem. Tirumala hills are part of Seshachalam Hills range. The hills are 853 metres (2,799 ft) above sea level and comprise seven peaks, representing the seven heads of Adisesha. The temple lies on the seventh peak—Venkatadri, on the southern banks of Sri Swami Pushkarini, a holy water tank. Hence the temple is also referred to as "Temple of Seven Hills". The temple is visited by 50,000 to 100,000 devotees per day and reaching 30 to 40 million visitors annually who come to pray to Lord Venkateshwara.

=== Sri Sai Baba Temple (Shirdi) ===
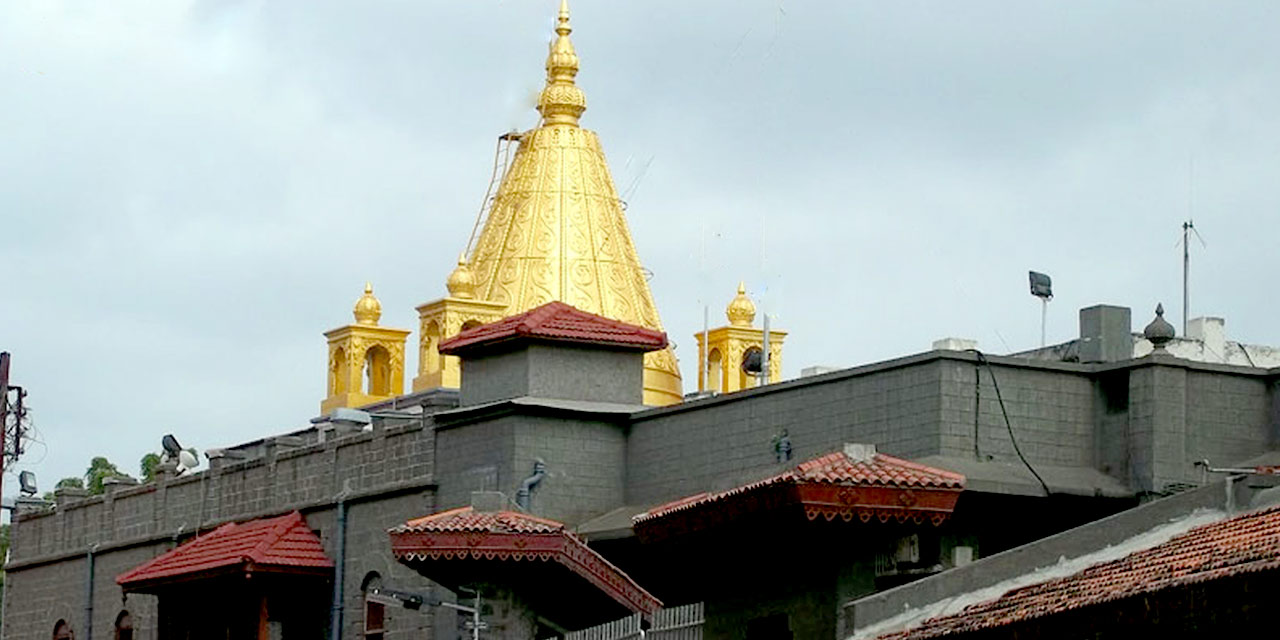
Sri Sai Baba Temple, Shirdi

Shri Sai Baba Temple, Shirdi, also known as Sri Sai Baba Samadhi Mandir and Sai Baba of Shirdi temple, is a temple which is located in holy city town of Shirdi, Maharashtra is among the top pilgrimage sites of the world.Sai Baba of Shirdi,also known as Shirdi Sai Baba, was an Indian spiritual master and fakir, considered to be a saint, revered by devotees during and after his lifetime.Hindu devotees believed to be an incarnation of the Hindu deity Dattatreya.The temple is a shrine which was constructed in 1922. Shirdi Sai Baba temple is approximately 200 kilometers from Mumbai City. Also, this temple is known to be the second richest temple in India where millions of pilgrims visit daily. Shirdi is frequented by devotees and tourists. The temple is managed by the Sri Saibaba Sansthan Trust. The temple is visited by more than 60,000 per day and the number can increase by up by 2 to 3 lakh on special occasions.

=== Vaishno Devi Temple (Jammu) ===
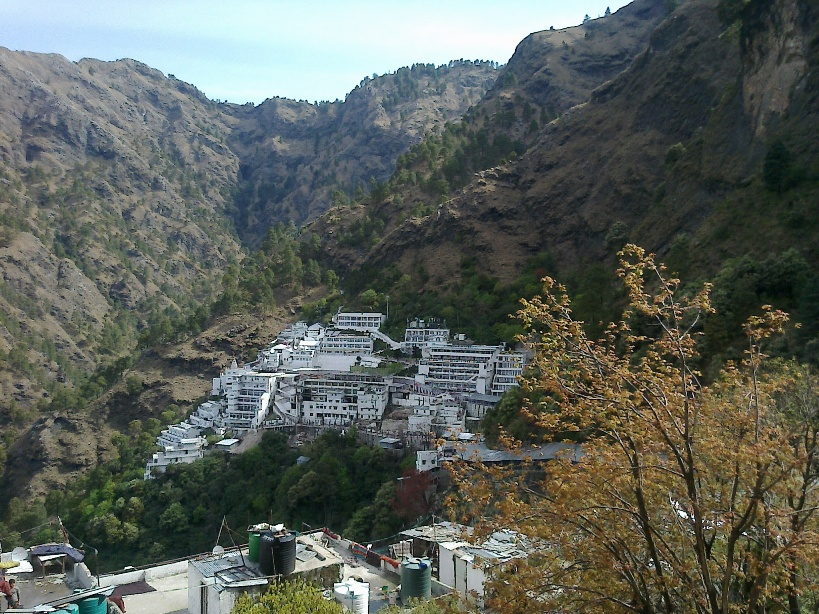
Mata Vaishno Devi Temple, Jammu

Vaishno Devi Temple, also known as the Shri Mata Vaishno Devi Temple and Vaishno Devi Bhavan, is a Hindu temple located in Katra, Jammu and Kashmir, dedicated to Vaishno Devi, a manifestation of Durga. It is located on the Trikuta Mountain at 5,000 feet. The Shakti tradition considers it to be a Shakta pitha. The temple is governed by the Shri Mata Vaishno Devi Shrine Board (SMVDSB) and has been chaired by the Governor of Jammu and Kashmir since August 1986. Millions of devotees visit the temple annually. In 2018, the Vaishno Devi shrine reported that it had received 8.5 million pilgrims that year.

== List of Important Pilgrimage Places ==
Place	State	Importance
Ayodhya	Uttar Pradesh	Saptapuri
Dwarka	Gujarat	Saptapuri
Haridwar	Uttarakhand	Saptapuri
Kanchipuram	Tamil Nadu	Saptapuri
Mathura	Uttar Pradesh	Saptapuri
Ujjain	Madhya Pradesh	Saptapuri
Varanasi	Uttar Pradesh	Saptapuri
Haridwar	Uttarakhand	Kumbh Mela
Nashik	Maharashtra	Kumbh Mela
Prayagraj	Uttar Pradesh	Kumbh Mela
Ujjain	Madhya Pradesh	Kumbh Mela
Badrinath Temple	Uttarakhand	Char Dham
Dwarkadhish Temple	Gujarat	Char Dham
Jagannath Temple	Odisha	Char Dham
Ramanathaswamy Temple	Tamil Nadu	Char Dham, 12 Jyotirlinga
Bhimashankar Temple	Maharashtra/ Odisha	12 Jyotirlinga
Baidyanath Temple	Jharkhand	12 Jyotirlinga
Trimbakeshwar Temple	Maharashtra	12 Jyotirlinga
Grishneshwar Temple	Maharashtra	12 Jyotirlinga
Omkareshwar Temple	Madhya Pradesh	12 Jyotirlinga
Somnath Temple	Gujarat	12 Jyotirlinga
Nageshvara Temple	Gujarat	12 Jyotirlinga
Kedarnath Temple	Uttarakhand	12 Jyotirlinga
Vishwanath Temple	Uttar Pradesh	12 Jyotirlinga
Mahakaleshwar Temple	Madhya Pradesh	12 Jyotirlinga, Astadasha Maha Shakta pitha
Mallikarjuna Temple	Andhra Pradesh	12 Jyotirlinga, Astadasha Maha Shakta pitha
Shrinkhala Temple, Pandua	West Bengal	Astadasha Maha Shakta pitha
Mangla Gauri Temple, Gaya	Bihar	Astadasha Maha Shakta pitha
Ekvira Temple, Mahur	Maharashtra	Astadasha Maha Shakta pitha
Biraja Temple, Jajpur	Odisha	Astadasha Maha Shakta pitha
Alopi Devi Temple, Prayagraj	Uttar Pradesh	Astadasha Maha Shakta pitha
Kukkuteswara Temple, Pithapuram	Andhra Pradesh	Astadasha Maha Shakta pitha
Shri Sai Baba Temple, Shirdi	Maharashtra	Sai Baba of Shirdi
Bhimeswara Temple, Draksharamam	Andhra Pradesh	Astadasha Maha Shakta pitha
Jawalamukhi, Kangra	Himachal Pradesh	Astadasha Maha Shakta pitha
Mahalakshmi Temple, Kolhapur	Maharashtra	Astadasha Maha Shakta pitha
Jogulamba Temple, Alampur	Telangana	Astadasha Maha Shakta pitha
Kamakshi Amman Temple, Kanchipuram	Tamil Nadu	Astadasha Maha Shakta pitha
Vishalakshi Temple, Varanasi	Uttar Pradesh	Astadasha Maha Shakta pitha
Chamundeshwari Temple, Mysuru	Karnataka	Astadasha Maha Shakta pitha
Sharada Peeth, Neelam	POK	Astadasha Maha Shakta pitha
Vimala Temple, Puri	Odisha	Adi Shakta pitha
Tara Tarini Temple, Ganjam	Odisha	Adi Shakta pitha
Kamakhya Temple, Guwahati	Assam	Adi Shakta pitha
Kalighat Kali Temple, Kolkata	West Bengal	Adi Shakta pitha
Janai Malai Satara		Swayambhu
Pushkar	Rajasthan	Swayambhu Vishnu
Naimisharanya		Swayambhu Vishnu
Tirupati		Swayambhu Vishnu
Srimushnam		Swayambhu Vishnu
Tiruchirappalli		Swayambhu Vishnu
Nanguneri		Swayambhu Vishnu
Muktinath, Nepal		Swayambhu Vishnu
Pashupati, Nepal		Shiva
Shikhar Shingnapur		Shiva
Narsobawadi		Narsimha Saraswati
Ganagapura		Narsimha Saraswati
Kudalasangama		Lingayat
Manikanagara		Manik Prabhu
Akkalkot		Swami Samartha
Kurvapur, Raichur		Sripad Vallabha
Hampi		Rama circuit
Nashik		Rama Circuit
Nabadwip	West Bengal	Chaitanya Mahaprabhu Gaudiya Vaishnavism circuit
Mayapur	West Bengal	Gaudiya Vaishnavism Circuit
Tarapith	West Bengal	Shakta pitha, Tarapith Temple. Also tantric seat of power along with Kamakya Temple
Attahas	West Bengal	Shakta pitha
Kankalitala	West Bengal	Shakta pitha
Dakshineswar Kali Temple	West Bengal	Siddhapitha, famous Kali Temple
Ekachakra	West Bengal	Gaudiya Vaishnavism Circuit
Juranpur Satipith	West Bengal	Shakta pitha
Kiriteswari Temple	West Bengal	Shakta pitha
Taraknath Temple	West Bengal	one of the 64 Jyotirlingas
Bargabhima Temple	West Bengal	Shakta pitha
Nandikeshwari Temple	West Bengal	Shakta pitha
Bahula Shakta pitha	West Bengal	Shakta pitha
Bahula Temple	West Bengal	Shakta pitha
Bakreshwar	West Bengal	Shakta pitha
Ujani Temple Burdwan	West Bengal	Shakta pitha
Bhramari Temple Jalpaiguri	West Bengal	Shakta pitha
Tripura Sundari Temple	Tripura	Shakta pitha
Ratnavali Temple	West Bengal	Shakta pitha
Kshirgram Jogadya Temple	West Bengal	Shakta pitha
Sarvamangala Temple, Purba Bardhaman district	West Bengal	Shakta pitha
Fullora Temple Labhpur	West Bengal	Shakta pitha
Kachua	West Bengal	Lokenath Baba Janmasthan
Baneswar Shiva temple	West Bengal	Shiva Temple
Jalpesh Temple	West Bengal	Shiva Temple
Shibnibas Nadia	West Bengal	Shiva Temple

== Haridwar-Rishikesh (Maya Puri) region ==
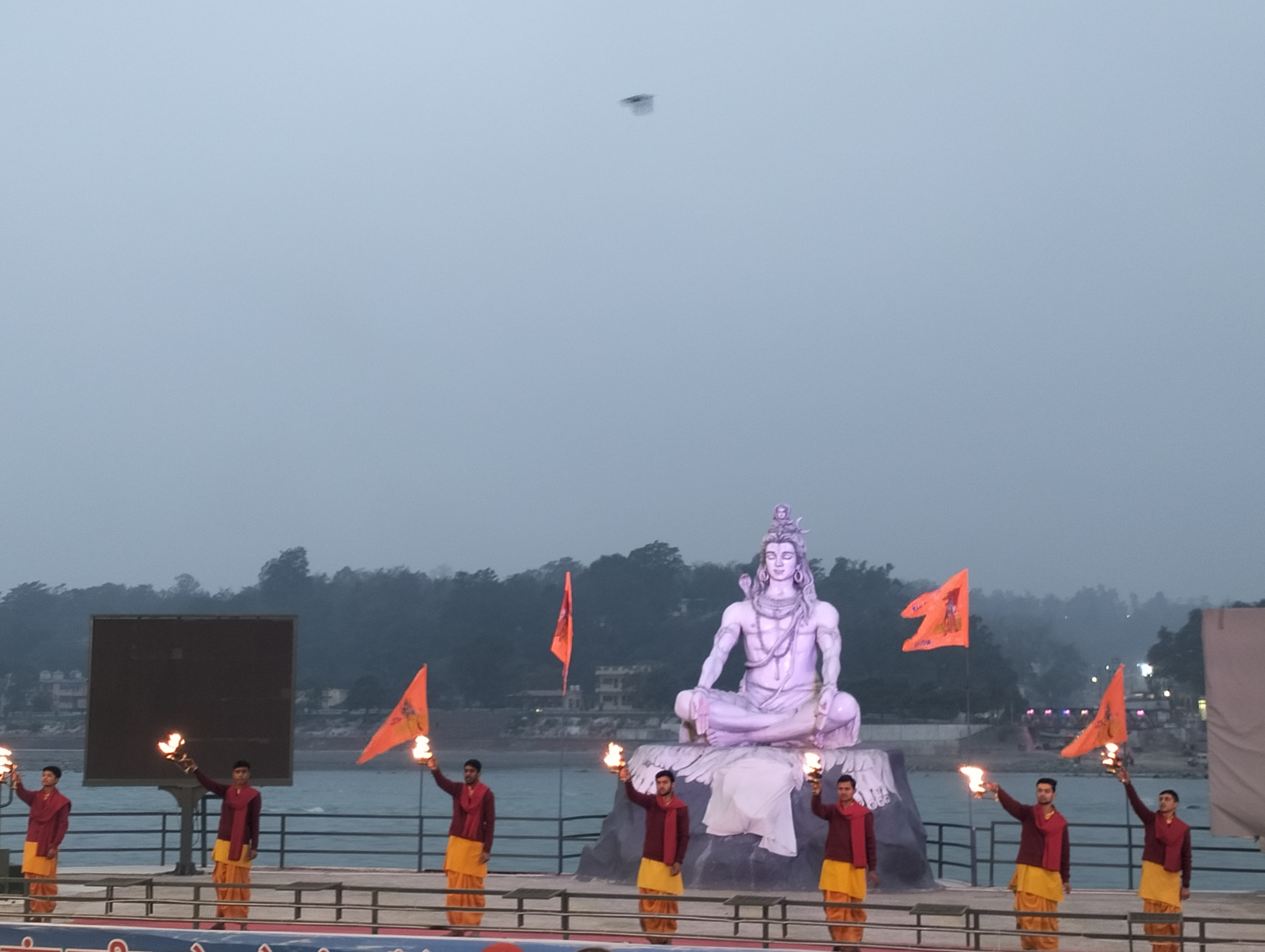
Ganga Aarti at Parmarath Niketan, Rishikesh

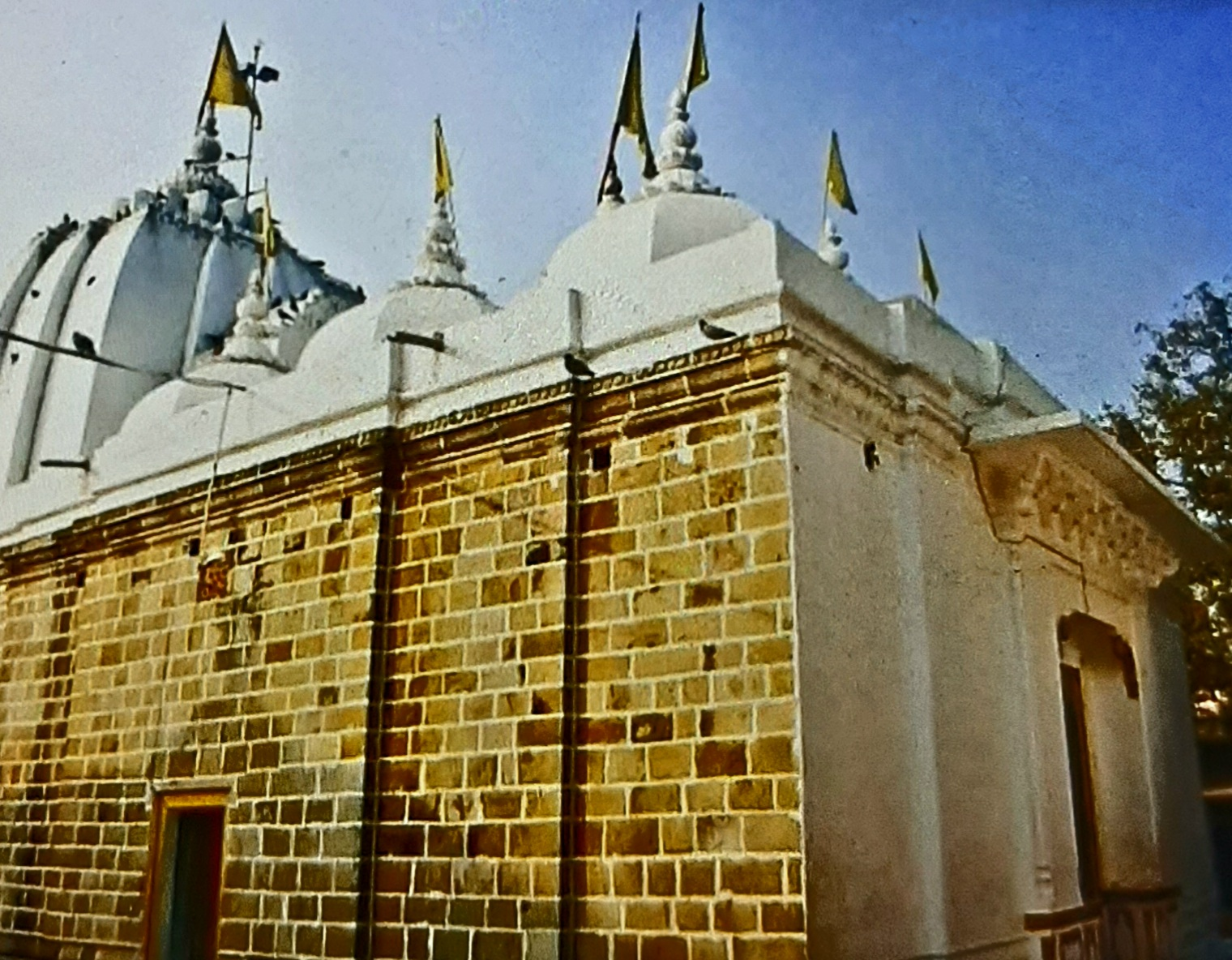
Shri Bharat Mandir (Hrishikesh Narayan Temple)

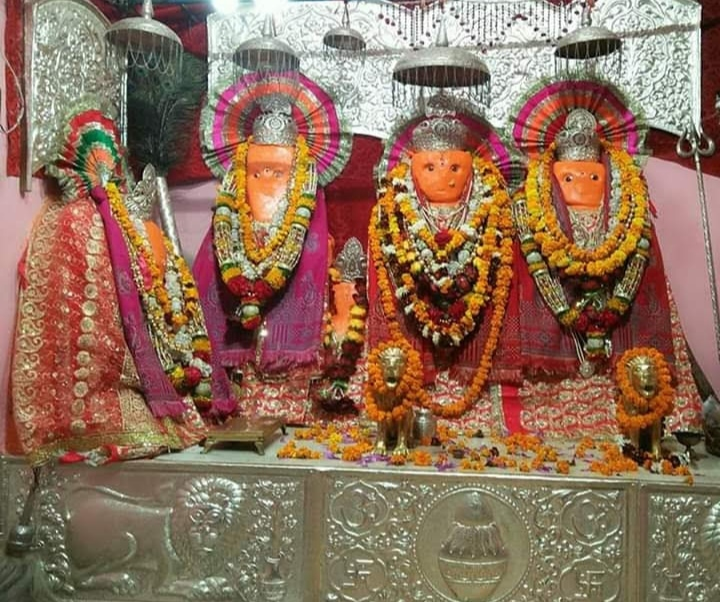
Shakumbhari devi, right side Bhima and Bhramari left side Goddess Shatakshi

The importance of Maya Puri (Haridwar)-Rishikesh) tirth region is clearly mentioned in puranas. This tirth is located in Uttarakhand, India. Haridwar tirth region is mainly dedicated to shiva and Parvati, whereas Vishnu is primarily worshipped in Rishikesh tirth region.

Temples in Haridwar Tirth region:-

1.Daksheshwar Mahadev Temple

2.Shitla mata Temple (Sati mata janmsthan)

3.Narayani shila Temple

4.Mansa Devi Temple

5.Maya Devi Temple

6.Chandi Devi Temple

7.Bilkeshwar Mahadev Temple

8.Paradeshwar Mahadev Temple

9.Nileshwar Mahadev Temple

10.Har ki Paudi Ganga Ghat(Ganesh ji Temple)

11.Dakshin Kali Temple

12.Aanand Bhairav Temple

Temples in Rishikesh Tirth Region:-

1.Trayambakeshwar Temple

2.Shri Hrishikesh Narayan Temple (Bharat Mandir)

3.Veerabhadra Temple

4.Neelkanth Mahadev Temple

5.Laxman temple

6.Shatrughna Temple

7.Chandreshwar Mahadev temple

== Naimisharanya ==
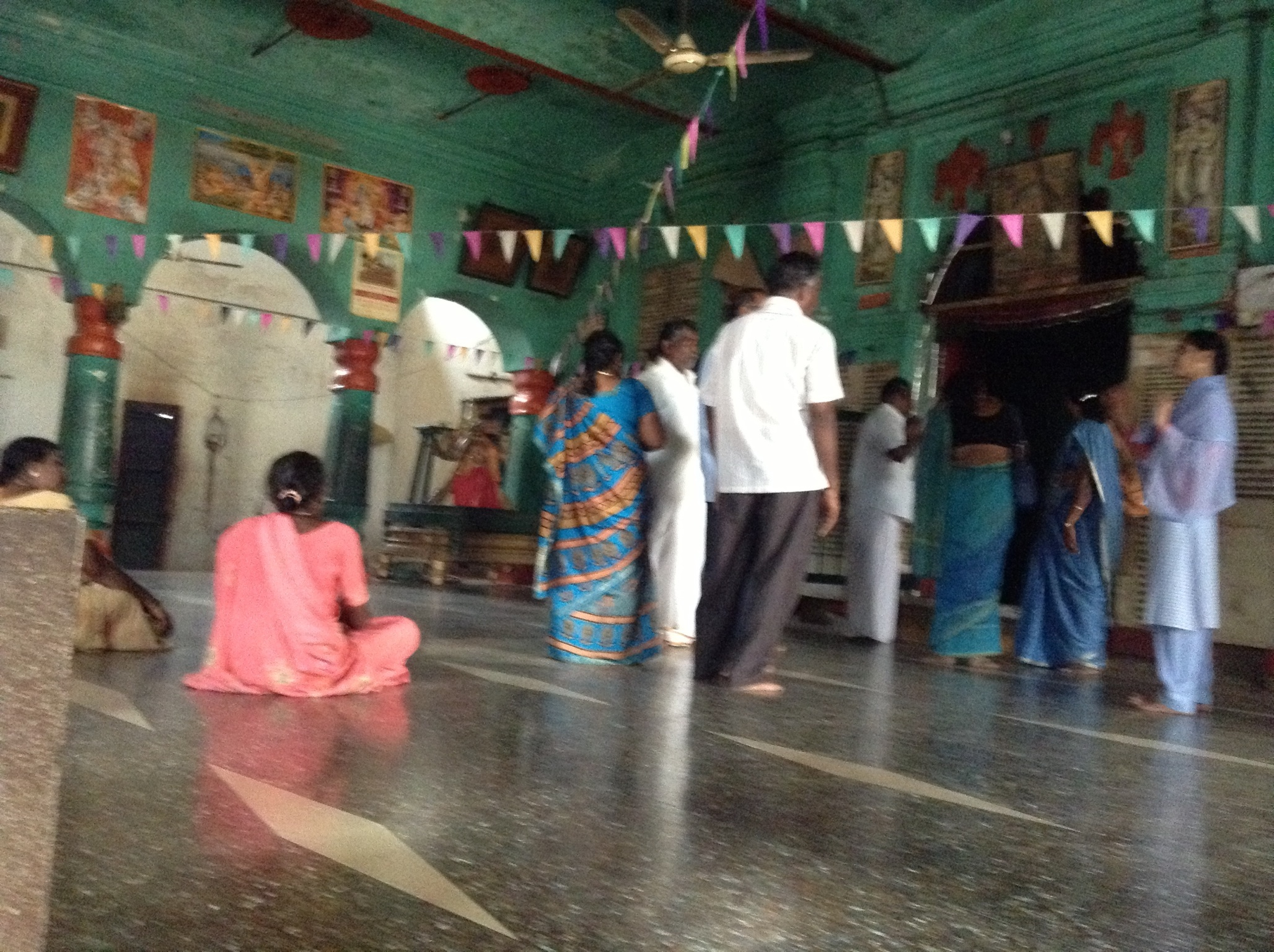
Sabha Mandap of Shri Naimishnath Temple

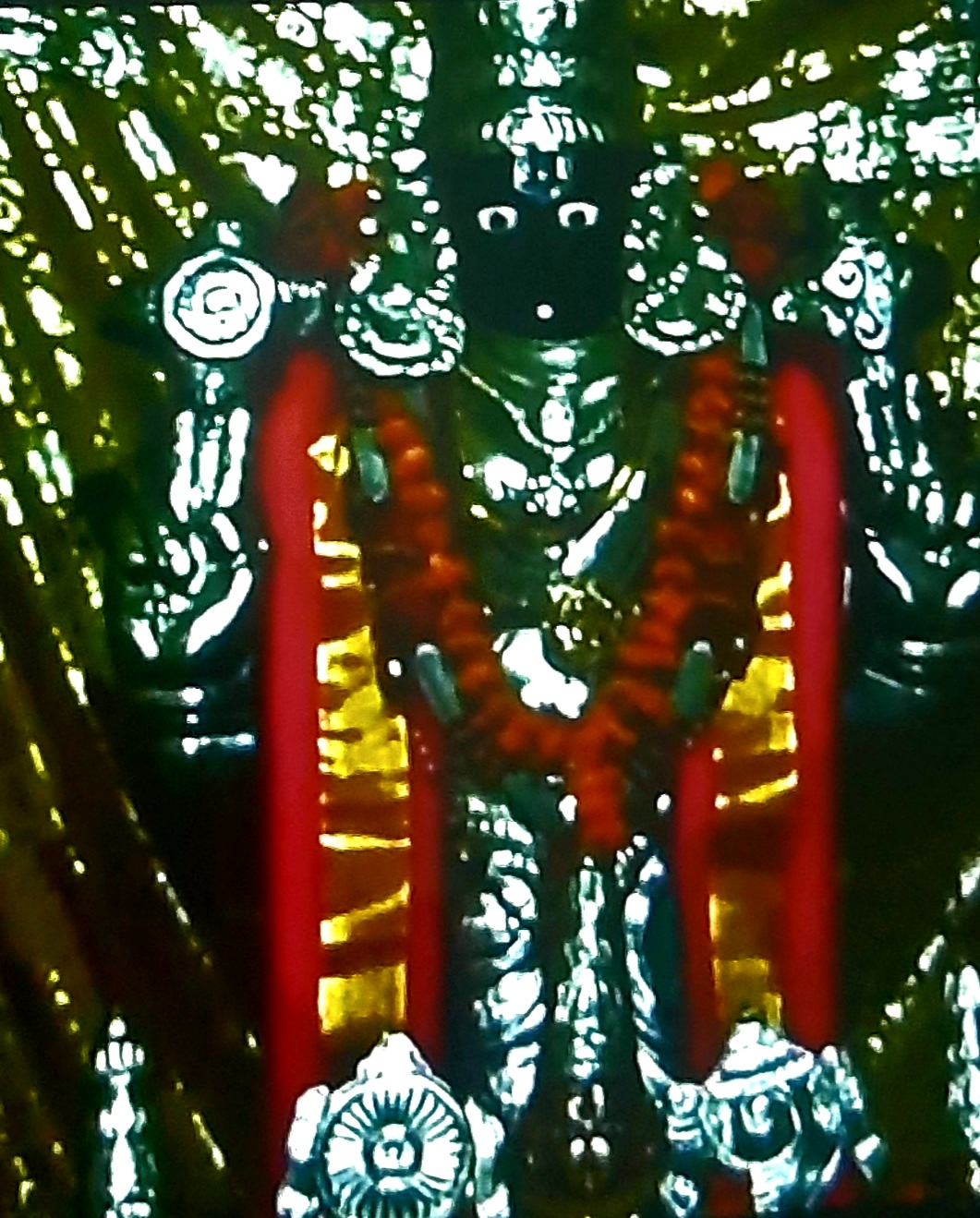
Vishnu Idol Inside the Sanctum Sanctorum of Naimishnath Temple

Naimisa-Forest or Naimisharanya(Misrikh-Neemasar) is a Vaishnav tirth region located in Uttar Pradesh, India. Vishnu is mainly worshipped in this tirth.

Temples in Misrikh tirth region:-

1.Rishi Dhadichi Temple

2.Dhadichi Kund

Temples in Neemsar(Naimisharanya) tirth region:-

1.Naimishnath Vishnu Temple

2.Chakra Tirth Temple

3.Bhooteshwar Mahadev Temple

4.Vyas Gaddi

5.Sut Gaddi

6.Chakranarayan Temple

7.Hanuman Garhi Temple

8.Lalita Devi Temple

9.Devdeveshwar Mahadev Temple

10.Gomti river (Dashasumedh ghat)

11.Hatya-Haran Tirth (Hatya-Haraneshwar Mahadev Temple)

== Tirths of Uttarakhand ==
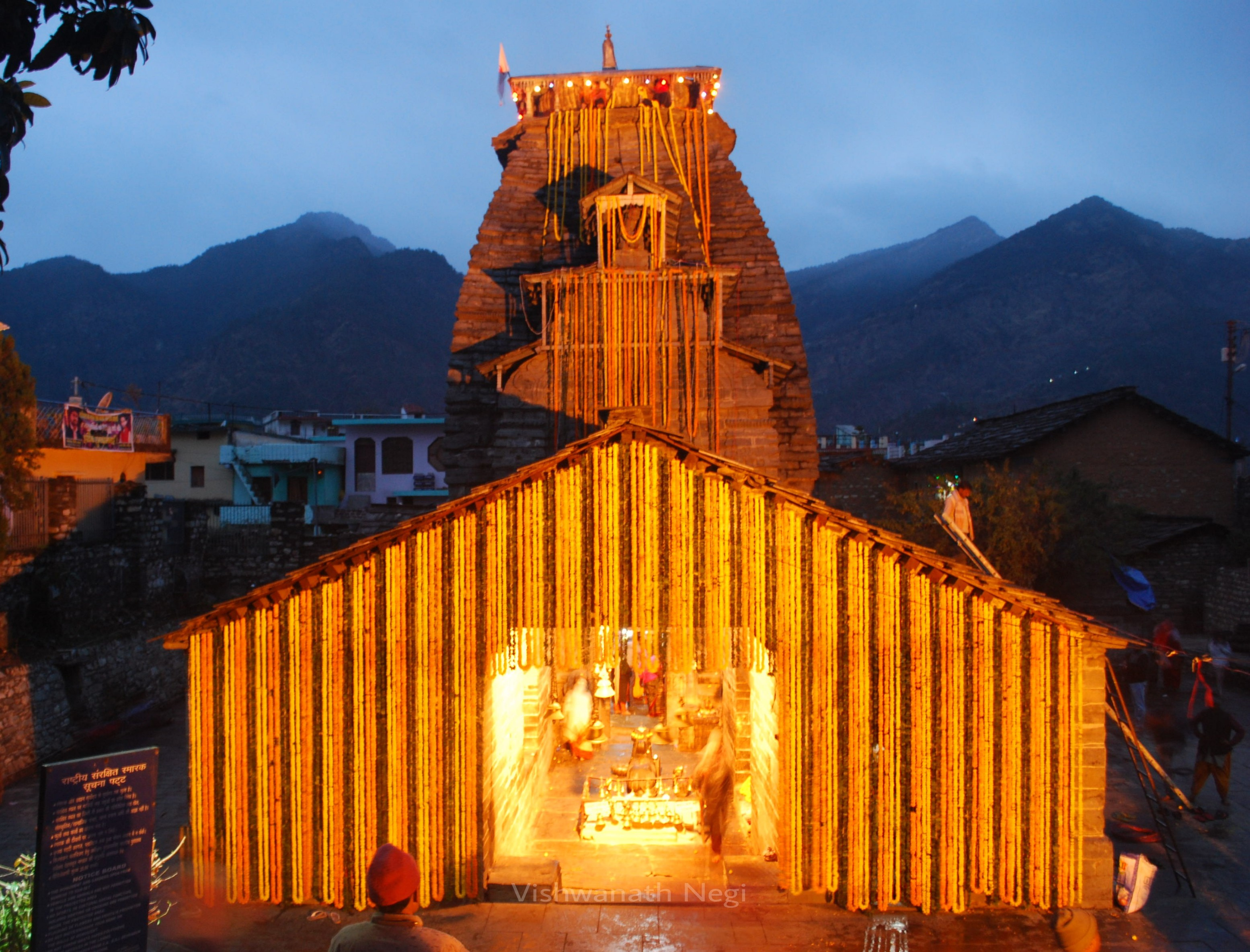
Shri Kedarnath Jyotirlinga Temple

kedar Tirth Region:-

In kedar Tirth mainly Shiva and Parvati is worshipped.

1.Kedarnath Temple

2.Gaurikund Temple

3.Triyuginarayan Temple

4.Guptkashi Temple

5.Ukhimath Omkareshwar Temple

6.Kalimath Temple

7.Tungnath Temple

8.Rudranath Temple

9.Madhyamaheshwar Temple

10.Bhairav Temple, kedarnath

11.Gopinath Temple, Gopeshwar

12.Munkatia Ganesh Temple

13.Anasuya Devi Temple, Gopeshwar

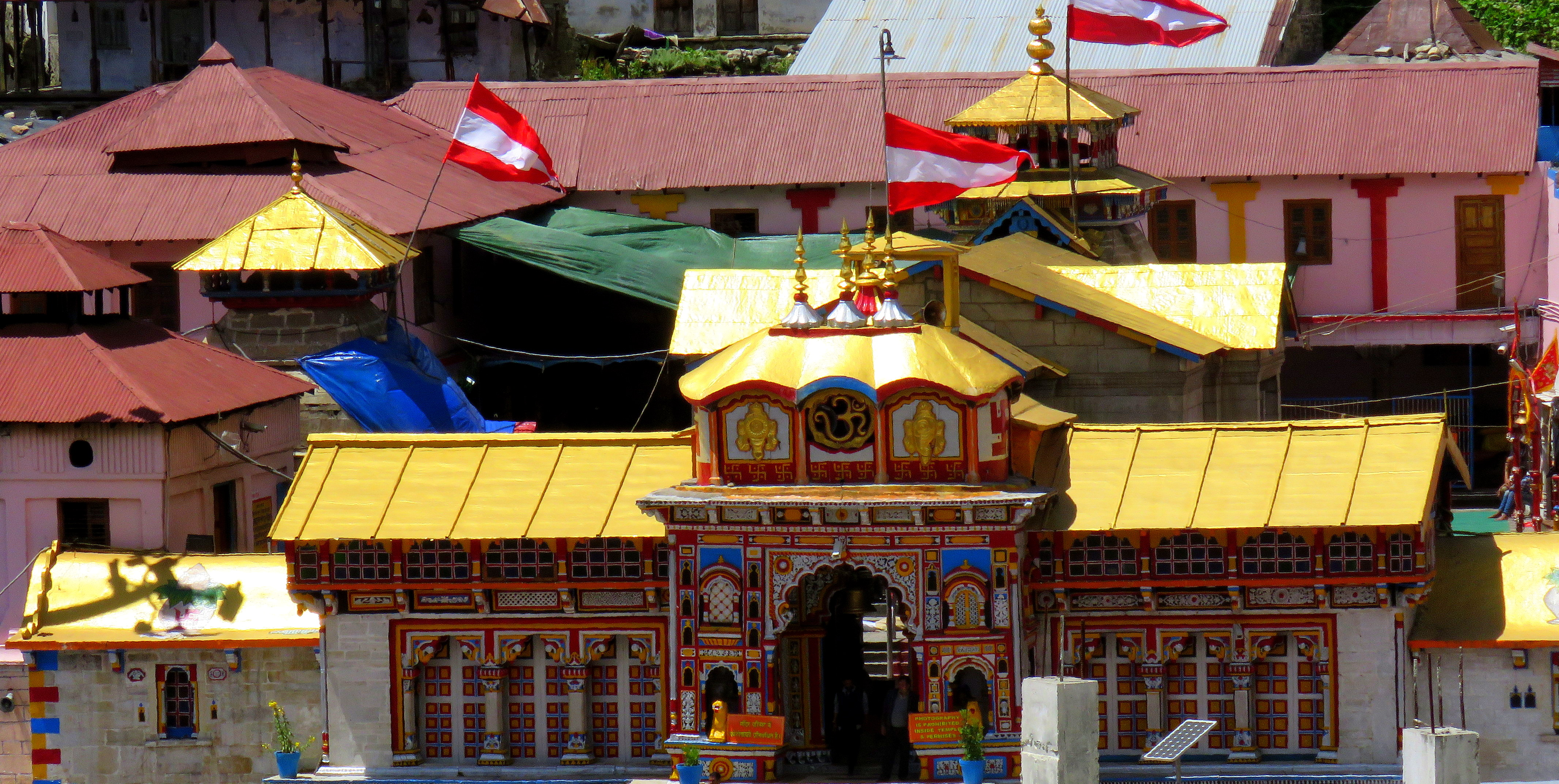
Badrinath Temple

Badri tirth Region:-

In Badri Tirth mainly Vishnu and Lakshmi is worshipped.

1.Badrinath Temple

2.Kalpeshwar Temple

3.Bhavishya Badri Temple

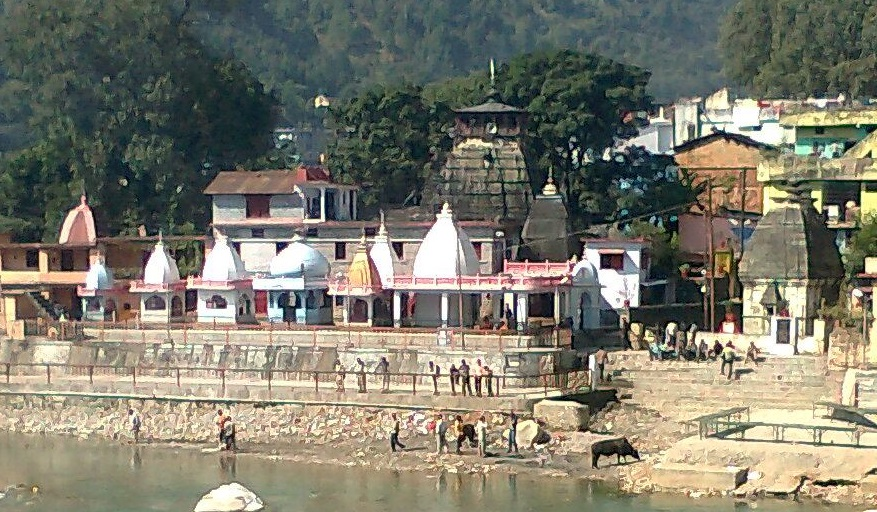
Bagnath Temple

4.Vishnuprayag Temple

5.Kuber Temple, Pandukeshwar

6.Yog dhyan Badri Temple, Pandukeshwar

7.Dhyan Badri Temple

8.Vyas Gufa, Mana

9.Vriddha Badri Temple

10.Joshimath Narsingh Mandir

Panch Prayag Tirth Region:-

1.Uma devi Temple, Karnaprayag

2.Umra Narayan Temple

3.Rudranath Temple, Rudraprayag

4.Nandprayag Temple

5.Adi Badri Temple, Karnaprayag

6.Augustmuni Temple

7.Neelmegha Vishnu Temple, Devaprayag

8.Dhari Devi Temple

9.Koteshwar Mahadev Temple

10.Chamunda devi Temple, Rudraprayag

11.Tungeshwar Mahadev Temple

12.Kartik Swami Temple

13.Indrasani Devi Temple, Kandali, Rudraprayag

14.Karmajeet Temple, Pillu, Rudraprayag

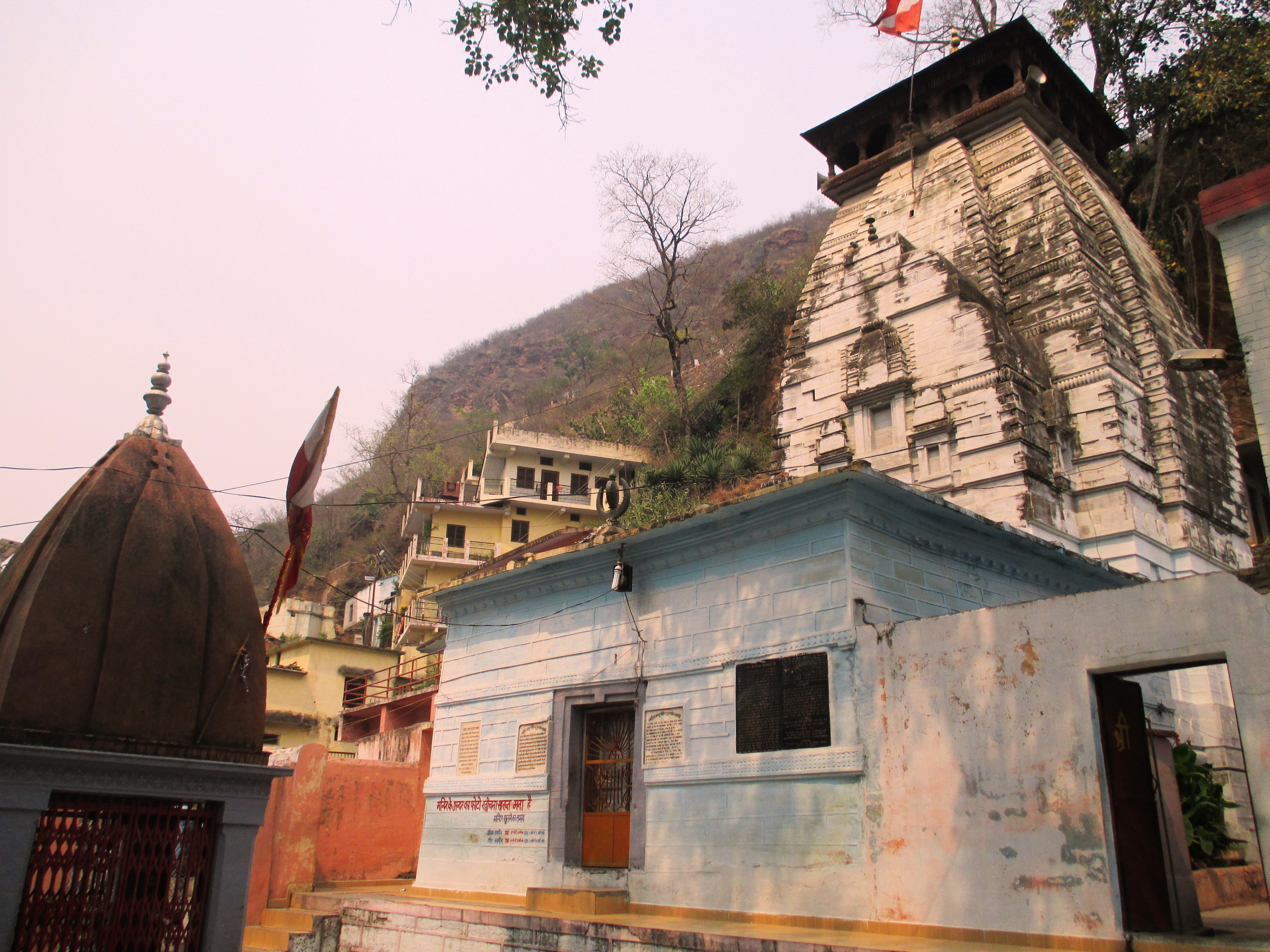
Neelmegha Vishnu Temple

kumaon tirth Region:-

1.Bagnath Temple, Bageshwar

2.Baijnath Temple, Garur

3.Jageshwar Dham

4.Kot Bhramari Temple, Kajyuli

5.Devidhura Varahi Temple

6.Poornagiri Temple

7.Danda Nagraja Temple

Garhwal tirth Region:-

1.Tapkeshwar Mahadev Temple

2.Daat Kali Temple, Dehradun

3.Santala Devi Temple, Dehradun

4.Sem Mukhem Nag Temple

5.Budha Kedar Temple

6.Surkanda Devi Temple

7.Uttarkashi Shiva-Shakti Temple

8.Lakhamandal Temple

9.Yamunotri Temple

10.Gangotri Temple

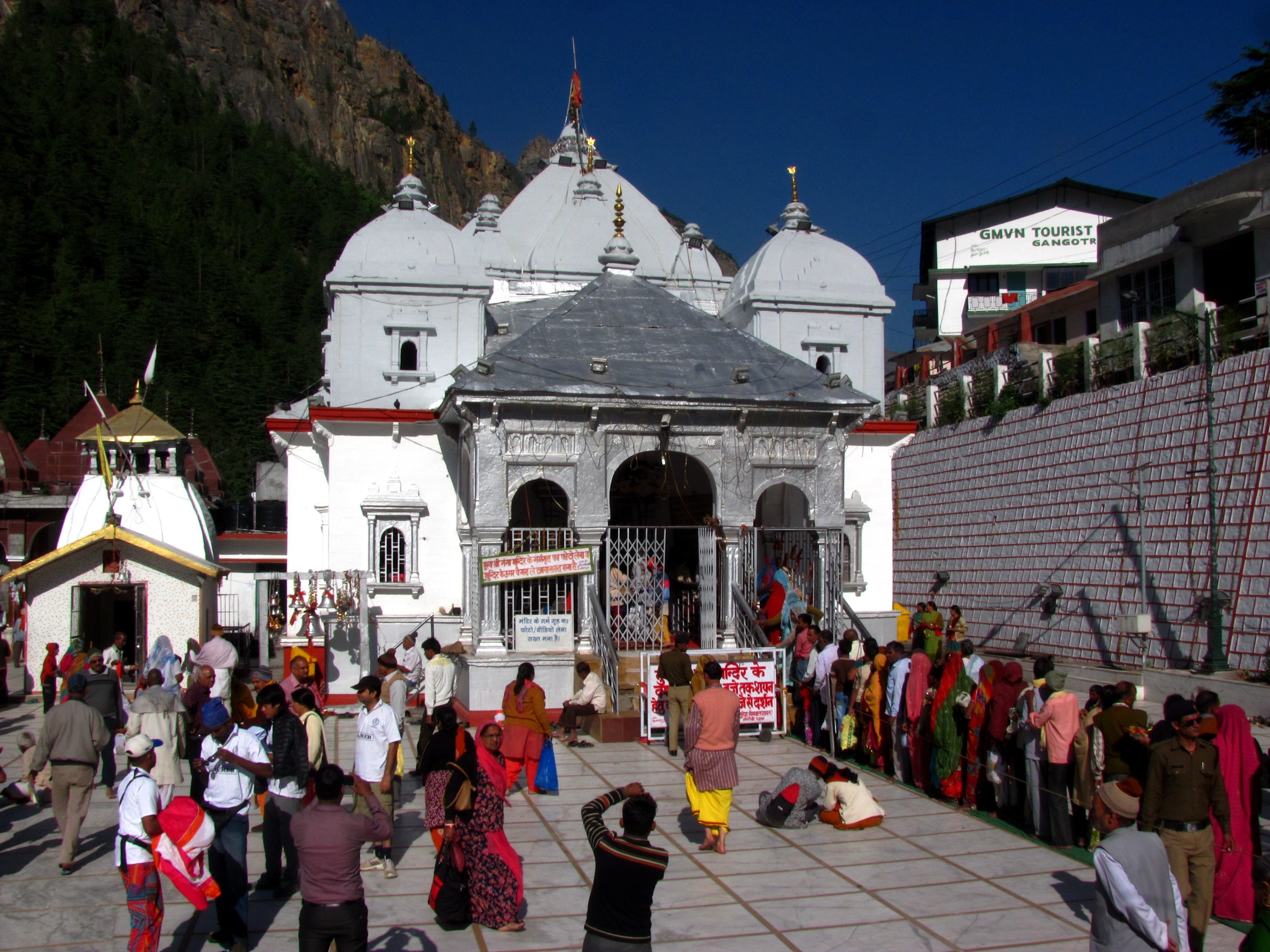
Gangotri Temple

11.Gaumukh

12.Shani Dev Temple, Kharsoli

13.Kyunkaleshwar Temple

14.Mahasu Devta Temple, Hanol

15.Prachin Bhairav Temple, Gangotri

== Shookar kshetra ==
In Narsingh Puran, It is mentioned that Shookar kshetra in one of the abodes of Vishnu which is Located in Uttar Pradesh, India. It is dedicated to Varah form of Vishnu. Today shookar kshetra consist of parts of Kasganj and Bulandsahar District. Whole Shookar kshetra is located on the banks of the river Ganga.

Temples in Shookar Kshetra(Soron) tirth:-

1.Shookar Temple(Varah Temple), Soron[Kasganj district]

2.Har ki paudi Teerth (Holy Tank), Soron[kasganj district]

3.Belon Devi Temple, Belon [Bulandsahar district]

4.kalyani Devi Temple, Karanwas [Bulandsahar District]

5.Ram ghat (ganga ghat) near Narora[Bulandsahar District]

6.Raj ghat(ganga ghat) near Narora[Bulandsahar District]

7.Suryakund, Soron [Kasganj District]

8.Navdurga Temple, Soron [Kasganj District]

9.Batuk Bhairav Nath ji Temple, Soron [Kasganj District]

10.Sheetla Mata Temple, Soron [Kasganj District]

11.Laddu Waale Balaji Mandir, Soron [Kasganj District]

== Kanyakubj ==
Kanyakubj or Kannauj is a very ancient tirth present in Uttar Pradesh, India.It is also has a great importance in Indian history. It was the capital of the Harshvardhan dynasty. Its importance is given in Devi Bhagwat puran and Brahma puran. Brahmins from Kanyakubj are worldwide famous and are regularly appointed as the head priest of many Hindu temples located in Kannauj and north India.

Major Temples located in Kannauj Tirth are:-

1.Gauri shankar temple

2.Phoolmati Devi temple

3.Annapoorna Temple, Tirwaganj

4.Dauleshwar Mahadev Temple, tirwaganj

5.Govardhani Devi Temple

6.Gangeshwarnath Temple, chhibramau

7.Mansheshwarnath Temple, chhibramau

8.Kalika Devi Mandir, chhibramau

9.Bagiya Waale Hanumanji Temple, Chhibramau

10.Maa Aanandi Devi Temple, Prempur

== Braj ==
Braj, also known as Mathura Puri, is an 84-kos tirth kshetra in the state of Uttar Pradesh, India. It is dedicated to Vishnu in his incarnation as Krishna. Today, the Braj region comprises Mathura district in Uttar Pradesh, along with parts of the states of Haryana and Rajasthan. The temples in the region are traditionally believed to have been established by Vajranabha, the grandson of Krishna. For this reason, the tirth is also associated with Vajranabha and is known as Braj. The tirth is mentioned in the Skanda Purana, the Bhagavata Purana, the Brahma Vaivarta Purana, and other Hindu scriptures.

Braj Region is divided into many villages, these villages and their respective temples are mentioned below:-

Mathura tirth region:-

1. Shri Keshav Deo Temple

2. Shri Bhooteshwar Mahadev Temple

3. Shri Rangeshwar Mahadev temple

4. Shri Gokarneshwar Mahadev Temple

5. Shri Galteshwar Mahadev Temple

6. Shri Pipleshwar Mahadev Temple

7. Vishram ghat(Yamuna mandir)

8. Chamunda Mata Temple

9. Shri mathura Devi Temple

10. Kankali devi Temple

11. Mahavidya devi Temple

12. Shantanu Bihari Temple

13. Dirgh vishnu Temple

Gokul-Mahavan-Baldeo Tirth Region

1. Gokulnathji Temple(Nand Bhavan 84 Khamba )

2. Nand Bhavan, Gokul

3. Chandravali Mata Temple

4. Chintaharan Mahadev Temple

5. Brahmaand ghat

6. Raman Reti Temple

7. Baldeo Temple

8. Bandi Anandi Manomanccha maa Temple

9. Rawal Radha Rani Temple

Vrindavan tirth Region:-

1. Bankey Bihari Temple

2. Radha Raman Temple

3. Radha Damodar Temple

4. Radha Govind dev ji temple

5. Radha Shyam sundar Temple

6. Radha Madan Mohan Temple

7. Radha Gokulnand Temple

8. Radha Gopinath Temple

9. Radha Vallabh Temple

10. Shri Garud Govind ji Temple

11. Nidhivan

12. Mota ganesh ji Temple

13. Sewa kunj

14. Gopeshwar Mahadev Temple

15. Chamunda Mata Temple

16. Katayani Mata Temple

Govardhan Tirth kshetra:-

1. Giriraj ji Temple, Daanghati

2. Giriraj ji Temple, Jatipura

3. Giriraj ji Temple, Mansi Ganga

4. Luk luk Dauji Temple

5. Chandra Sarovar

6. Kusum sarovar

7. Radha Kund

8. Haridev ji Temple

9. Punchhari ka Lauthra Temple

10. Chakleshwar Mahadev Temple

11. Indra Maan Daman Temple

12. Mansa Devi Temple

13. Vankhandi Mahadev Temple

14. Kundeshwar Mahadev Temple

15. Radha Kund Mukharvind temple

16. Narayan Sarovar

17. Lalit Kund

== List of Hindu pilgrimage sites in India ==
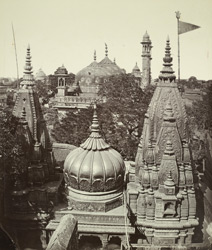
Varanasi is one of the main pilgrimage sites.

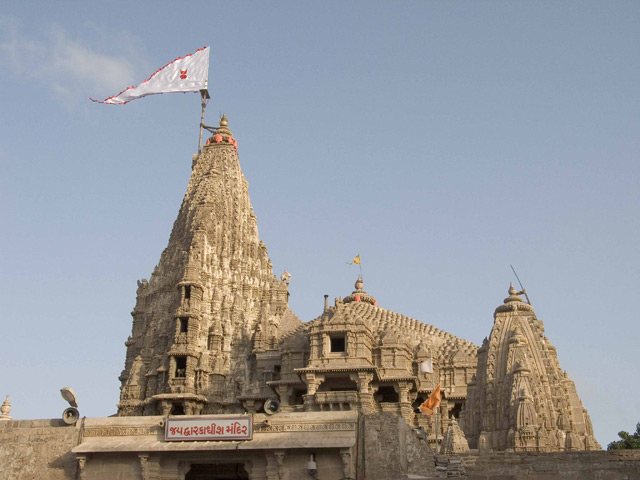
Dwaraka temple

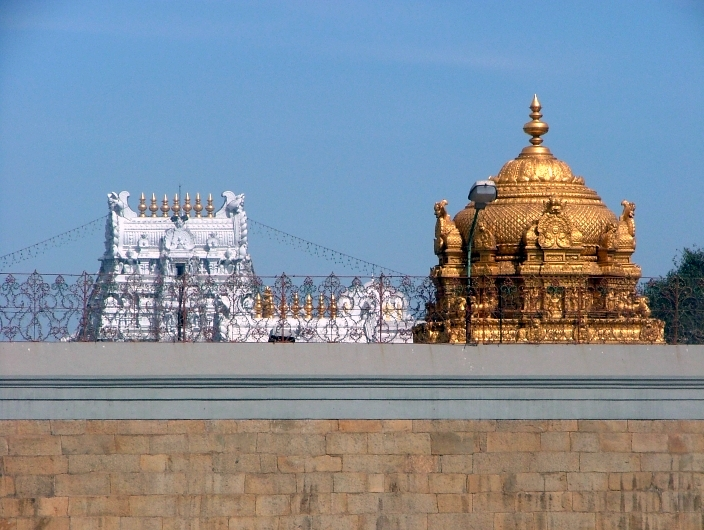
Tirupati temple

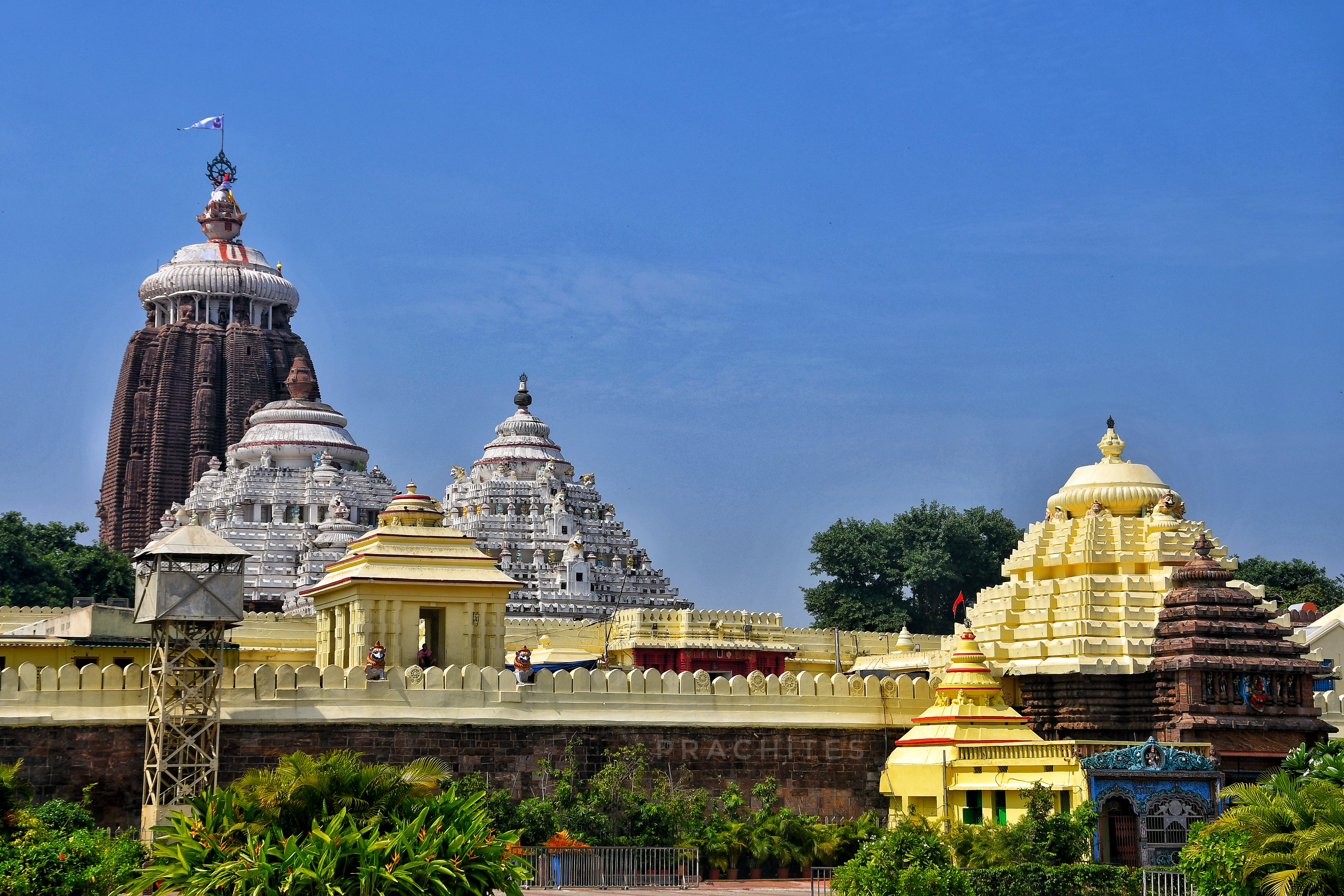
Jagannath temple

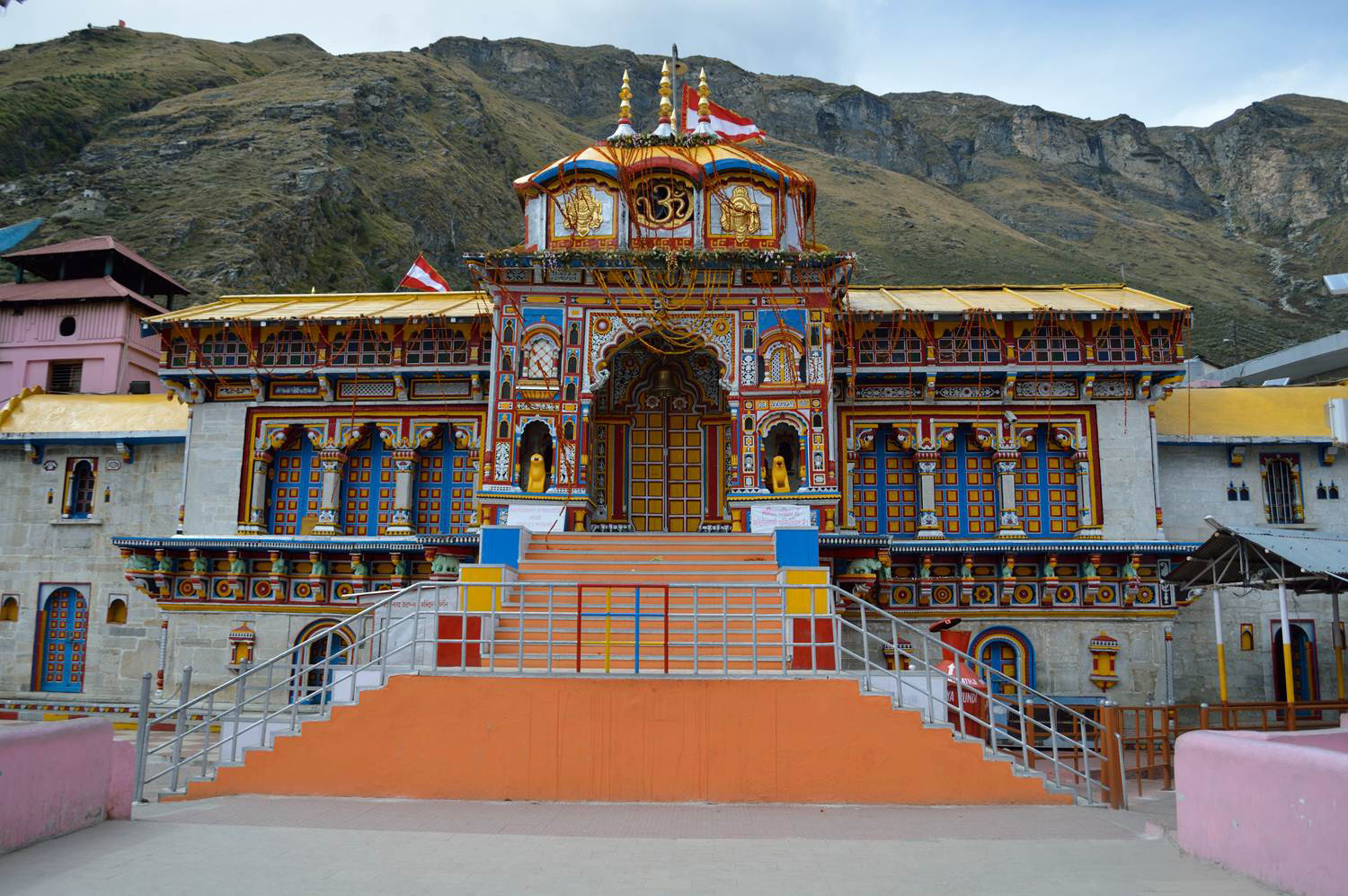
Badrinath temple

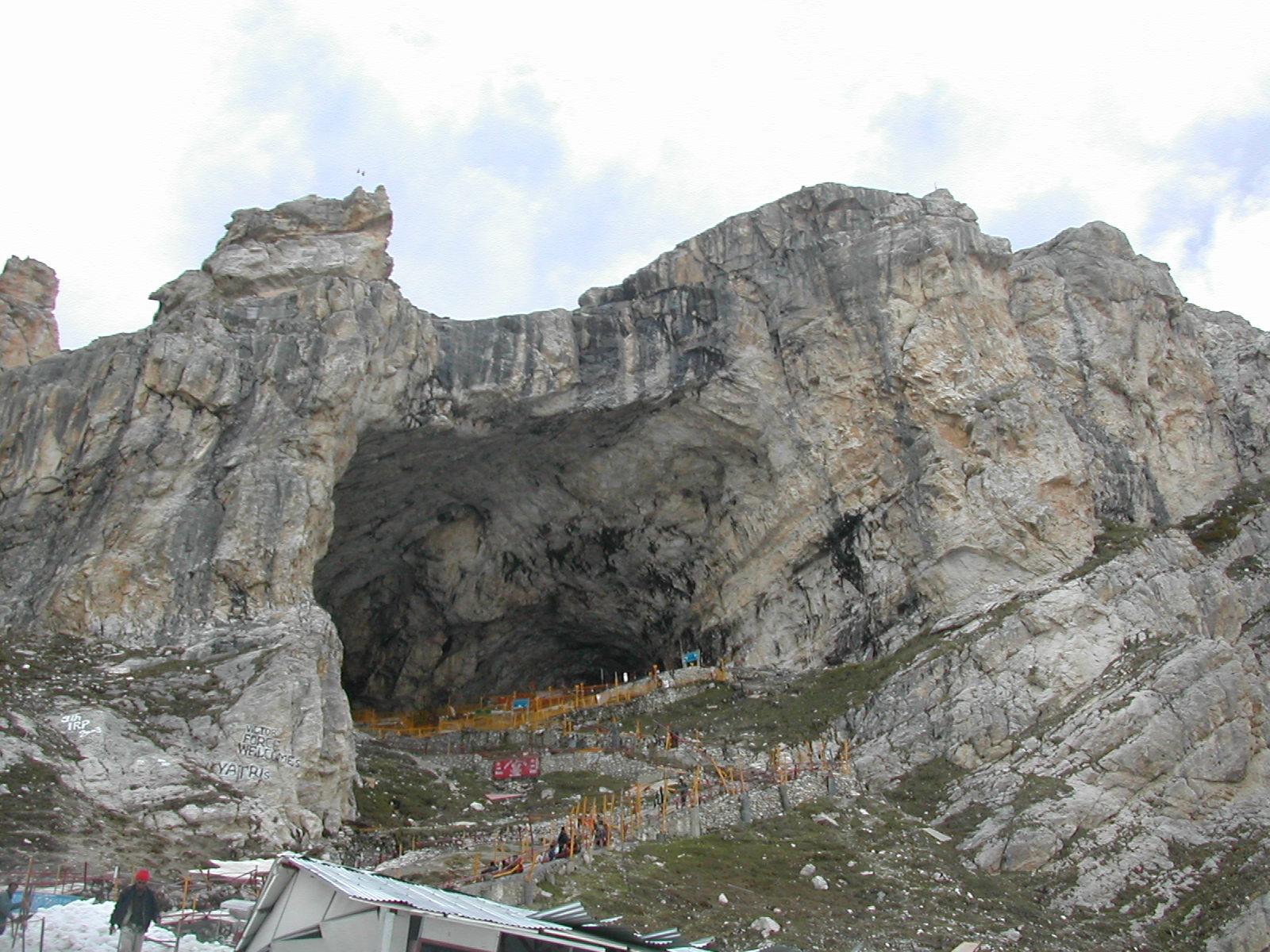
Amarnath temple

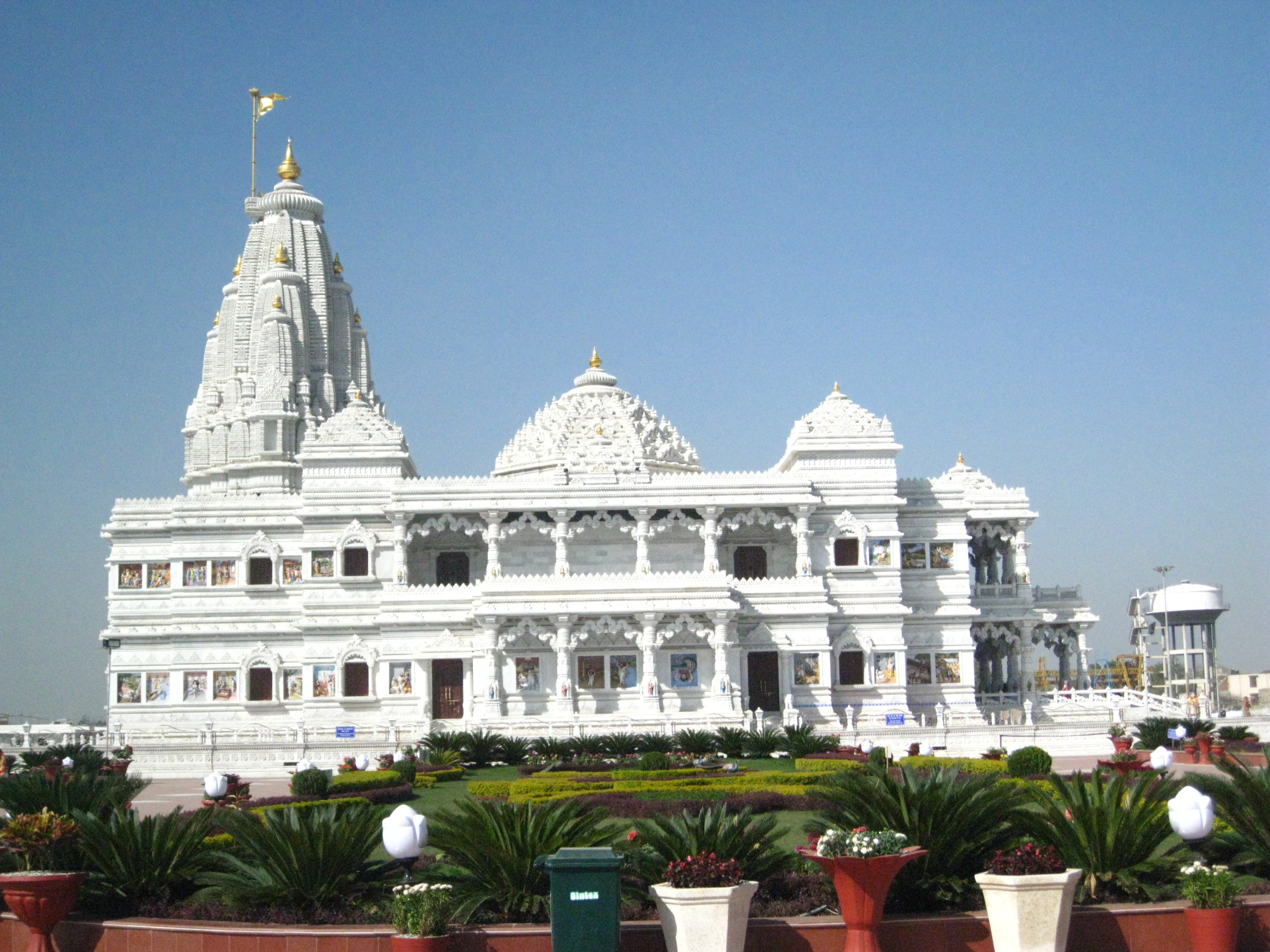
Prem Mandir, Vrindavan

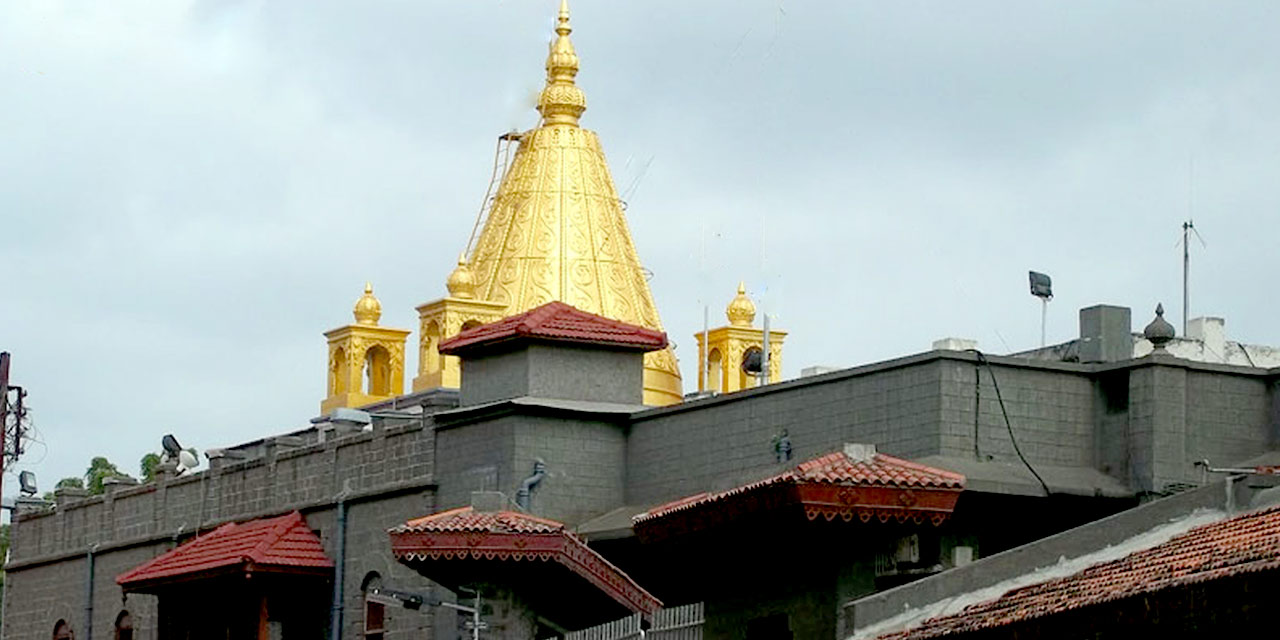
Shri Sai Baba Temple, Shirdi

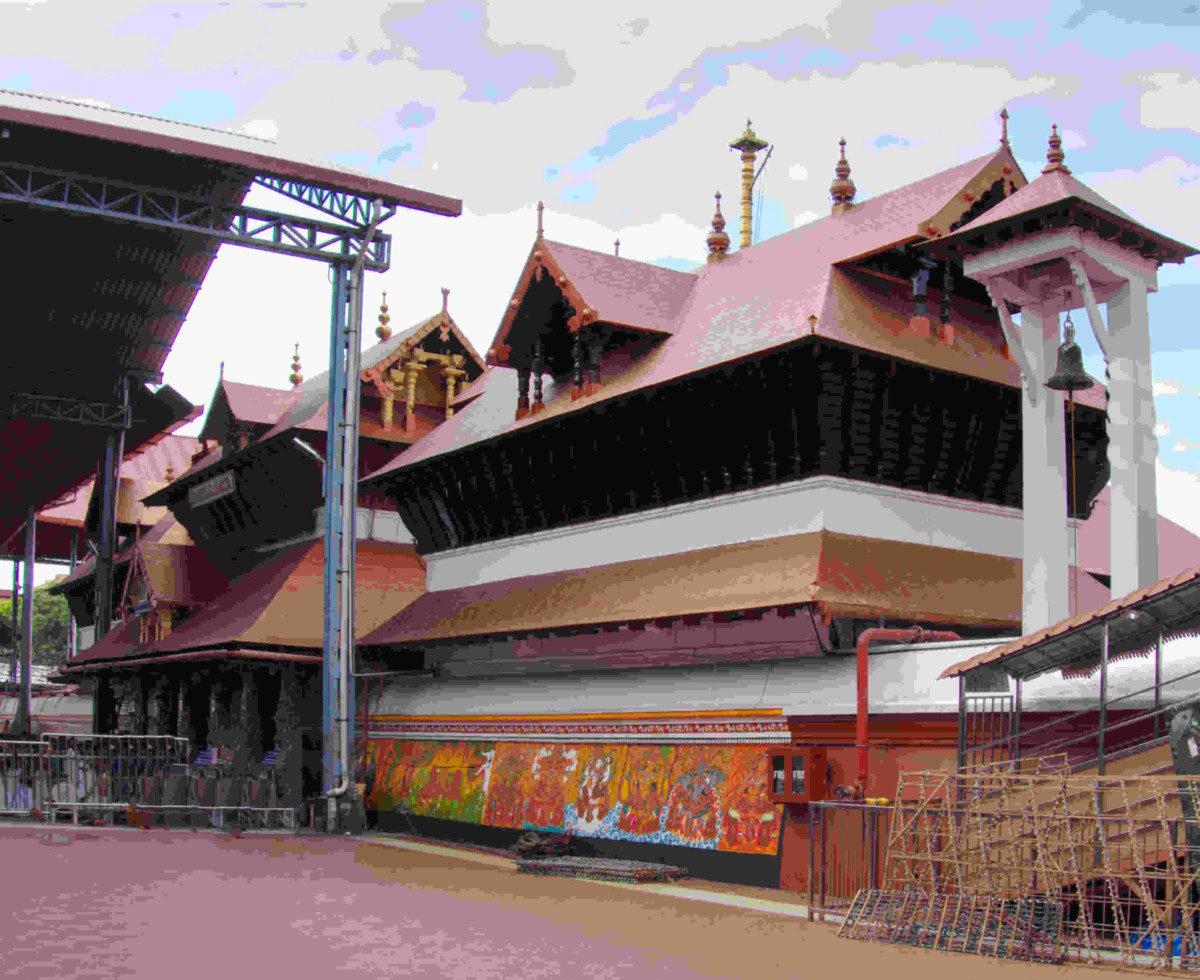
Guruvayoor Temple

- 48 kos parikrama of Kurukshetra
- Adhi Thiruvarangam
- Ahobilam
- Akshardham (Delhi)
- Alandi
- Amarnath
- Anaimalai
- Arasavalli
- Ashtavinayak temples
- Ayodhya
- Badrinath
- Baidyanath Temple
- Bangalore
- Bagdana
- Barsana
- Belur Math
- Bhadrachalam
- Biraja Temple Jajpur
- Bhavani
- Bhimashankar Temple
- Chennai
- Chidambaram
- Chilkur Balaji Temple
- Chitrakuta
- Chottanikkara
- Dharmasthala
- Divya Desams
- Draksharama
- Dwarka
- Gangotri
- Gaya
- Ghatikachala
- Gokarna
- Gokul
- Golden Temple, Sripuram
- Govardhan
- Grishneshwar Jyotirlinga
- Guruvayur
- Hampi
- Haridwar
- Horanadu
- Idagunji
- Jejuri
- Jyotirmath
- Kalaram Temple
- Kalasa
- Kalavai
- Kanchipuram
- Kanipakam
- Kanyakumari
- Karmanghat Hanuman Temple
- Kateel
- Kartik Swami
- Kedarnath
- Kolhapur Mahalaxmi Temple
- Kollur
- Konark
- Koothanur
- Ksheerarama
- Kudalasangama
- Kukke Subramanya Temple
- Kumararama
- Kumbakonam
- Kurukshetra
- Laxminarayan Temple, Delhi
- Lingaraja Temple
- Mahakaleshwar Jyotirlinga
- Madurai
- Maha Devi Tirth temple in Kullu
- Mahabalipuram
- Mantralayam
- Marudhamalai
- Mathura
- Melmaruvathur
- Melmalayanur
- Mount Abu
- Mukhalingam
- Mumbai
- Murdeshwar
- Mysore
- Nageshwar Temple
- Namakkal Anjaneyar Temple
- Nashik
- Navagraham Temples
- Nellitheertha
- Omkareshwar
- Paadal Petra Sthalam
- Padmavathi Temple, Tiruchanur
- Palani
- Pallikondeswara Temple, Surutapalli
- Pancharama Kshetras
- Pancharanga Kshetrams
- Panchavati
- Panchavatee Hanuman Temple
- Pandharpur
- Papanasam
- Pazhamudircholai
- Pillayarpatti
- Pithapuram
- Prayagraj
- Punnainallur Mariamman Temple
- Puri
- Pushkar
- Puttlur
- Ramatheertham
- Rameswaram
- Rishikesh
- Sabarimalai
- Samayapuram
- Satyagnana Sabha, Vadalur
- Shani Shingnapur
- Shegaon
- Shirdi
- Simhachalam
- Somanath
- Somarama
- Sri Kurmam
- Srikalahasti
- Sringeri
- Srirangam
- Srisailam
- Srivilliputhur
- Swamimalai
- Suchindram
- Swamithoppe
- Tenkasi
- Thanjavur
- Thennangur
- Thiruchendur
- Thiruparankundram
- Thiruthani
- Thiruvananthapuram
- Thiruverkadu
- Thrissur
- Tirupati
- Tripura Sundari
- Thiruvanaikaval
- Tiruvannamalai
- Trichy Uchi Pillayar Temple
- Trimbakeshwar Shiva Temple
- Tuljapur Bhavani temple
- Udupi
- Ujjain
- Vaishno Devi
- Varanasi
- Raja Rajeswara Temple, Vemulawada
- Vellore
- Vijayawada
- Vindhayachal
- Vrindavan
- Yadagirigutta Temple
- Yamunotri
- Virpur, Rajkot district

== See also ==
- The Archaeology of Hindu Ritual
- Culture of India
- Hindu pilgrimage sites of world
- Kumbh Mela
- List of Hindu festivals
- List of Parikrama pilgrim circuits
- List of Parikrama pilgrim sites
- Tourism in India
- Yatra
