= Nana Jadra, Bhavnagar =

Nana Jadra
- Village
- Location in Gujarat, India Nana Jadra (India)
- Coordinates: 21.121049°N 71.711387°E
- Country: India
- State: Gujarat
- District: Mahuva, Bhavnagar

Languages
  - Official: Gujarati, Hindi
- Time zone: UTC+5:30 (IST)
- Telephone code: 02844
- Vehicle registration: GJ4
- Nearest city: Mahuva, Bhavnagar
- Website: gujaratindia.com

Nana Jadra is a village of Gujarat located near Arabian Sea and 96 km south from district headquarters Bhavnagar.

== Nearby Places to visit ==
- Palitana
- Bagdana
- Kotada
- Bhavani mandir

== How to reach ==
- BY RAILWAY -

- Sajanvar Road
- Mahuva Jn
- Mota Jadra
- Amritvel
;

- BY AIRPORT -

- Bhavnagar Airport
- Vadodara Airport
- Civil airport
- Diu Airport

== School ==
Nana Jadra P. School
Address : Nana Jadra primary school, Mahuva, Gujarat

== College ==
M.M.Doshi Arts & commers College
Address : Jesar, Mahuva
