= Shri Sai Baba Temple, Shirdi =

Coordinates: 19.766182°N 74.476998°E

Shri Saibaba Temple
- श्री साई बाबा समाधी मंदिर
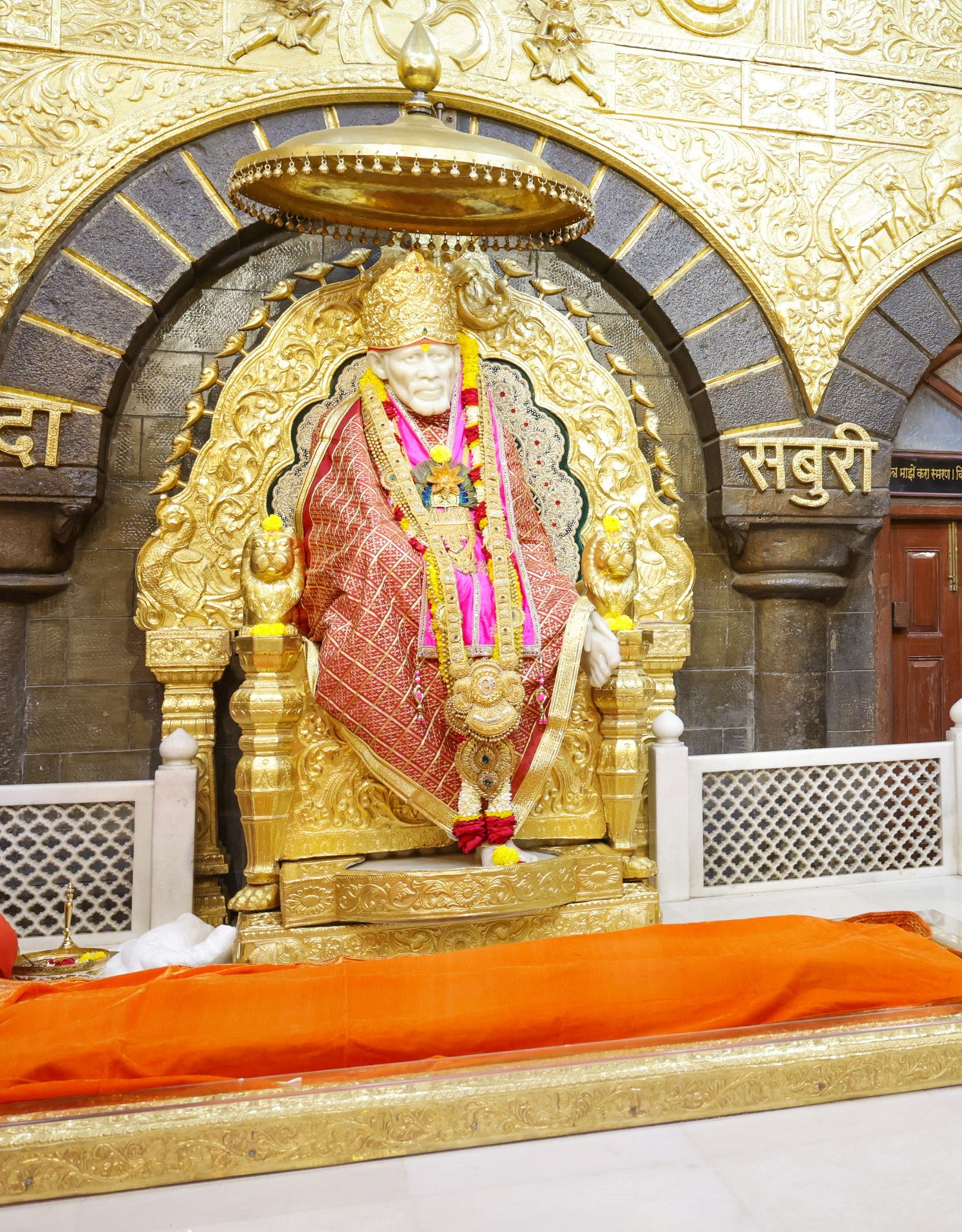
- Shirdi Sai Baba and his Samadhi.

- Location within Maharashtra

Religion
- Affiliation: Hinduism
- District: Ahilyanagar
- Deity: Hindu
- Festivals: Gurupurnima,Ram navami, Punyatihi utshav
- Ecclesiastical or organisational status: The Trust is registered as a public charitable trust under the Bombay Public Trusts Act, 1950
- Governing body: Shri Saibaba Sansthan Trust, Shirdi, Trust
- Status: Functioning

Location
- Location: Shirdi
- State: Maharashtra
- Country: India

Architecture
- Style: Wada
- Established: 1918
- Site area: over 200 acres
- Official name: Shree Buti wada

Website
- https://sai.org.in/

The Shri Saibaba Temple, Shirdi, also known as Shri Saibaba Samadhi Mandir, is a prominent Hindu temple complex located in Shirdi, Ahilyanagar district, Maharashtra, India. Dedicated to the 19th-century saint Sai Baba of Shirdi, it is one of the most visited pilgrimage sites in India, attracting millions of devotees annually from India and abroad.

== History ==
Shri Sai Baba, a revered spiritual leader regarded by his followers believed to be incarnation of god dattatrey, lived in Shirdi for most of his life until his death in 1918. After his Mahasamadhi (passing), his mortal remains were interred in a shrine built on 15 October 1918, which later became the core of the present temple. The construction of the temple was initiated by Shreemant Gopalrao Buti, a wealthy devotee from Nagpur, who envisioned it as a Wada (residential mansion) for Baba. Today, this shrine is popularly known as the Shri Samadhi Mandir.

== Temple complex ==
The temple complex spans over 200 square meters and consists of several sacred sites associated with Sai Baba:

- Samadhi Mandir – the main shrine housing Sai Baba's mandir.
- Dwarkamai – the Mandir where Sai Baba lived for over 60 years, now preserved with a sacred dhuni (fire which is Still Burning).
- Chavadi – the place where Baba used to sleep on alternate nights.
- Gurusthan – regarded as the spot where Baba was first seen meditating under a Neem Tree (The Tree is believed to be healing properties and its leaves are sweat) and considered a sacred place of baba's spiritual guru.
- Lendi Baug – a garden developed by Sai Baba, featuring the sacred Nanda Deep (ever-burning lamp).

== Rituals and worship ==
Daily worship rituals include:

- Kakad Aarti (morning)
- Madhyan Aarti (noon)
- Dhoop Aarti (evening) and
- Shej Aarti (night).
- Sri Sai satnarayan pooja
- Sri Sai Abhishek pooja
- Pothi Reading

Special events include Rama Navami, Guru Purnima, Vijayadashami (Sai Baba's Mahasamadhi day), and New year, which draw lakhs of devotees per year and records the highest in India.

== Management ==
The temple is managed by the Shri Saibaba Sansthan Trust, Shirdi, one of the wealthiest temple trusts in India. The trust oversees not only temple operations but also charitable hospitals, educational institutions, dharamshalas, and social service initiatives in the region.

Current CEO - Sri Goraksha Gadilkar

== Pilgrimage and footfall ==
The temple is among the top and biggest pilgrimage destinations in India recorded as the highest footfall temple in India, with an estimated 60,000 visitors daily, rising to over 2,00,000 - 3,00,000 during festivals from across India and abroad. It is considered one of the richest temples in India by donations and offerings.

== Accessibility ==
Shirdi is connected by Shirdi International Airport (14 km from temple), and by Sainagar Shirdi Railway Station. Regular buses and private vehicles connect Shirdi with Mumbai, Pune, Nashik and other major cities.

== See also ==
- Sai Baba of Shirdi
- Shirdi
- Kopargaon
- Shani shingnapur
- Ahilyanagar
- Maharashtra
