= Ghatikachala =

Hill in Tamil Nadu, India

Gatikachala is a hill near Sholingur in the Ranipet district of Tamil Nadu, India. It is a Hindu pilgrimage center and the site of an ancient temple dedicated to the God Narasimha. Lord Narasimha is the fourth incarnation (avatar) of the God Vishnu.

The name of this place is Kadigachalam as known from ancient legend. Kadigai is the name of a period of Time. Sholingur is famous for the temples at its outskirts – one of Sri Yoga Narasimha Swami located on the top of the hill Ghatikachala and another of Sri Yoga Anjaneyar Swami. Tirukkadikai (Sholingur or Cholasimhapuram) is one of the 108 Divya Desams - sacred places of Vaishnava Sect in Hinduism. Both the temples are located on two hillocks.

== Yoga Anjaneyar ==
It is believed that Indirathuyman, the King of North Madurai killed the Asuran Nikumban and saved the Country Since, he helped the rishis and bhaktas, he was given the Vajrayudham by Indiran (Weapon of Indiran). Yoga Narasimhar asked Anjaneyar(Hanuman) to help him and after the asura was killed, Anjaneyar was asked to stay in the hills to give boons to his devotees, in his yoga nithrai (posture). Sacred Thirumanjanam and poojas are performed for Lord Anjaneyar on all Sundays as the killing of the asura took place on a Sunday. The Brahma theertham well, which is full of water rich in minerals, gives cure for many diseases.

The Hanumath Jayanthi festival is celebrated in a very grand manner here. Large number of devotees visit the Smaller Hillock of the Anjaneyar Temple during this occasion. Anjaneyar, sitting in Yoga Muthra is facing the west, where the Yoga Narasimhar is in his abode.

== Legend ==
After killing the mighty demon Hiranyakashipu (asura), Lord Narasimha couldn't contain his anger and Lord Shiva only came to his help. To make Prahalaada happy, Yoga Narasimhar gave his seva for 1 Kadigai in Yoga Nilai (Bigger Hillock). Because of this, the place is also called as "Kadikasalam".

== Festivals ==
Sri Bhaktavatsala Perumal (Thakkan), Periyapiratiyar and Bhoomi piratiyar are found in Bhoga stage (Dhyanam stage) in the temple in Malai Adivaaram (foot hill). There are separate sannadhis for Andal, Alwars, Garuda Vagana Varadharaja Perumal, Erumbiyapa and Thottacharyaar. Both the God's in Periyamala and Chinnamala, Narasimar and Aajaneyar are in Santha Nilais (Yoga Stage). All Utsavams are conducted to Sri Bhakthavatsalar of the temple . Special Poojas for Thayaar (Amritha Valli) on every Friday are performed.

Distances from Major Towns

Town	Distance (km)
Chennai	110
Vellore	50
Thiruttani	27
Arakkonam	27

== See also ==
- Narasimha
