= Raghunath Temple, Devprayag =

Hindu temple in Devprayag, Tehri Garhwal district, Uttarakhand, India

Raghunathji Temple
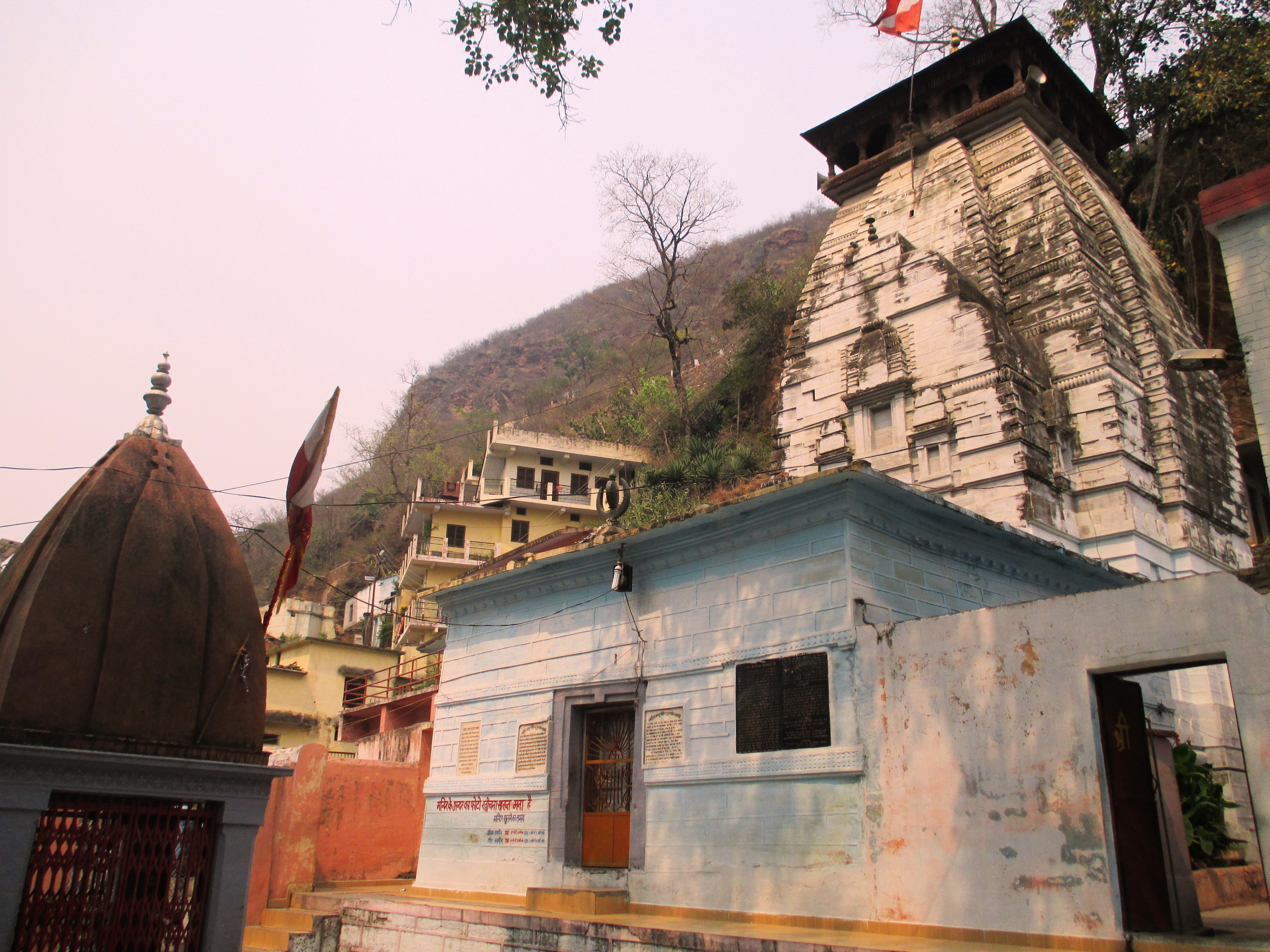

- Location in Uttarakhand

Religion
- Affiliation: Hinduism
- District: Tehri Garhwal
- Deity: Raghunathji (Rama)

Location
- Location: Devprayag
- State: Uttarakhand
- Country: India
- Interactive map of Raghunathji Temple
- Coordinates: 30°08′44″N 78°33′52″E

Architecture
- Type: Dravidian architecture

Raghunathji Temple (also called Tirukantamenum Kadi Nagar) in Devprayag, a pilgrimage town in Tehri Garhwal district in Himalayas in the North Indian state of Uttarakhand, is dedicated to Vishnu. It is located 73 km from Rishikesh on the Rishikesh–Badrinath highway. Constructed in the Deula style, the temple is glorified in the Nalayira Divya Prabandham, the early medieval Tamil canon of the Alvar saints from the 6th–9th centuries CE. It is one of the 108 Divyadesam dedicated to Vishnu, who is worshipped as Raghunathji (Rama) and his consort Lakshmi as Sita.

The temple was originally believed to have been established by Adi Shankara during the 8th century, with later expansions by the Garhwal Kingdom. The temple is located uphill on the confluence of the Alaknanda and Bhagirathi rivers, which becomes the river Ganga subsequently. Raghunathji is believed to have performed penance at this place to relieve himself of the curse committed by killing Ravana. The temple is maintained and administered by the Uttarakhand Tourism Development Board of the Government of Uttarakhand.

Its believed that the mythical river Sarasvati flows directly under the deity at the temple. At times there is a small pool of water near the deity.

== Legend ==
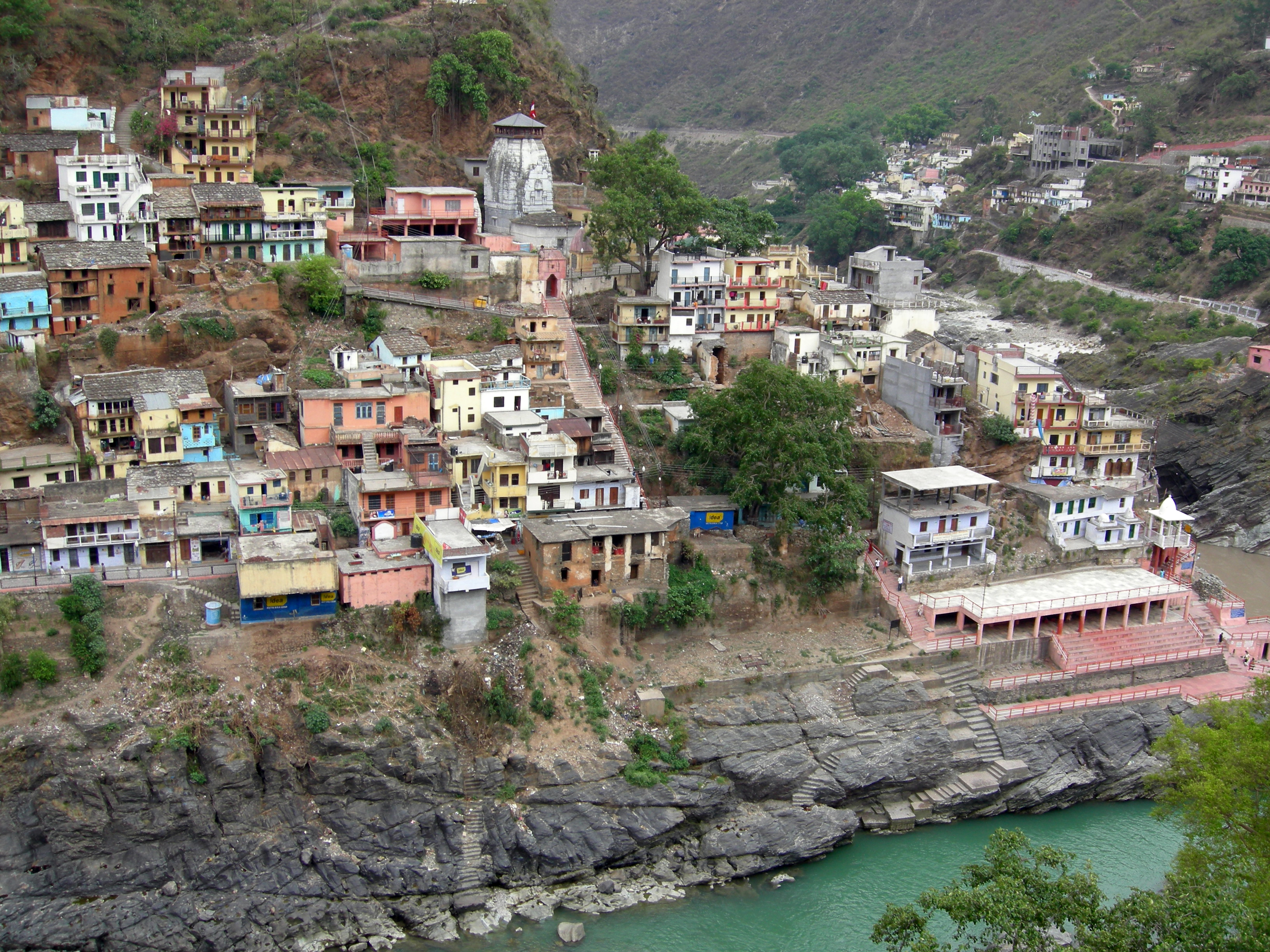
Image of the temple on the hill

As per Hindu legend, the temple is associated with the times of Ramayana. Raghunathji (Rama, an avatar of Vishnu) is believed to perform penance at this place to relieve himself off the curse committed by killing Ravana, a Brahmin rakshasa king. While Rama was offering his prayers in the waters of Devaprayag, Pushpamala came to Rama for rescue. Rama killed the makara that was troubling her with his sword. Soon after killing, the sword went to heaven. Brahma, the Hindu god of creation, is once believed to have performed penance at this place and the place came to be known as Prayaga, meaning the best place to do penance. As per the same legend, the Vataka tree (Banyan tree) in the place would withstand all earthly disasters and would remain through ages. Vishnu is believed to reside in the leaves of the tree. The Pandavas performed penance at this place before the Mahabharata war. Sage Bharadvaja is also believed to have performed penance at this place and became of the seven sacred sages, the Saptarishis.

== Architecture ==
Raghunathji temple is located in Devprayag, a town in Tehri Garhwal district in the North Indian state of Uttarakhand. It is located 73 km (45 mi) from Rishikesh on the Rishikesh - Badarinath highway in the lower Himalayas, 1,700 ft (520 m) above sea level. It is located on the confluence of Alaknanda - Bhagirathi river, 618 m (0.618 km) above the sea level. The temple has a single precinct and all the shrines are enclosed in an enclosures. There are a number of smaller shrines in the temple for Badrinath, Adi Shankara, Shiva, Sita and Hanuman around the central shrine. The central shrine houses the image of Raghunathji, a granite image in standing posture. The central shrine has a Deula, the conical roof over the sanctum. Devaprayag is located at an altitude of 618 m (2,028 ft) from the mean sea level.

== History ==
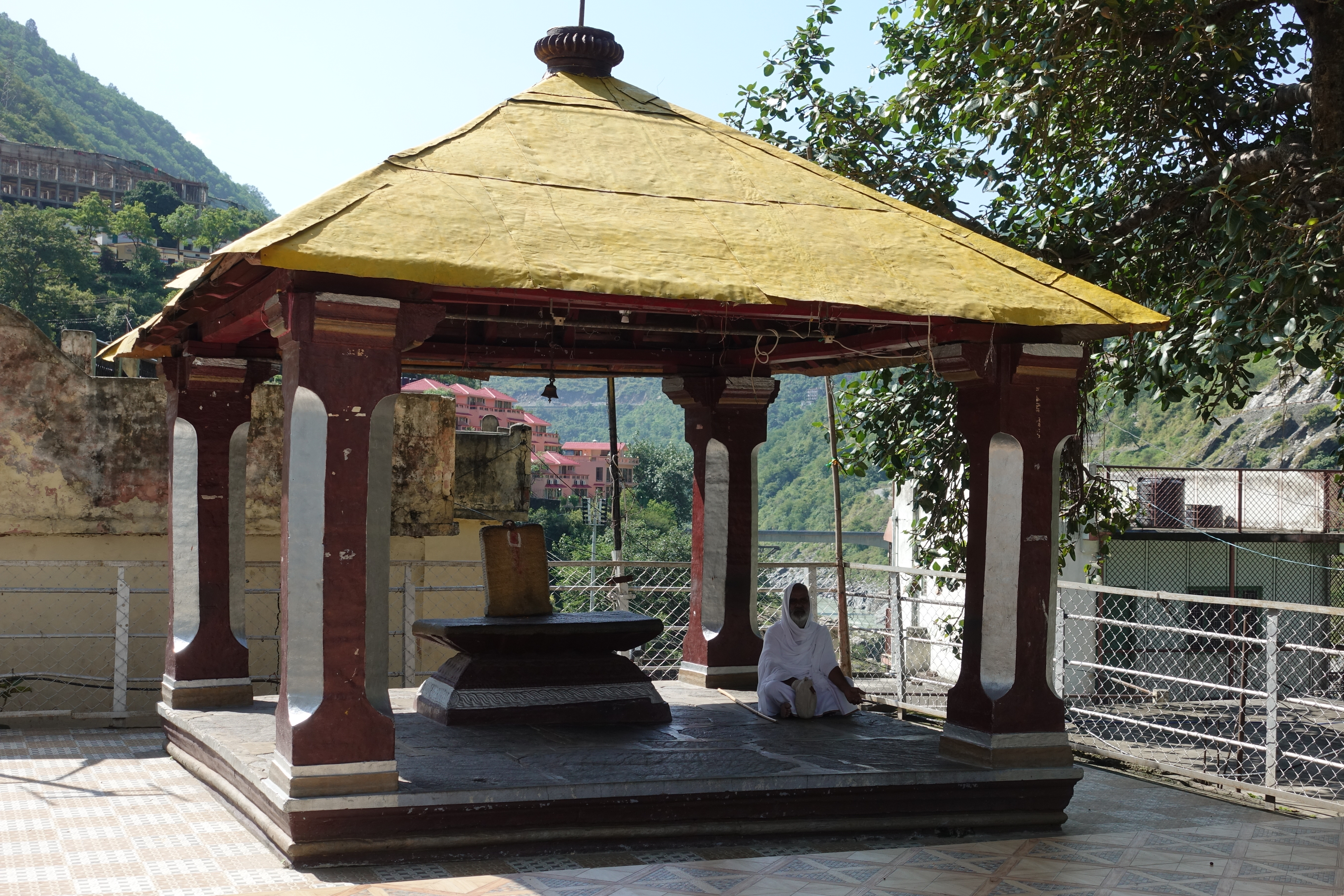
This is the place where Raghunathji is believed to have performed penance after killing Ravana

The temple is originally in existence from the 9th to 10th century. The temple was originally believed to have been established by Adi Shankara during the 8th century, with later expansions by the Garhwal Kingdom. Garhwal (also the ruling dynasty), the region in Himalayas, where the temple is located, is referred with the name for the first time in a copper plate inscription in the temple from the period of Raja Man Shah during 1610. The temple received contributions from other rulers of the dynasty like Sahaj Pal, who donated a bell to the temple in 1551, as indicated by the inscriptions in the temple. Man Shah, the other ruler of the dynasty made contributions and is indicted in the inscriptions from 1610 CE. The region was ruled by Raja Prithvi Pat Shah as seen from the inscriptions in the door and doorways in the temple dated to 1664. King Jai Kirthi Shah who ruled the region during 1780, ended his life in the temple as he was betrayed by his courtsmen.

It was damaged during an earthquake during 1893 and was built by the local king subsequently. In modern times, the temple is maintained and administered by the Uttarakhand Tourism Development Board of the Government of Uttarakhand.

== Religious significance ==
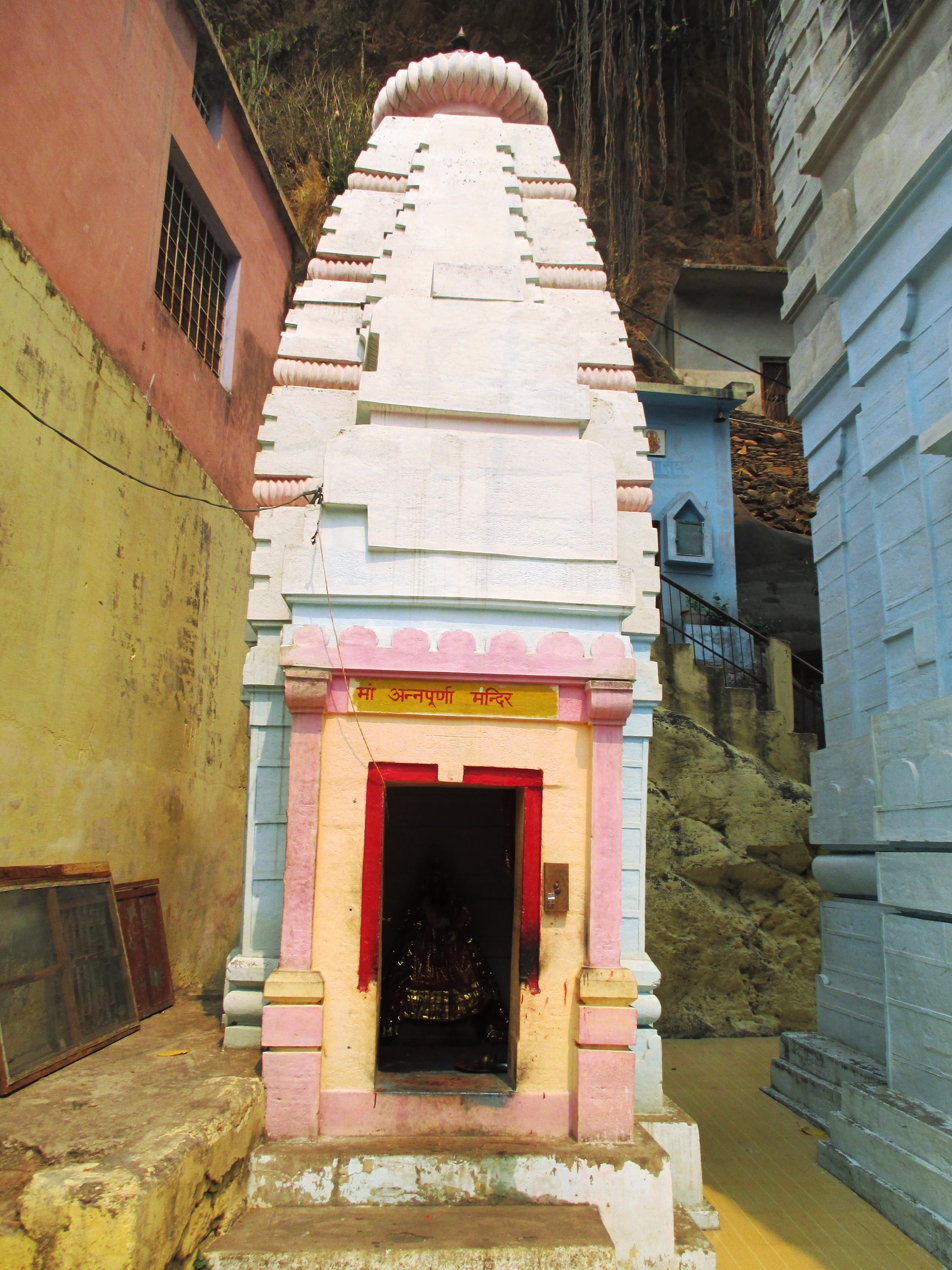
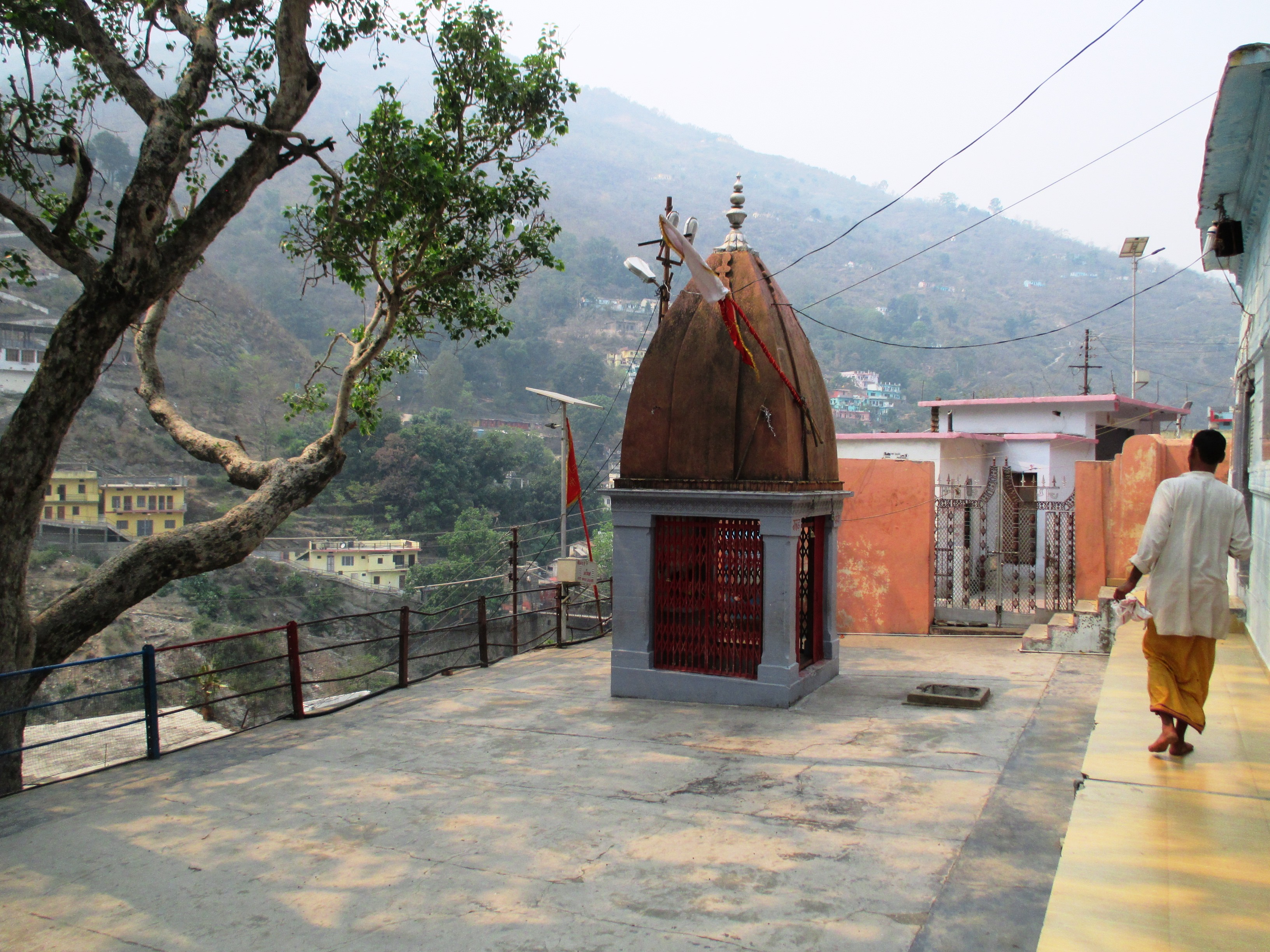
Shrines of the temple

Devaprayag, the confluence where the temple is located, is counted out as one of the five famous confluences of Ganga in the Himalayas, called Panch Prayag. These are centres of great religious influence and prominent pilgrimage centres. The temple finds mention in four of the eighteen sacred Puranas, namely the Padma Purana, Matsya Purana, Kurma Purana and Agni Purana. The temple is revered in Nalayira Divya Prabandham, the 7th–9th century Vaishnava canon, by Peyalvar, Nammalvar, Thirumangai Alvar and Thirumalisai Alvar. The temple is classified as a Divya Desam, one of the 108 Vishnu temples that are mentioned in the book. The temple along with Devaprayag was originally a larger pilgrimage centre before the 19th century. On account of increased connectivity for Badrinath Temple in modern times, the temple has turned into a secondary pilgrimage centre. It is believed that Adi Shankara, the proponent of Advaita philosophy established the temple. A shrine is dedicated to him in the temple.
