= Bagdana =

Village in Bhavnagar district, Gujarat, India

Bagdana is a village in Mahuva taluka of Bhavnagar district, Gujarat, India.

== History ==
The station of the Great Trigonometrical Survey on the Ghebar hill was close to the village.

== Places of interest ==
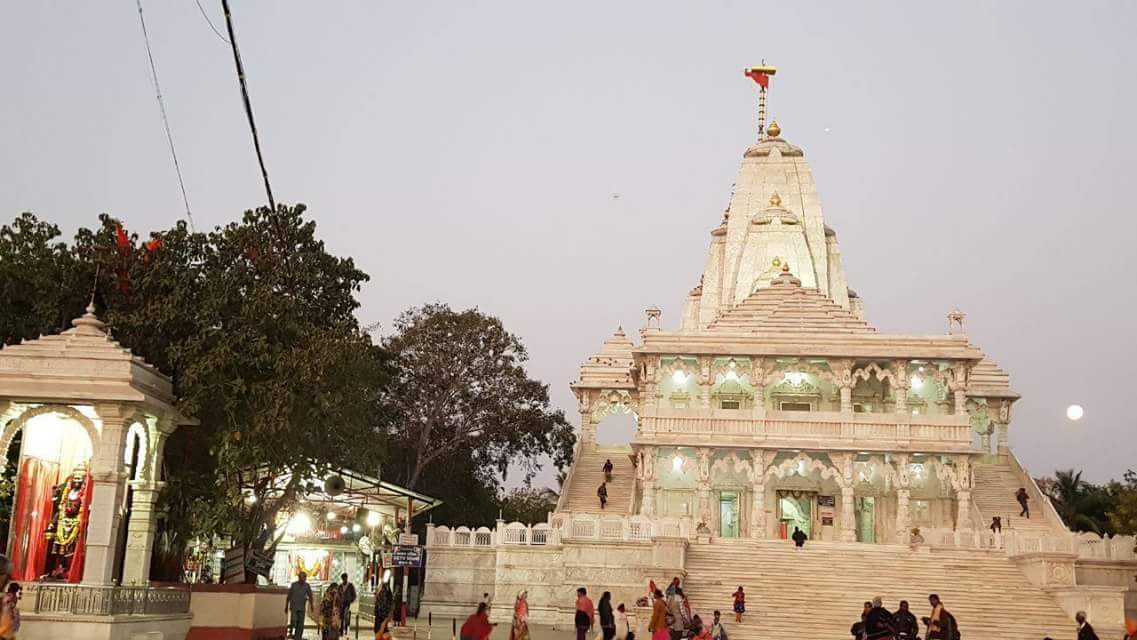
Bajarangdas Bapa temple

The village is a major pilgrim place for the followers of Hindu saint, Bajrangdas Bapa. Initially there was a hut dedicated to him which is now expanded into an Ashram.

There are three major melas (fairs) organized here annually, on death anniversary of Bajrandas Bapa, Bhadrapad Amavasya and Guru Purnima.

There is a kund (well) in Bagdana called the Gangajalia Kund at the ancient temple of Shiva known as Bagadeshwar Mahadev. The kund is actually a formation by three rivers namely Bagad, Hadamtaalu and Saraswati. The Saraswati is said to be sourced underneath the Self evolved(Swaymbhu) Linga out of two lingas inside the temple. On the festival of Balev(Rakhi Bandhan), Brahmins of Bagdana and around gather at this ancient Bagadeshwar Mahadeva temple for the ritual of Transformation(Shuddhikaran) of Sacred thread(Yajno Pavita) and take the holy bath in Gangajalia Kund praying for the societal welfare. The Bagad river which is the main waterbody flows past Datha, rises in the jungles of Dareda, Ghebar near Bagdana and ends in Gopnath.

All these places - the village itself, the rivers and sangam, the Bagdeshwar temple, Bapa's hermitage and ashram - are considered sacred by the followers of Bapa.
