= Panch Prayag =

Five sacred river confluences in Uttarakhand, India

Panch Prayag (Pañcha prayāga) is an expression in Hindu religious ethos, specifically used to connote the five sacred river confluences in the Garhwal Himalayas in the state of Uttarakhand, India. The five prayags - prayaga meaning "place of confluence of rivers" in Sanskrit - also termed as "Prayag pentad" are Vishnuprayag, Nandaprayag, Karnaprayag, Rudraprayag and Devprayag, in the descending flow sequence of their occurrence.

Alaknanda + Dhauliganga = Vishnu Prayag

Alaknanda + Nandakini = Nand Prayag

Alaknanda + Pindarganga = Karna Prayag

Alaknanda + Mandakini = Rudra Prayag

Alaknanda + Bhagirathi = Dev Prayag

== Path ==
The three most holy rivers, Ganga, Yamuna and Sarasvati, originate in this area. According to the holy texts the river Sarasvati too was a tributary of Ganga and used to join it at the Triveni Sangam in Prayagraj along with Yamuna. But, the Mahabharat mentions that it later dried. Today Sarasvati joins Alaknanda at Keshav Prayag in Mana village before the confluence of Dhauliganga and Alaknanda at Vishnu Prayag. But Keshav Prayag is not included in the list of the Panch Prayag, hence it starts with the Vishnu Prayag on the Alaknanda River, which is one of the two source streams of the river Ganga in the Garhwal Himalayas; the other streams are the Dhauliganga, Nandakini, Pindar, Mandakini and the Bhagirathi - the head stream of the Ganges.

The five Prayags in Uttarakhand

Alaknanda descending from the foot of the Satopanth (a triangular lake, which is located at a height of 4,402 m (14,442.3 ft), above the sea level and named after the Hindu trinity: Brahma, Vishnu, Shiva and Bhagirath Kharak glaciers near the Nanda Devi peak, in Uttarakhand cascades over a length of 229 km (142.3 mi) encompassing the five prayags and is joined at Dev Prayag by the Bhagirathi, a shorter river source vis-à-vis Alaknanda to form the main stream of the Ganges. It flows down south towards Rishikesh and Haridwar, two holy places on the bank of the Ganges in Uttarakhand.

At each of the confluences, with large influx of pilgrims who visit the state for the pilgrimage of the Panch Kedar and Sapta Badri temples, large religious towns have developed. Pilgrims take a dip in the river at these locations before embarking on visiting the holy shrines in the "Deva Bhumi" (god's land) as Uttarakhand is commonly known. The religious towns are named after the confluence sites as: Devaprayag, Nandprayag, Karnaprayag, Rudraprayag, except Vishnuprayag, where there is no town but it is about 12 km (7.5 mi) from Joshimath town another famous Hindu religious centre), along a winding road that further leads to Badrinath Temple and beyond. Some pilgrims do ablution at all the five prayags before worshiping Vishnu at Badrinath.

== Meaning ==
Prayag in Hindu tradition signifies confluence of two or more rivers where ablutions (bathing) before worship, religious rites called the Shraddha (the last rites) for the departed and worship of the river itself as manifestation of God are a prevalent practice. While the Prayag at Prayagraj (King of Prayags), where the three rivers namely, the Ganges, the Yamuna and the Sarasvati confluence, is considered the holiest, the Panch Prayag of Garhwal Himalayas are the next in the order of piety. The Prayags are rich not only with stories from puranas and legend but also in scenic beauty of the Himalayan snow-covered peaks and enchanting valleys. It is also deduced that the Panch Prayag located on the road to Badrinath refer to the Svargarohana (ascend to heaven) route followed by the Pandavas to attain salvation after they completed circumambulation of the earth.

== Description of the five Prayags ==
People of Garhwal, in particular, gather at the five prayags during Makara Sankranthi, Uttarayan, Basant Panchami and Ram Navami festivals for a holy dip in the sacred river confluences.

=== Vishnuprayag ===
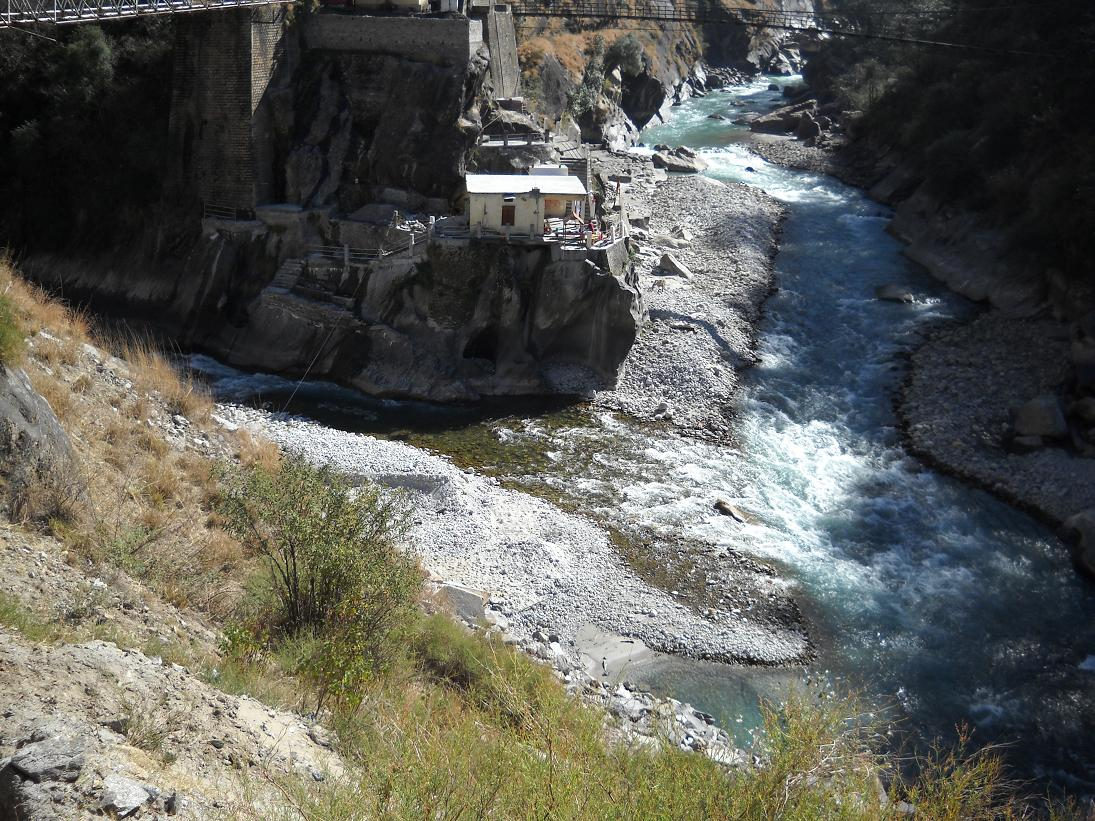
Confluence of the Dhauliganga (right) with the Alaknanda (left) at Vishnuprayag

The Alaknanda River, which originates from Satopanth glacier is joined by the Dhauliganga river near Joshimath (on Joshimath - Badrinath route). Alaknanda flows in front of the Badrinath temple, one of the most revered Hindu shrines. Dhauli Ganga originates from the Niti Pass, after traveling a distance of 25 km (15.5 mi) from its source to the Vishnu Prayag (30°33′45″N 79°34′31″E). This stretch of the Alaknanda River is called the Vishnu Ganges. Legend narrates the worship offered by sage Narada to god Vishnu at this confluence. An octagonal shaped temple - located near the confluence - dated to 1889, is credited to Maharani of Indore - Ahalyabai. It houses a Vishnu image. A stairway from this temple leads to the Vishnu kund (kund means pool of water or lake) at the confluence, which is seen in a tranquil state.

=== Nandaprayag ===
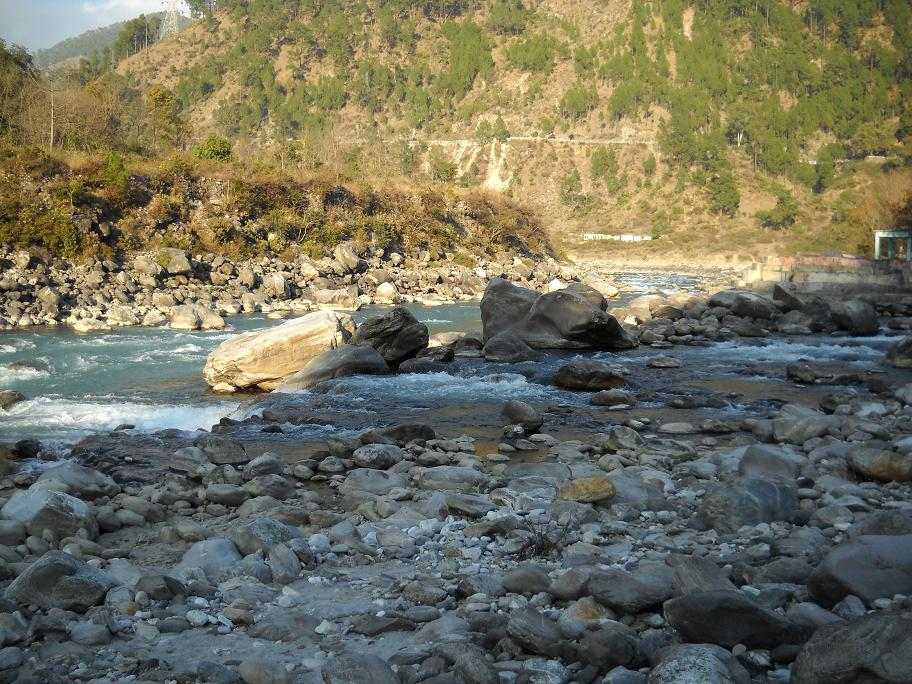
The Nandakini River (foreground) meets the Alaknanda River (background) in Nandprayag, in the Garhwal Himalayas, Uttarakhand, India.

Nand Prayag (30°19′56″N 79°18′55″E) is the second prayag in the cascade sequence of the confluences where the Nandakini river joins the main Alaknanda River. According to one tale, a noble King Nanda performed Yagnya (fire-sacrifice) and sought blessings of God. Hence, the confluence is named after him. The other version of the legend states that the confluence derives its name from the Yadava king Nanda, the foster-father of god Krishna. According to the legend, Vishnu granted a boon of the birth of a son to Nanda and his wife Yashoda and also the same boon to Devaki, wife of Vasudeva. Placed in a dilemma, since both were his disciples, he ensured that Krishna, an incarnation of Vishnu, was born to Devaki and Vasudeva but was fostered by Yashoda and Nanda. There is temple for Gopal, a form of Krishna, here. The legends also narrate that sage Kanva did penance here and also that wedding of King Dushyanta and Shakuntala took place at this venue.

=== Karnaprayag ===
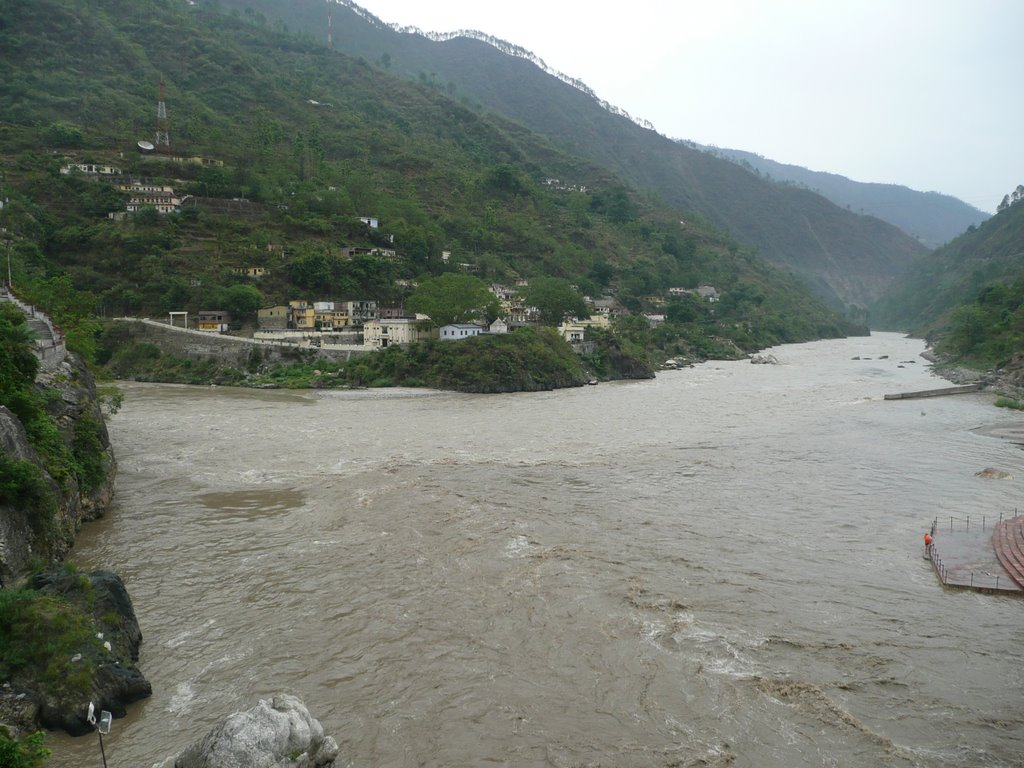
Karna Prayag confluence of Alaknanda and Pindar Rivers

Karn Prayag (30°15′49″N 79°12′56″E) is the location where Alaknanda River is joined by the Pindar River that originates from the Pindar glacier, below the Nanda Devi Mountain range. The epic Mahabharata narrates that Karna did penance here and pleased the Surya (sun-god). In return, he received an impenetrable armor and a quiver of arrows that could never be exhausted. The name of the confluence is thus derived from the name of Karna.

There is reference to this site in Meghaduta, a Sanskrit lyrical poetic drama written by the legendary poet Kalidasa, which attributes that Satopanth and Bhagirath glaciers joined here to form the Pindar River. Another classic work by the same author called the Abhijnana-shakuntala also mentions that Shakuntala and king Dushyanta's romantic dalliance occurred here. More recently, Swami Vivekananda has also been said to have meditated here for eighteen days.

The stone seat where Karna did penance is also seen here. A temple built in recent times to commemorate Karna has the deity of goddess Uma Devi (daughter of the Himalayas) here. The stone temple was rebuilt by guru Adi Shankaracharya. In the sanctum, the images of goddess Parvati, her consort Shiva and her elephant-headed son Ganesha are installed, next to that of Uma Devi, apart from Karna's image. A steep row of steps from the temple along a spur leads to the confluence point. And, down these steps, small shrines of Shiva and the Binayak Shila (the Ganesha stone) - that is believed to provide protection from danger - are located. Once in 12 years, a procession of the image of Uma Devi is taken round a few villages in the sub-divisional town of Karnaprayag.

Next to the confluence site there is a large pasturage on the bank where cows are seen grazing. According to a local legend, a local zamindar (landlord) inadvertently killed a cow (go-hatya) in this pasture land, which according to Hindu religion was considered a religious offence. The contrived zamindar, who did not have adequate money to do reparatory acts to atone for this sin, requested a visiting pilgrim from South India to help him out. With the help of the philanthropic pilgrim, the zamindar bought the pasture land, dedicated it to Lord Badrinath, a form of Vishnu, with the vow that the land so acquired would be used only for the purpose of grazing by cows.

=== Rudraprayag ===
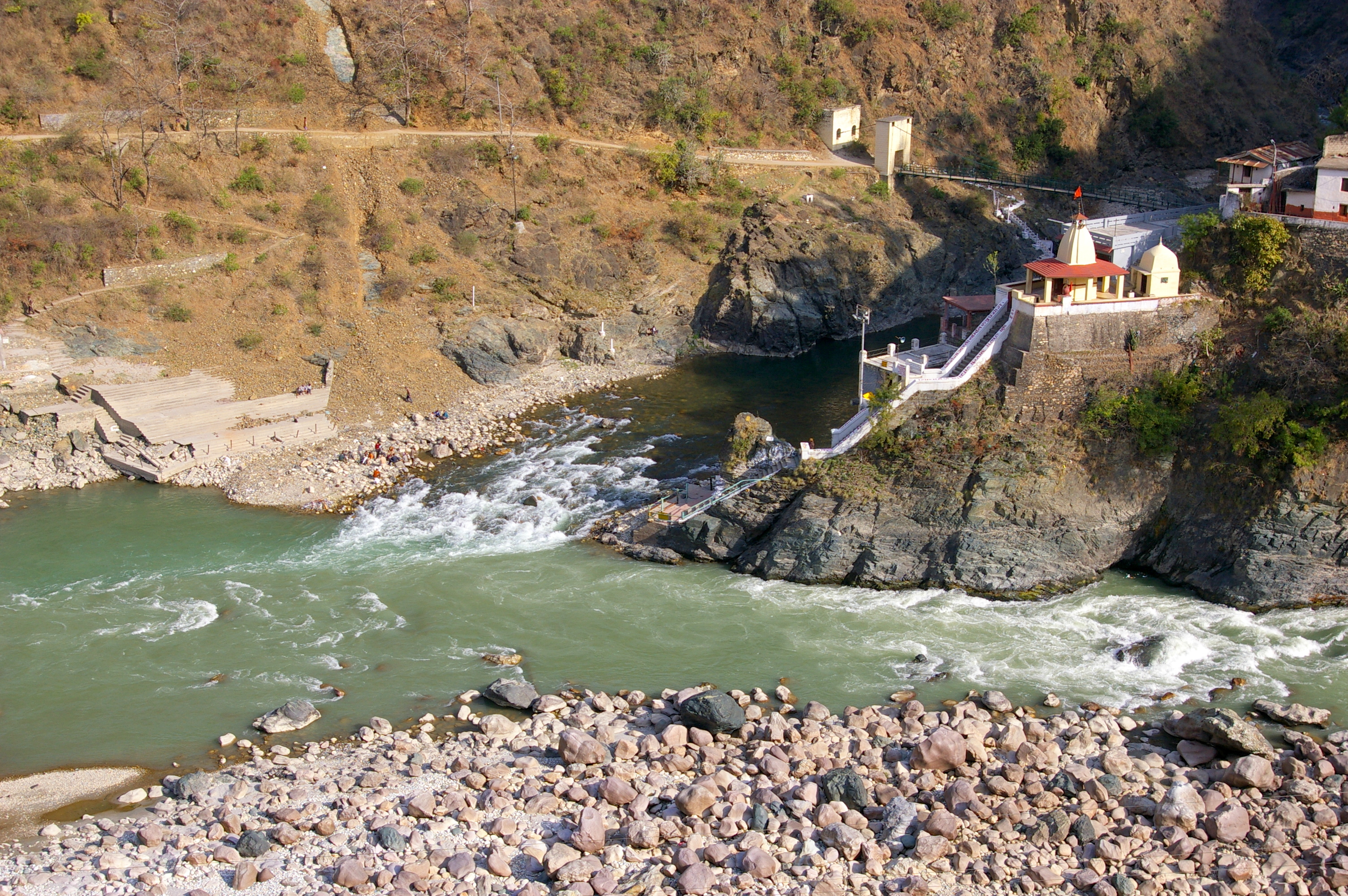
Rudraprayag, the confluence of the Alaknanda (foreground) and the Mandakini rivers.

At Rudra Prayag (30°17′16″N 78°58′43″E) the Alaknanda meets the Mandakini River. There is a temple situated above confluence named after god Shiva, who is also known as Rudra. According to a widely narrated legend, Shiva performed the Tandava here. The Tandava is a vigorous dance that is the source of the cycle of creation, preservation and dissolution. Shiva also played his favourite musical instrument the Rudra veena here. By playing the Veena, he enticed god Vishnu to his presence and converted him to water.

Another legend narrates that sage Narada performed penance here to gain musical talent. Narad eventually pleased Shiva who taught Narad music.

According to another legend, the consort of Shiva - Sati was reborn as Parvati as the daughter of Himalaya, after she self-immolated herself in protest of the insult of Shiva. In spite of Himalaya's protests, Parvati performed rigorous penance to get the boon of becoming Shiva's wife in the new birth too.

=== Devprayag ===
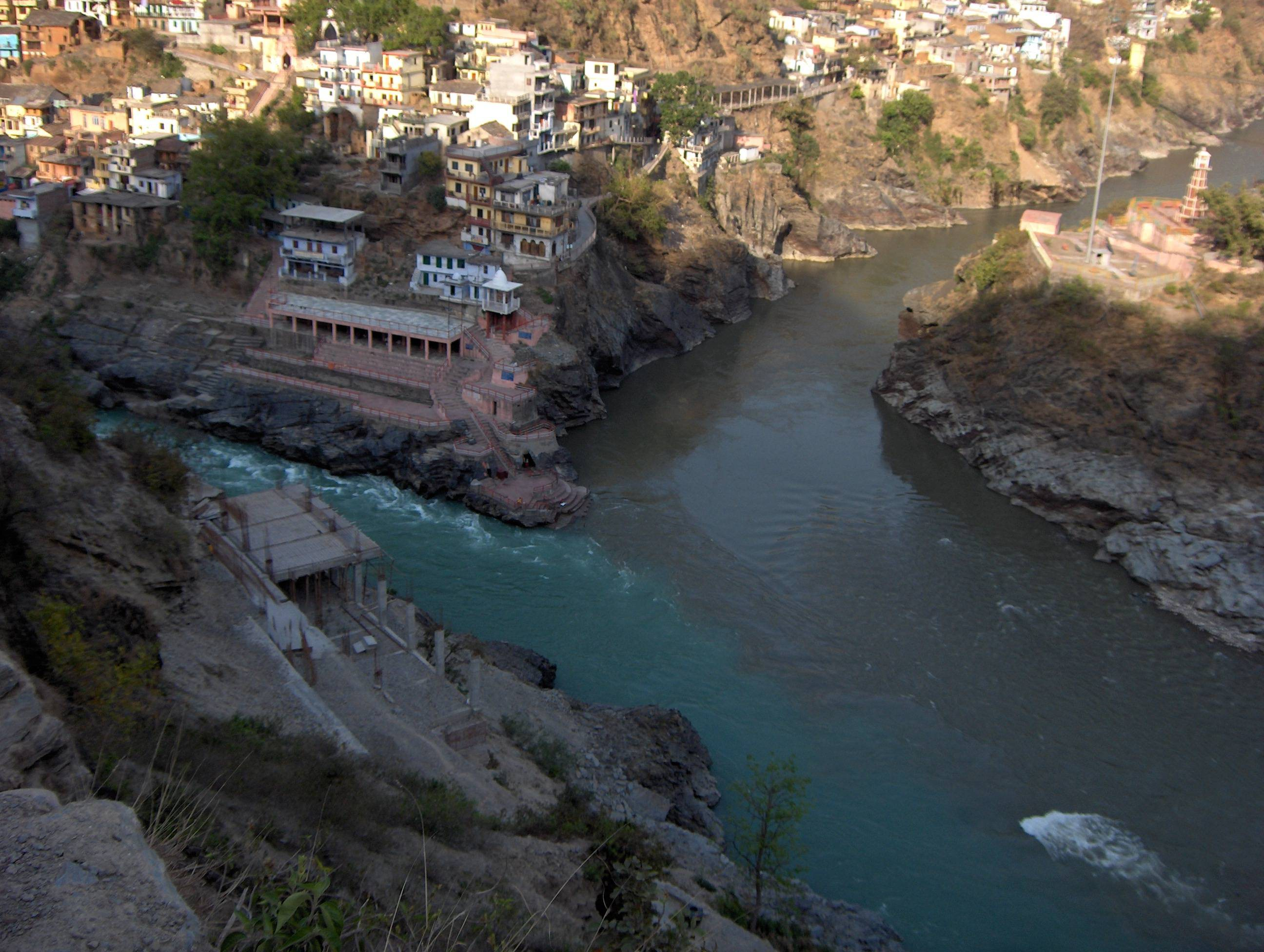
Dev Prayag - Confluence of Alakananda (right) and Bhagirathi (left) Rivers

Dev Prayag (30°08′43″N 78°35′52″E) is the confluence of the two holy rivers, the Bhagirathi - the chief stream of the Ganges and the Alaknanda. It is the first prayag on the way to Badrinath. Beyond this confluence, the river is known as Ganges. The holiness of this place is considered equal to the famous Triveni sangam confluence at Allahabad where the Ganges, Yamuna and Saraswati rivers merge.

The confluence of the Bhagirathi, which flows in rapids with strong currents meets a much calmer river in the Alaknanda and this has been vividly described by the British captain Raper as:

The contrast between the two rivers joining here is striking. The Bhaghirathi runs down a steep declivity with rapid force, roaring and foaming flowing over large fragments placed in its bed, while the placid, Alakananda, flowing, with a smooth, unruffled surface, gently winds round the point till, meeting with her turbulent consort, she is forcibly hurried down, and unites her clamours with the blustering current.

The confluence got the name tag 'Dev' from a poor Brahmin called Deva Sharma who performed "rigorous religious austerities" here and was blessed by Rama, Vishnu's incarnation and hero of the epic Ramayana. There are two Kunds or ponds on the banks of the rivers which join here, these are: the Vasistha Kund on the Bhagirathi and the Brahma Kund on the bank of the Alakananda. Legend also mentions about this site being Vishnu's navel and that Brahma meditated here.

The many legendary kings who did penance here were, Rama - to atone for his sin of killing the demon-king Ravana, a Brahmin. Legend also states that Vishnu entreated the demon-king Bali for 3 steps of land here. Legend also states that Rama, before attaining salvation, vanished from here. Vaishnavites consider it as one of the 108 Divya Desams (sacred abodes of Vishnu) for undertaking a pilgrimage during their lifetime.

A famous temple dedicated to Rama called the Raghunath Math is located above the confluence. A 15 ft (4.6 m) high, black granite image of Rama is worshipped here as the central icon. It is believed to be installed in the temple about 1250 years ago. A Shiva temple is also located nearby.

Ancient stone inscriptions have also been traced here. The stone inscriptions dates the temple's existence to the first century AD. The temple, which is 72 ft (21.9 m) in height, has a quadrilateral pyramidal shape with width narrowing towards the top of the temple tower. The top is surrounded by a white cupola. The sloping roof over the cupola is supported by wooden pillars. The roof is made up of copper plates adorned by plated ball with a spire. An image of Garuda (a divine bird in human form with a beak and wings to fly, which is the vahana or vehicle of Vishnu). On the festive days of Ram Navami, Vasant Panchami and Baisakhi, which are special occasions at this temple, the god is placed on a stone shown for worship. A stairway from the temple of Deva Prayag of Panch Prayag, leads to the confluence of Bhagirathi and Alakananda rivers where a distinct demarcation of the churning muddy stream of Alakananda mix with the saffron clear flows of Bhagirathi is seen (see picture in infobox) to evolve as Ganges, the holiest river for Hindus. Brahmins and pilgrims offer food to the fish species Cyprinus denticulatus (4–5 ft (1.2–1.5 m) length) at this site.

== Access ==
Access to the five confluence locations on the Rishikesh-Badrinath highway is reckoned from Rishikesh, which is the gateway to the Garhwal Himalayas. Rishikesh is a rail head that connects to all parts of the country and the nearest airport. Jolly Grant Airport is 18 km (11.2 mi) from Rishikesh, and 25 km (15.5 mi) from Dehradun.

The distances from Rishikesh to the five prayags are:

- 256 km (159.1 mi) to Vishnu Prayag via Joshimath which is13 km (8.1 mi) away;
- 190 km (118.1 mi) to Nanda Prayag;
- 169 km (105.0 mi) to Karna Prayag;
- 140 km (87.0 mi) to Rudra Prayag; and
- 70 km (43.5 mi) to Dev Prayag.

Appropriate time to visit the Panch Prayag Panch Prayag lies in one of high mountains of Himalayas, with low temperatures all through the year so it's better to give them a miss during winters, when it gets very cold. All the Prayags can be reached by road throughout the year.

== See also ==
- 2013 North India floods

== See also ==
- Panch Kedar
- Chhota Char Dham
