= Greenvein =

Indian nonprofit organization

- Formation: 2014, Eranakulam
- Type: Non-governmental organization
- Headquarters: Eranakulam

Greenvein is a nonprofit organization in India for planting and protecting trees. Its vision is to reduce global warming and implement reforestation programs. The motto of the organization is to propagate a culture of planting and protecting trees and make it part of our day-to-day activity rather than a ritualistic and symbolic process.

== History ==
Greenvein's first meeting was held at Ernakulam on 6 May 2014. In this meeting a decision was made to plant and protect One Billion Trees across India within 21 years. . In order to fulfil the aim, widespread campaigns were initiated. Within a year Greenvein made its presence in Kerala, Uttar Pradesh, Delhi and Odisha. On June 5, 2014, World Environment Day, 32,200 saplings were planted in Kerala alone with the support of Ministry of Forest. On the same day saplings were planted in Dehradun, Capital city of Uttarakhand state, Jawaharlal Nehru University (JNU) Delhi, Redegg Infopark at Nagarcoil, Tamil Nadu, Niv Vidya Mandir at Greater Noida, and Navaprabhat Gurukulam, Navupauli village, Odisha.

== Activities ==
2014, Greenvein started nurseries at Haridwar, Rudraprayag, Noida and Odisha with the help of common people. In Kerala, 10 nurseries were started. In addition to this, Greenvein volunteers maintain many more small nurseries with the capacity to rear 100 saplings to 300 saplings at their homes or surroundings. These nurseries produce approximately 300, 000 saplings per year. And in various states, Greenvein has planted 600, 000 saplings within 2015. On June 5, 2015, Greenvein conducted a seed distribution campaign and distributed approximately 150, 000 seeds on that day. The project is called one billion tree project.

== Tree Trip ==
Tree Trip is a campaign in the leadership of Swami Samvidanand, Chief Coordinator of Greenvein to create awareness on the necessity of planting and protecting trees and to plant seeds and saplings in every single district of India . This " Himalaya to Kanyakumari" Tree Trip started from Himalaya on 7 May 2015. Swami Samvidanand leads this journey in a Maruti Alto car. The trip associates with bodies such as Environmental and Ecological organizations, Eco Clubs of Schools and Colleges, Women Empowerment Institutions and Cultural Societies in each State. The activities of Tree Trip includes distribution of seeds, conducting awareness seminars for school and college students and the native people on the importance of environment conservation and tree planting in this era of Global warming. Greenvein initiated this project with "Karthumbikoottam" an organisation of tribal children by introducing the program to plant One Lakh trees in the banks of River Bhavani, which flows through Kerala and Tamil Nadu.
