= Nandakini =

River in Uttarakhand, India

Coordinates: 30.3319°N 79.3156°E

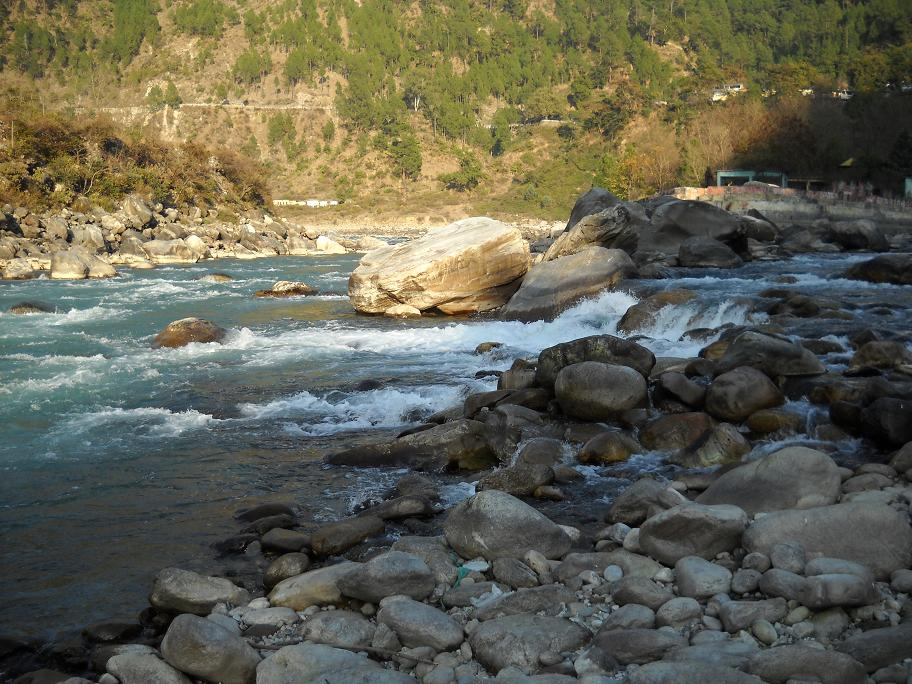
View of the confluence of the Nandakini River (foreground) and the Alaknanda River (background) at Nandprayag in the Garhwal Himalayas

Nandakini is a glacial fed river that originates on the western edge of the Nanda Ghunti peak. It is one of the six main tributaries of the Ganges. The river joins the Alaknanda at Nandprayag (870m), which is one of the panch prayags or holy confluences on the Alaknanda. Flowing through the Chamoli district of Uttarakhand, this river traverses a distance of around 105 kilometers before eventually converging with the Alaknanda River.
