= Devprayag =

Devprayag Devprayag
- Town
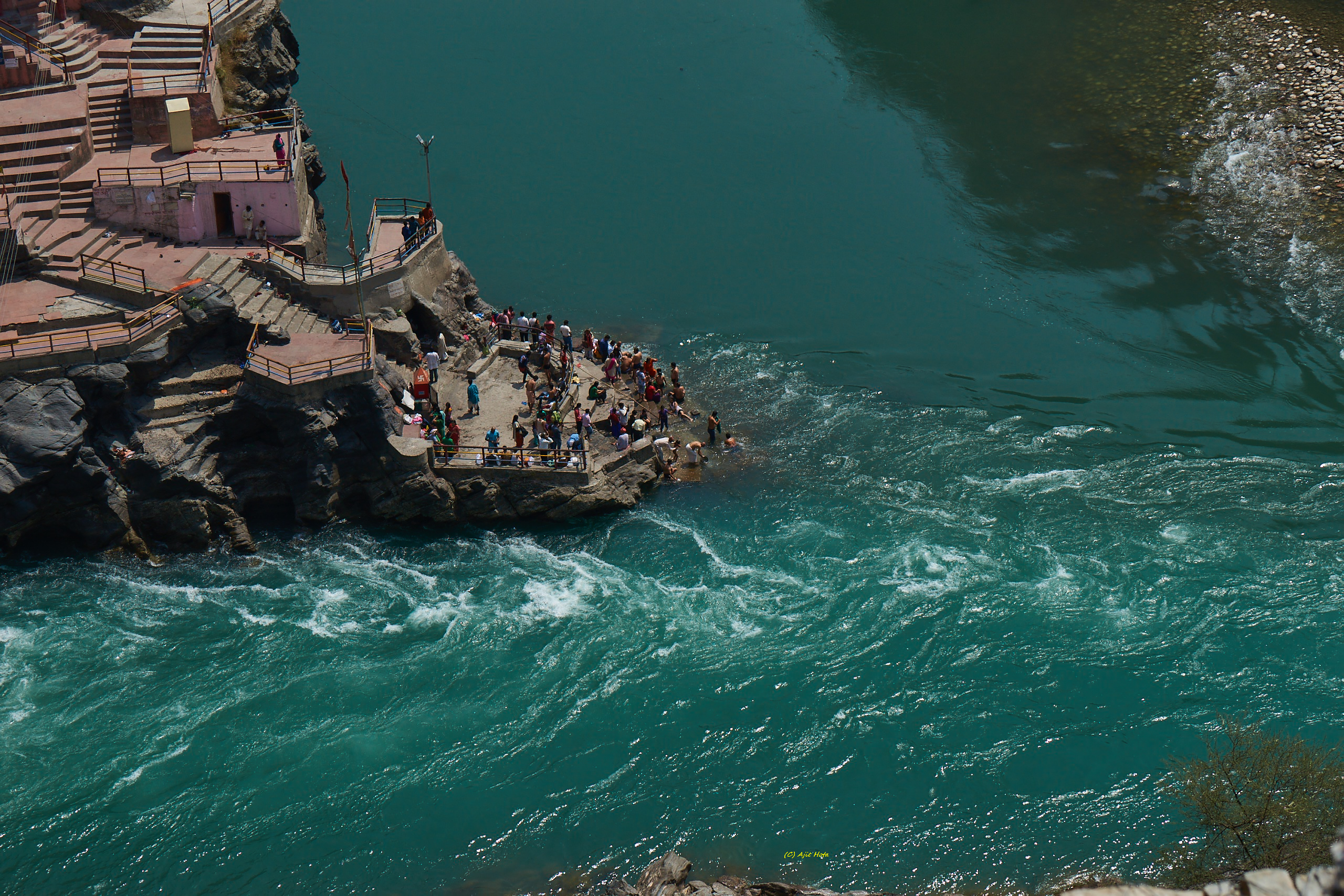
- Confluence of Alaknanda River and the Bhagirathi and the beginning of the main stem of the Ganges river, or Ganga

- Location in Uttarakhand, India Devprayag (India)
- Coordinates: 30.146°N 78.598°E
- Country: India
- State: Uttarakhand

Population
  - Total: 2,144

Devprayag (Deva prayāga) is a town and a nagar palika, near New Tehri city in Tehri Garhwal District in the state of Uttarakhand, India, and is the final one of the Panch Prayag (five confluences) of Alaknanda River where Alaknanda meets the Bhagirathi river and both rivers thereafter flow on as the Ganges river or Ganga.

== Overview ==
"Devprayag" means "Godly Confluence" in Sanskrit. According to Hindu scriptures, Devprayag is the sacred place of merging of two visible heavenly rivers, Alaknanda and Bhagirathi, to form the holy Ganges.

On a terrace in the upper part of the village is the temple of Raghunathji, built of huge stones, pyramidal in form, and capped by a white cupola. There are major four temples located on this Godly Confluence. These temples increase the spiritual importance of Devprayag.

== Geography ==
The Alaknanda rises at the confluence and feet of the Satopanth and Bhagirath Kharak glacier in Uttarakhand near the border with Tibet. The headwaters of the Bhagirathi are formed at Gaumukh, at the foot of the Gangotri glacier and Khatling glaciers in the Garhwal Himalaya. These two sacred rivers join to form the Ganges (Ganga) in Devprayag.

Devprayag is 70 km from Rishikesh. Devprayag has an average elevation of 830 metres (2,723 feet).

== Demographics ==
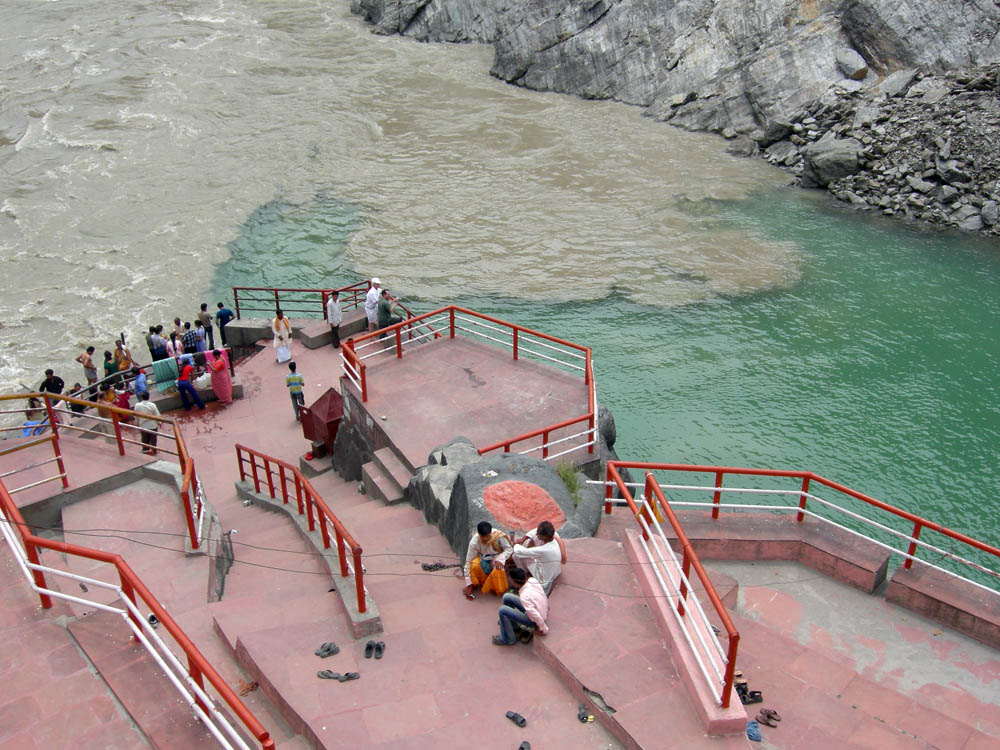
Confluence of the Alaknanda (left) and Bhagirathi (right) Rivers to form the Ganga at Devprayag

As of 2001 India census, Devprayag had a population of 2144. Males constitute 52% of the population and females 48%. Devprayag has an average literacy rate of 77%, higher than the national average of 74.5%; male literacy is 82% and, female literacy is 72%. In Devprayag, 13% of the population is under 6 years of age. The town is the seat of the pandas of the Badrinath Dham.

== In popular culture ==
Devprayag has been featured prominently in the films Kisna: The Warrior Poet and Ponga Pandit.

== Transport ==
=== Air ===
The nearest airport is the Jolly Grant Airport near Dehradun 116 km (72 mi) away.

=== Railway ===
The nearest railway stations is at Rishikesh. However, Rishikesh is a small railway station not connected by fast trains. Haridwar railway junction, 24 km farther from Rishikesh, has train connections to most of the major cities in India and is, therefore, the railhead for Devprayag.

=== Road ===
Devprayag lies on national highway NH58 that connects Delhi with Badrinath and Mana Pass in Uttarakhand near Indo-Tibet border. Therefore, all the buses and vehicles that carry pilgrims from New Delhi to Badrinath via Haridwar and Rishikesh in pilgrim season of summer months pass through Devprayag on the way to Joshimath and further north. Rishikesh is the major starting point for road journey to Devprayag and regular buses operate from Rishikesh bus station to Devprayag. The road distance from Rishikesh to Devprayag is 74 km (46 mi).

- Haridwar to Rishikesh 24 km
- Rishikesh to Devprayag 74 km
- Devprayag to Srinagar 34 km
- Srinagar to Rudraprayag 33 km

== Gallery ==
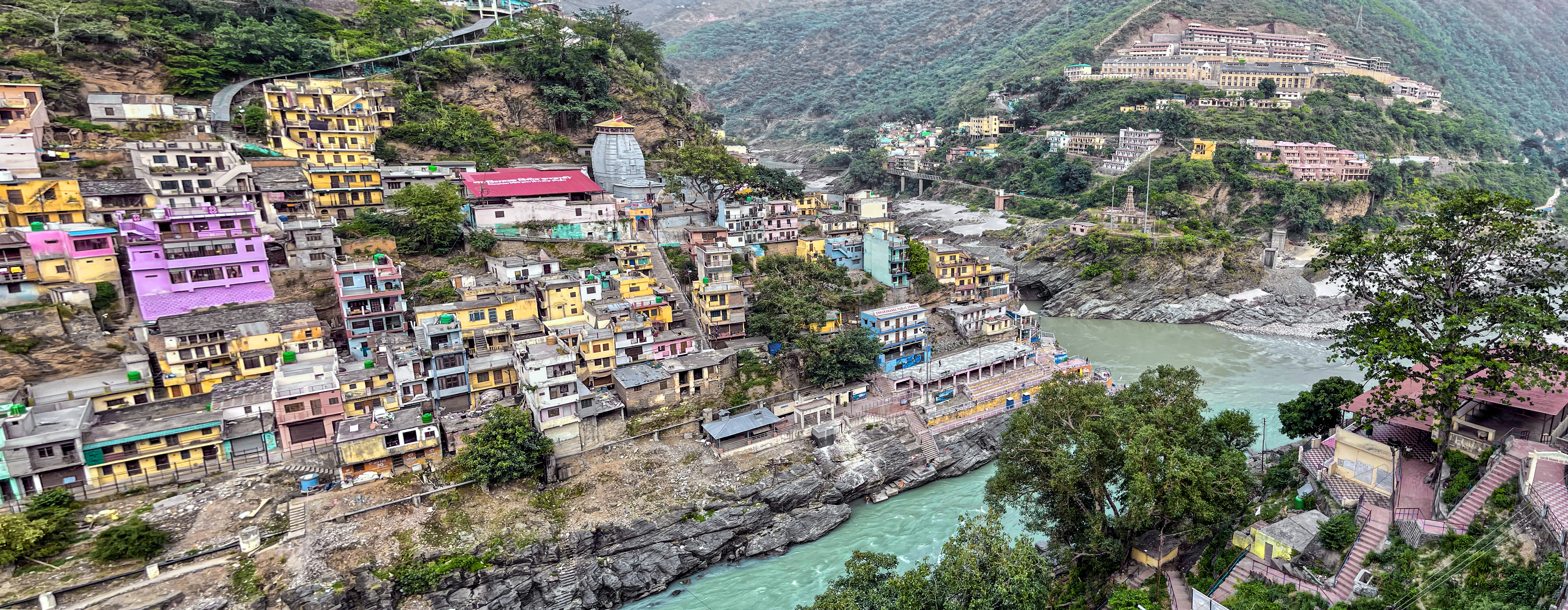
A Panoramic View of Devprayag
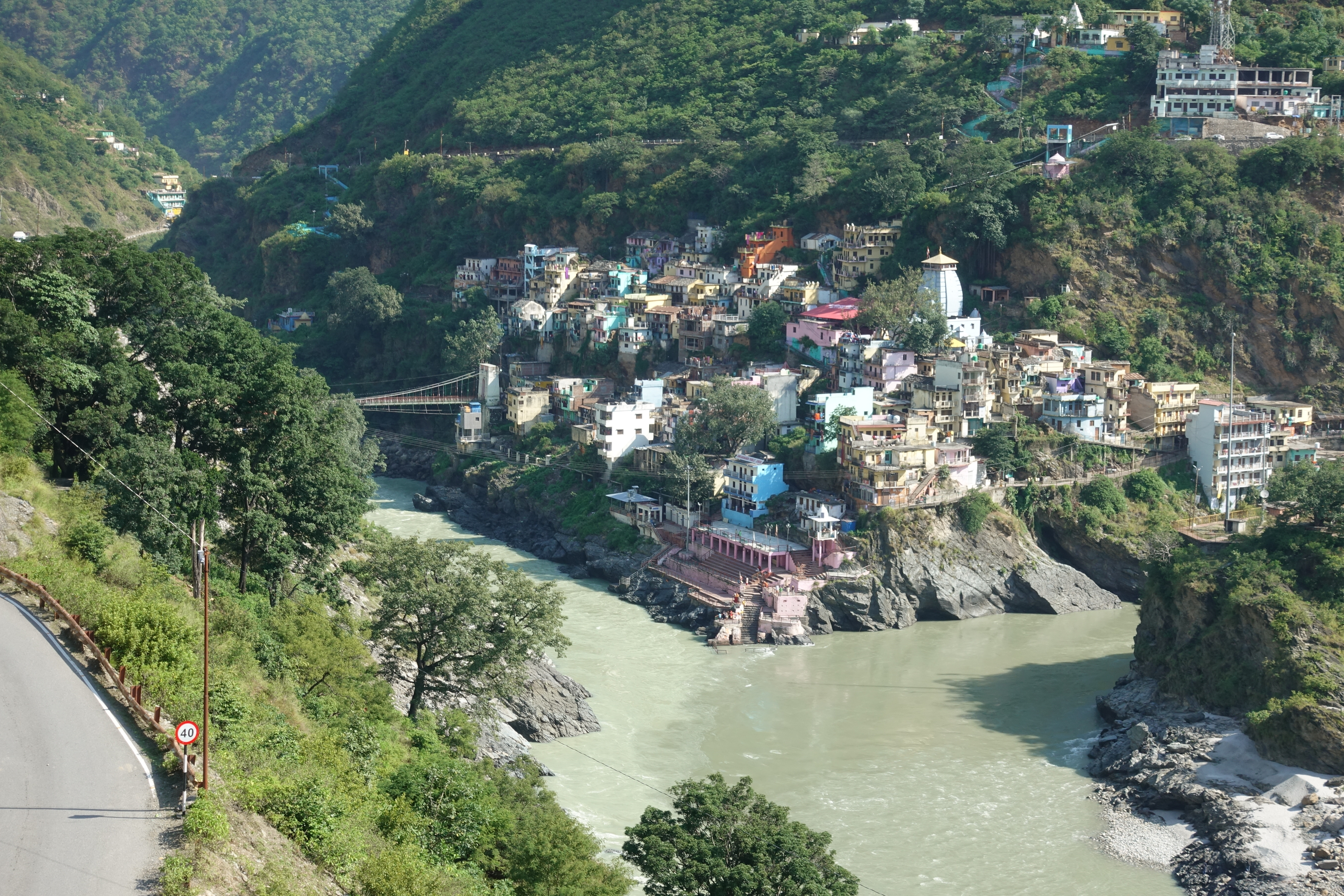
Devprayag after the monsoons in October 2019

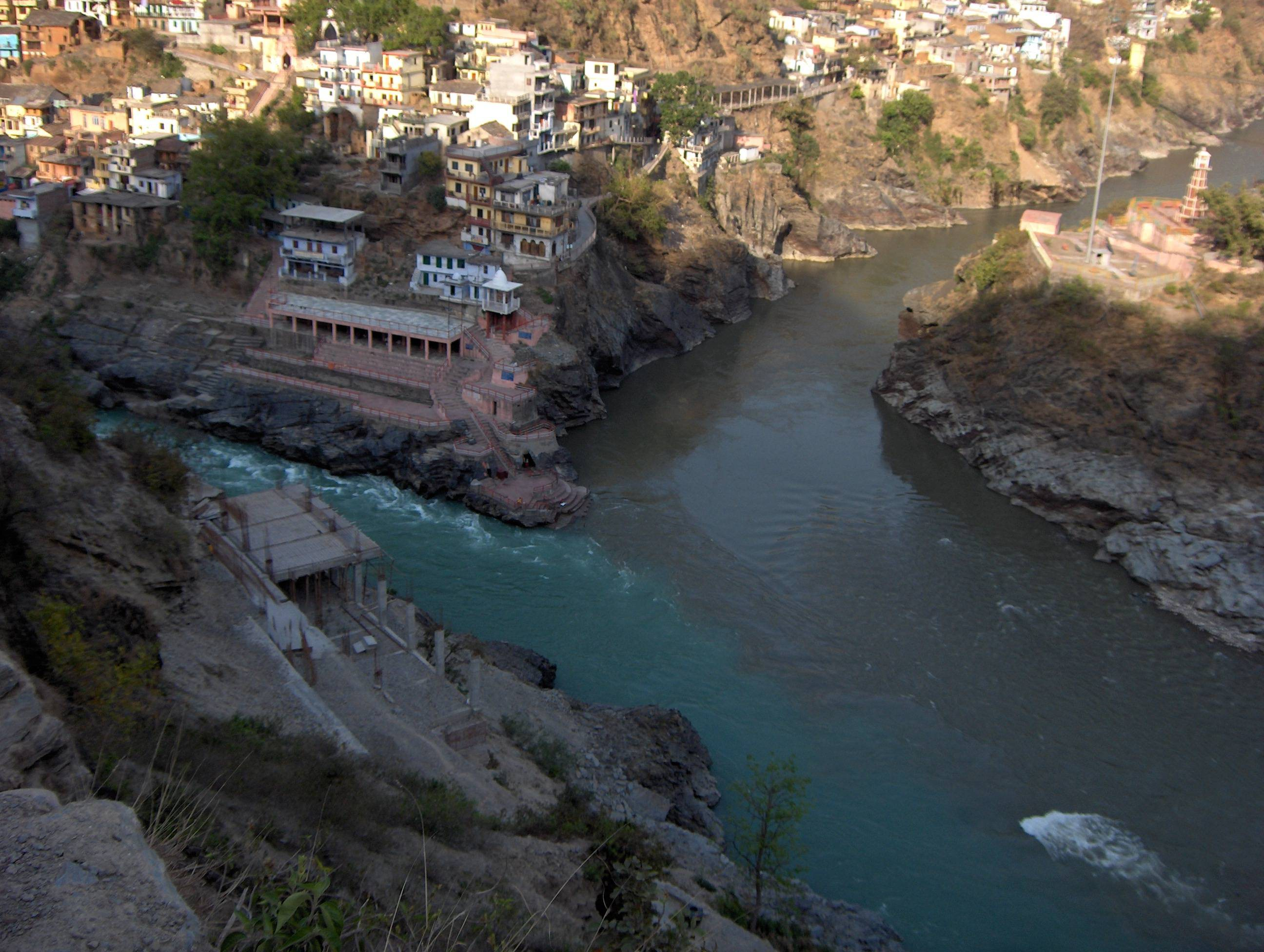
The Bhagirathi (left) joins the Alaknanda (right) at Devprayag

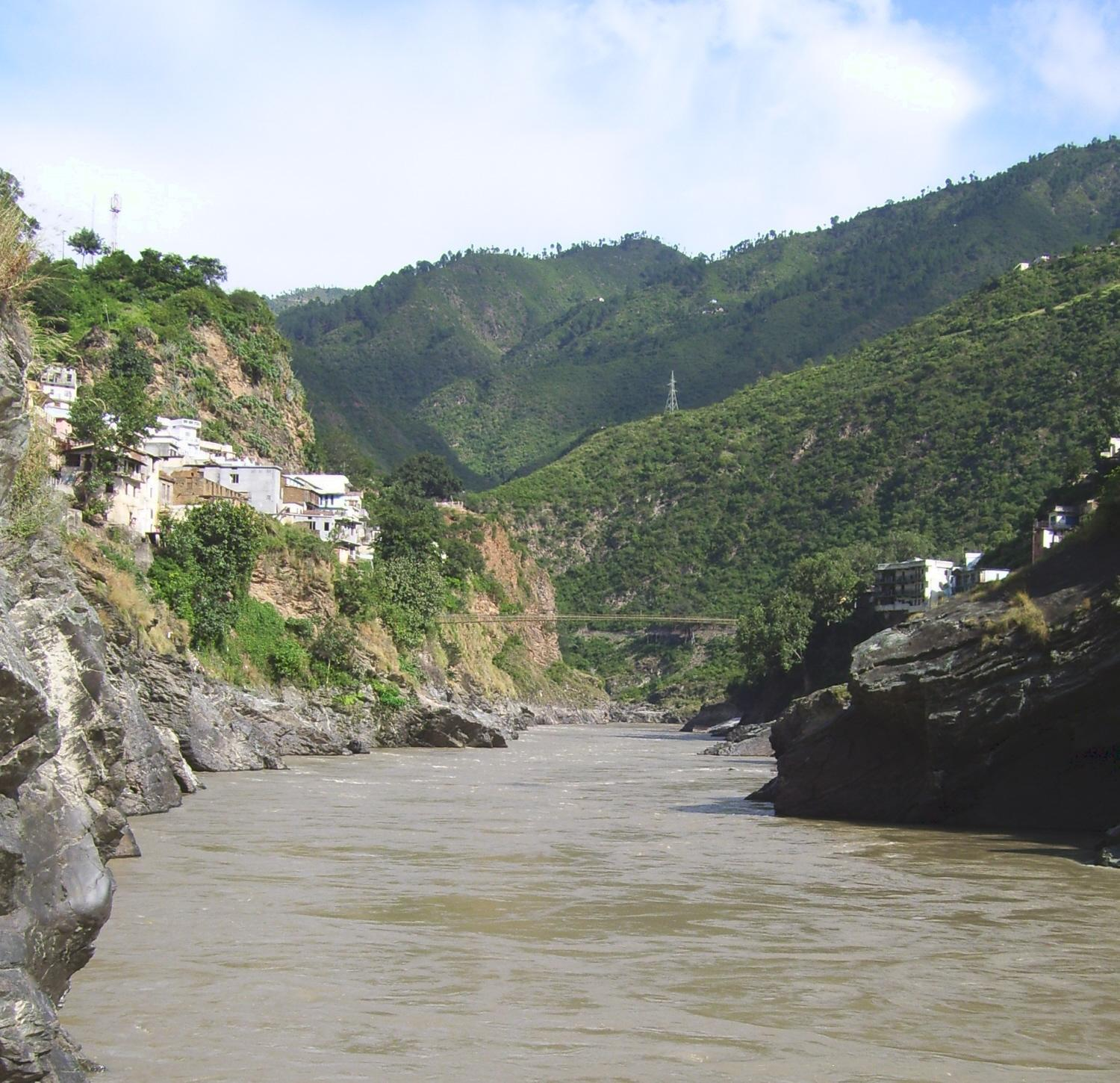
The sediment-laden Alaknanda river flowing into Devprayag.

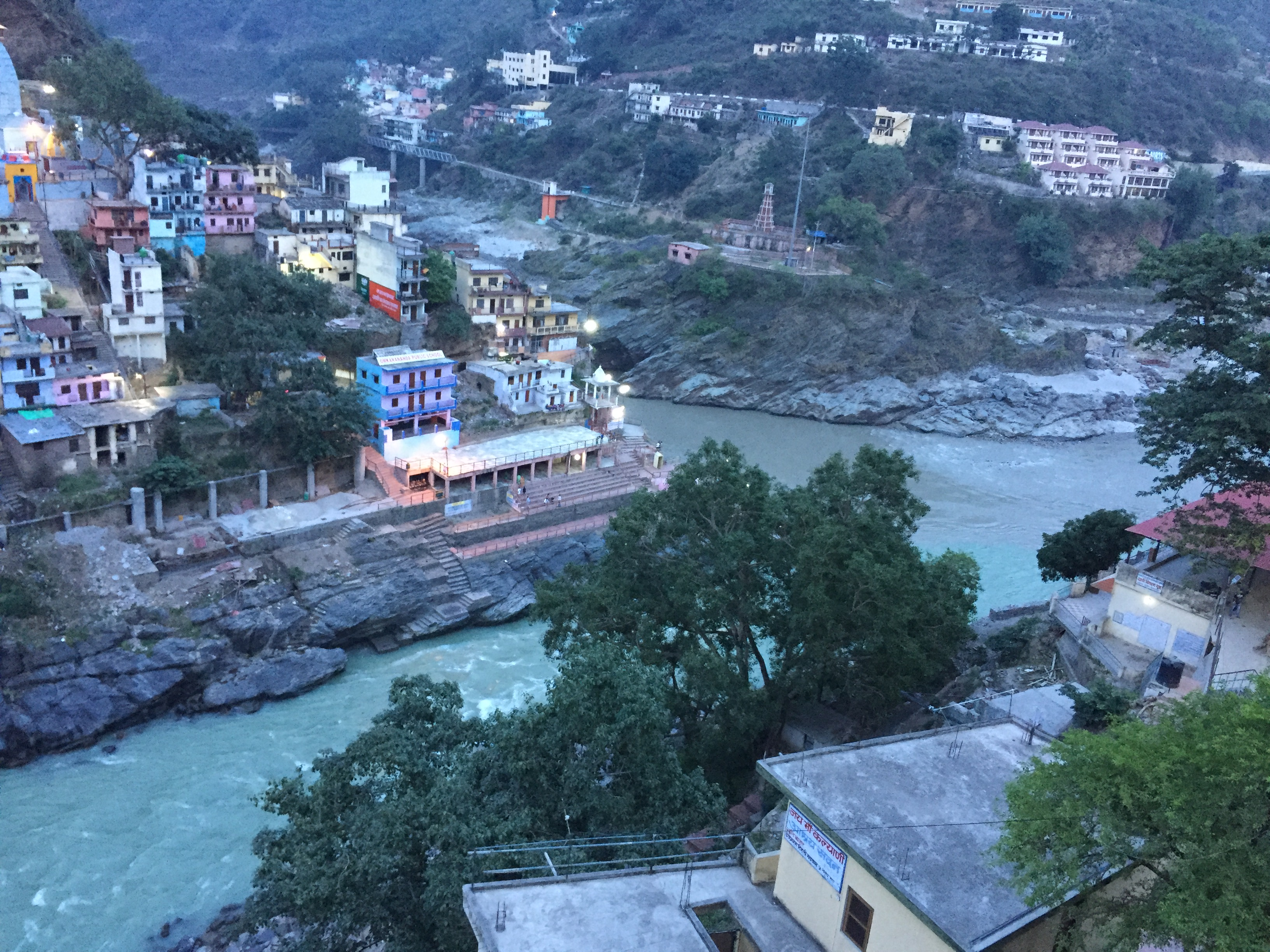
Devprayag - where Alaknanda and Bhagirathi rivers meet and take the name Ganga or Ganges River.

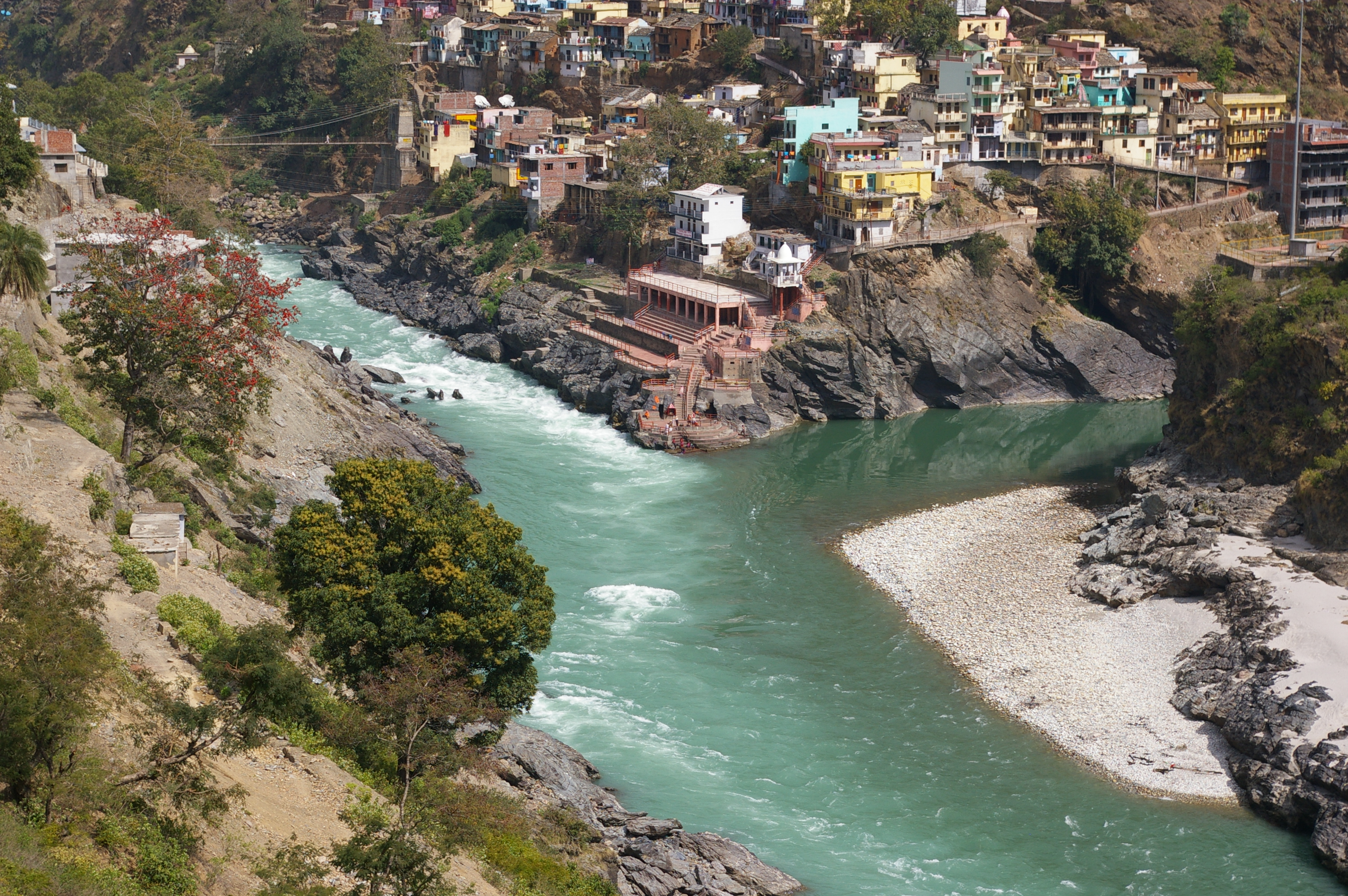
Devprayag the confluence of Bhagirathi and Alaknanda rivers. The river gets the name "Ganges" (or Ganga) beyond Devprayag

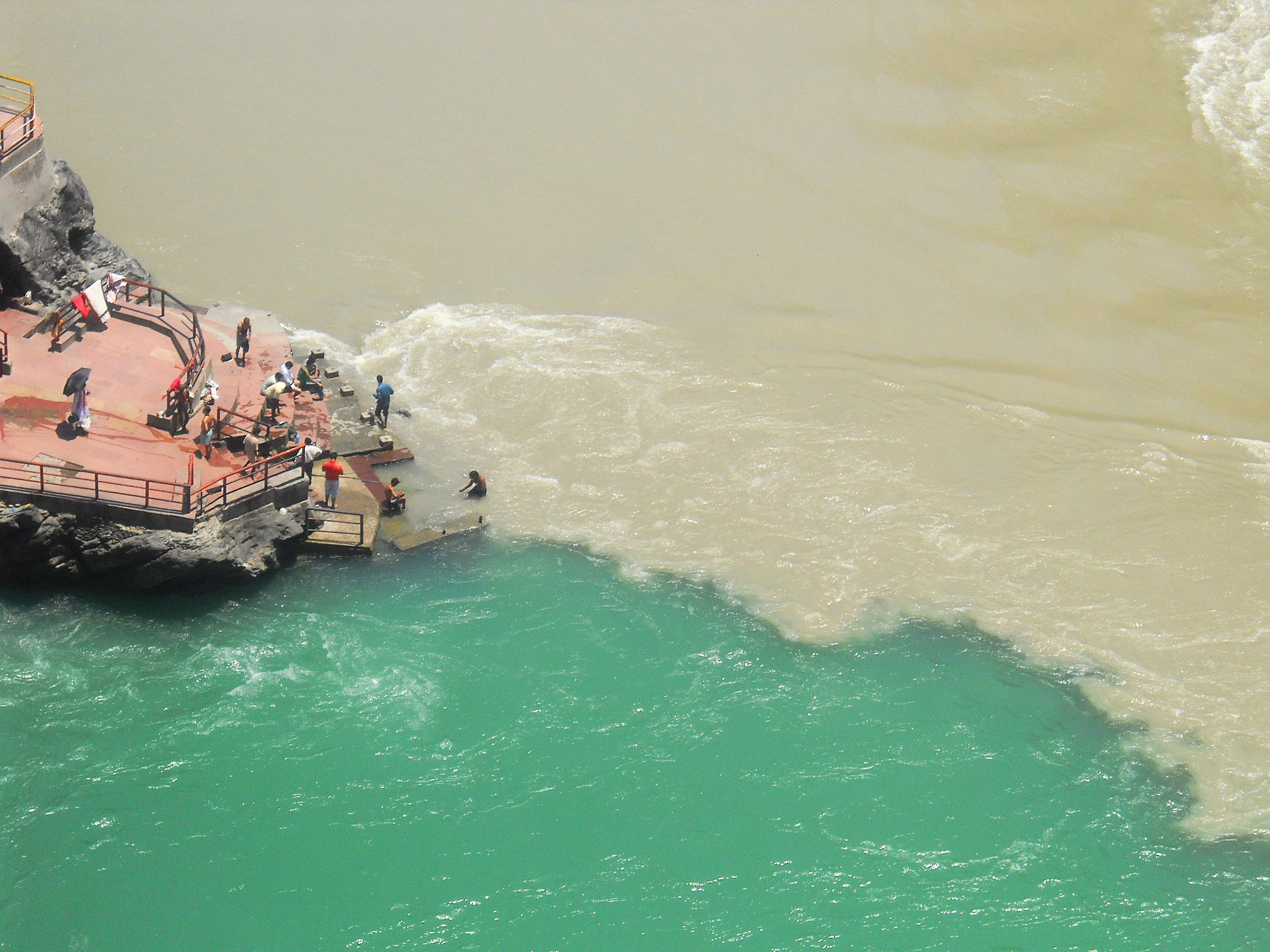
Alaknanda and Bhagirathi sangam at Devprayag. Now the river is known as Ganga

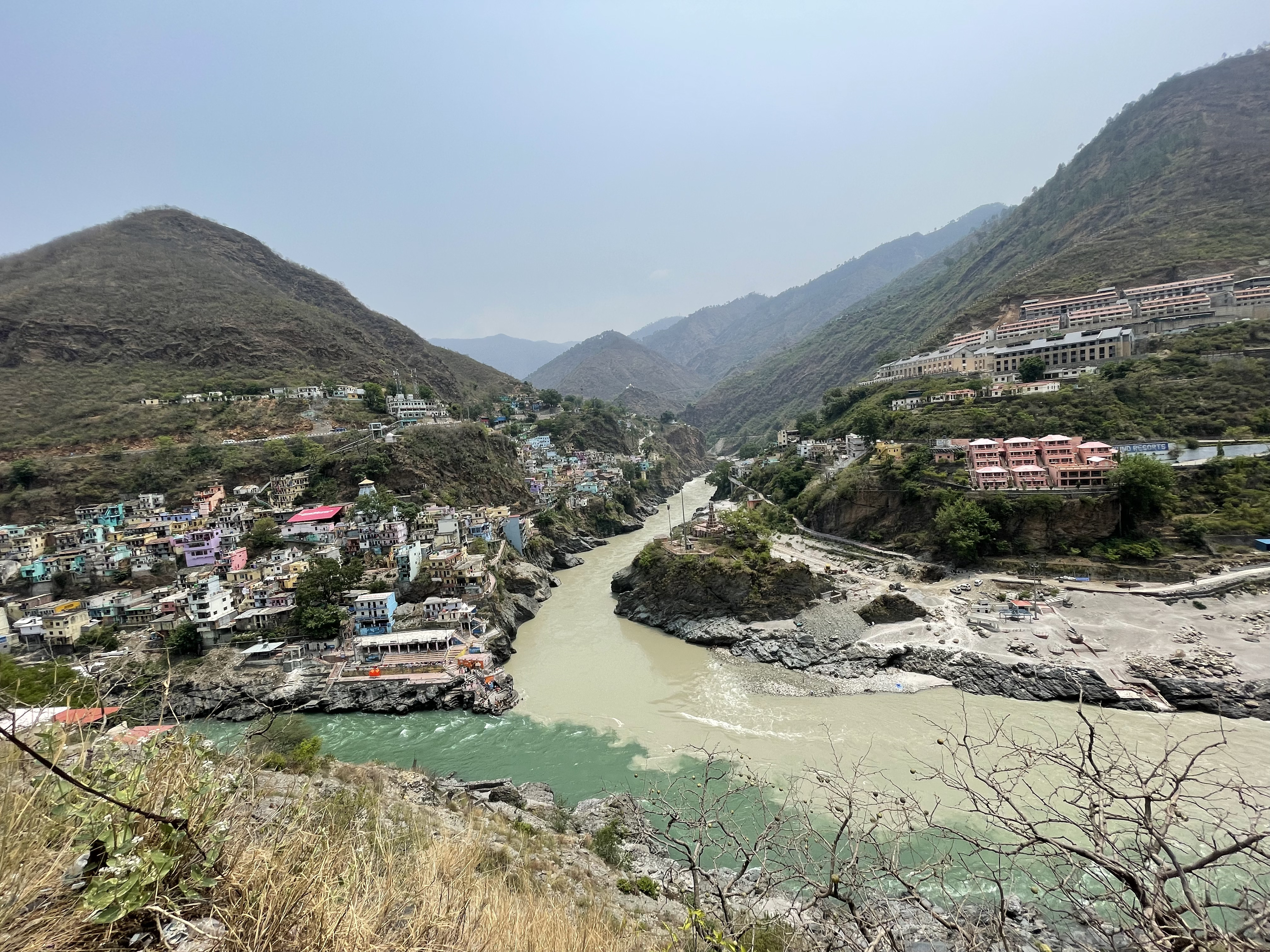
Devprayag sangam

== See also ==
- Rudraprayag
- Ganges River (Also known as Ganga in India)
