= Rudraprayag =

- City
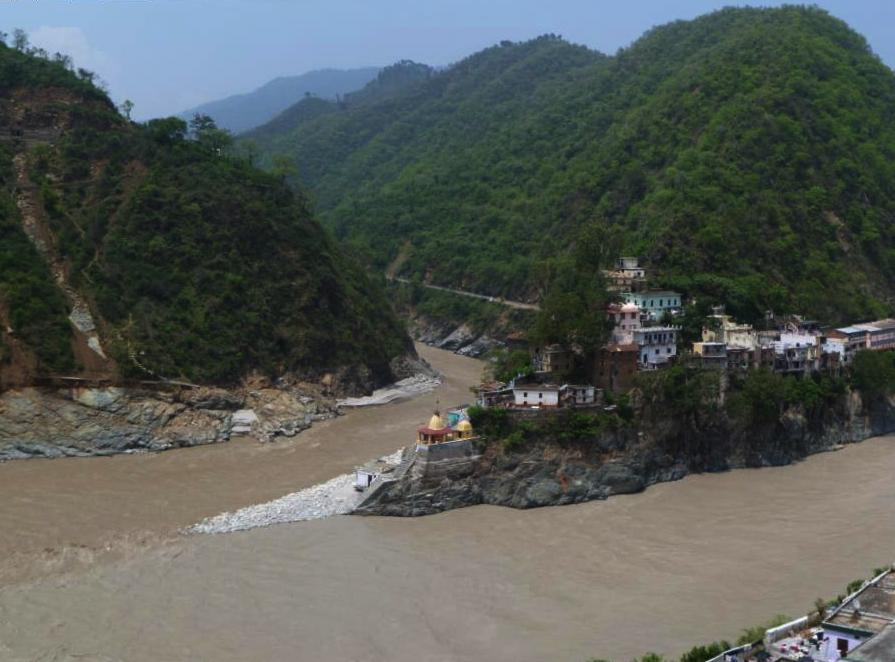
- Confluence of Alaknanda and Mandakini River at Rudraprayag
- Nickname: RPG
- Location in Uttarakhand, India Rudraprayag (India)
- Coordinates: 30.28°N 78.98°E
- Country: India
- State: Uttarakhand
- District: Rudraprayag
- Elevation: 690 m (2,260 ft)

Population (2011)
  - Total: 9,313

Languages
  - Official: Hindi
- Time zone: UTC+5:30 (IST)
- PIN: 246171
- Vehicle registration: UK-13
- Website: rudraprayag.nic.in

Rudraprayag is a city and a municipality in Rudraprayag district in the Indian state of Uttarakhand. Rudraprayag is one of the Panch Prayag (five confluences) of Alaknanda River, the point of confluence of rivers Alaknanda and Mandakini. Kedarnath, a Hindu holy city, is located 86 km from Rudraprayag. The man-eating leopard of Rudraprayag hunted and written about by Jim Corbett lived here.

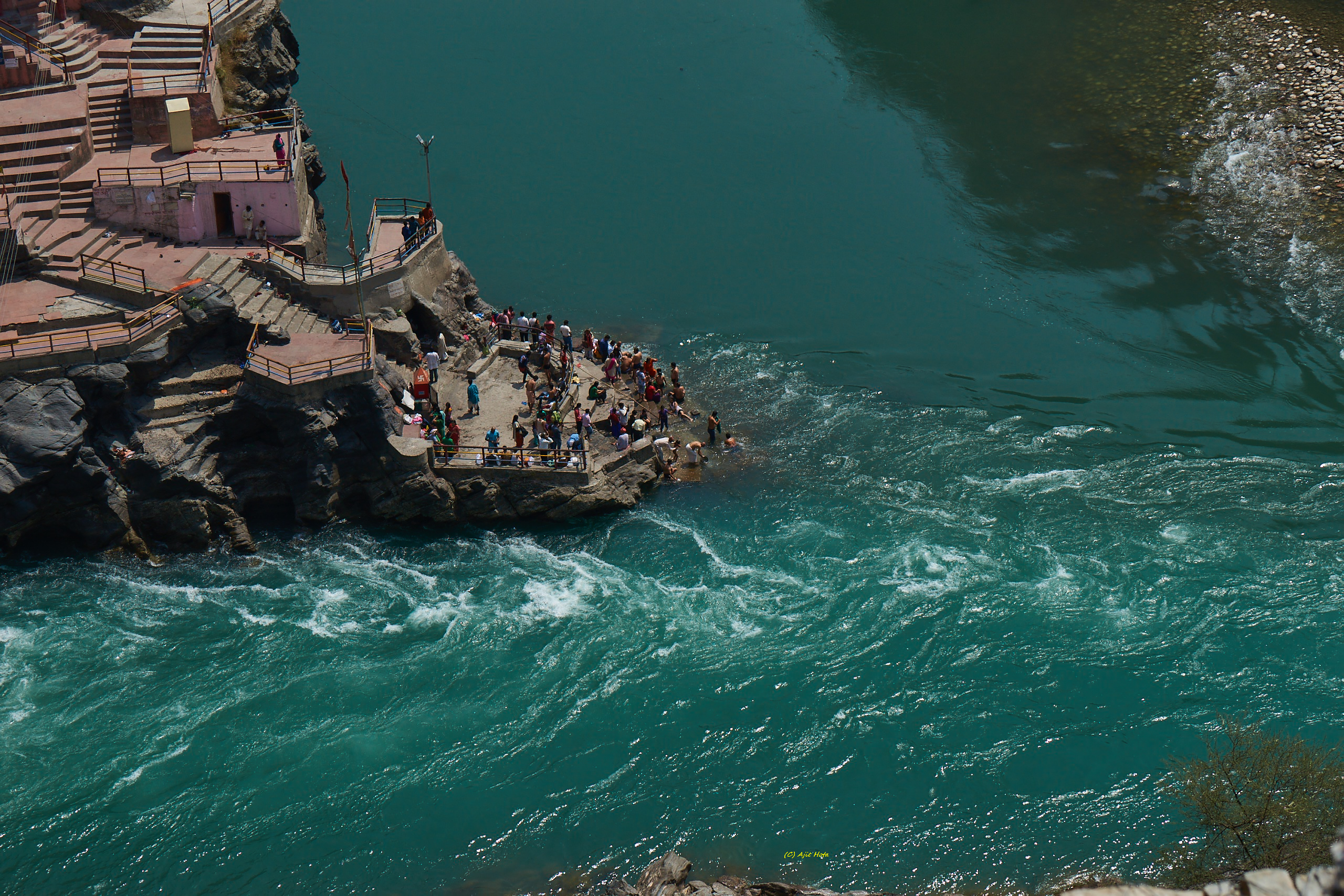
Devprayag Ganga's birthplace - Confluence of Alaknanda & Bhagirathi

== Geography ==
Rudraprayag district is located at 30.28°N 78.98°E. It has an average elevation of 895 metres (2,936 feet).

Many of the newer buildings and particularly the Sangam (confluence) area was severely damaged in the 2013 Uttarakhand floods. A footbridge over the Mandakini river and a road bridge 6 km downstream at Raitoli was washed away. The layout of the Sangam has altered significantly. The road along the Mandakini valley, leading to Kedarnath, was damaged at many points.

== Demographics ==
According to the 2011 census, the population of Rudraprayag is 9,313, of which 5,240 are males while 4,073 are females. female sex ratio of Rudraprayag is 777 against a state average of 963. Moreover, the child sex ratio in Rudraprayag is around 803 compared to the Uttarakhand state average of 890. The literacy rate of Rudraprayag city is 89.42%, higher than the state average of 78.82%. In Rudraprayag, male literacy is around 93.43%, while the female literacy rate is 84.24%.

Hinduism is practised by 95.16% of the total population and is the major religion of Rudraprayag. Islam is practiced by 4.37% of people and is the largest minority religion. Christianity is practised by 0.29%, Sikhism by 0.02%, and Buddhism by 0.01% of the people. The majority of the people in Rudraprayag speak Garhwali.

== How to reach ==
=== Air ===
The nearest airport is the Dehradun Airport near Dehradun, located 183 km (114 mi) away.

=== Railway ===
The nearest railway station is in Rishikesh. However, Rishikesh is a small railway station not connected by fast trains. Dehradun and Haridwar railway stations, 44 km and 24 km respectively farther from Rishikesh, has train connections to most of the major cities in India and therefore is the railhead for Rudraprayag.

=== Road ===
Rudraprayag lies on national highway NH58 that connects Delhi with Badrinath and Mana Pass in Uttarakhand near the Indo-Tibet border. Therefore, all buses and vehicles that carry pilgrims from New Delhi to Badrinath, via Haridwar and Rishikesh, in the pilgrimage season of summer months, pass through Rudraprayag on the way to Joshimath, and further north. Rishikesh is a starting point for road journeys to Rudraprayag, and regular buses operate from Rishikesh bus station to Rudraprayag. The road distance from Rishikesh to Rudraprayag is 141 km (88 mi) via Devprayag and Srinagar.

- Haridwar to Rishikesh (24 km)
- Rishikesh to Devprayag (74 km)
- Devprayag to Srinagar (34 km)
- Srinagar to Rudraprayag (33 km)

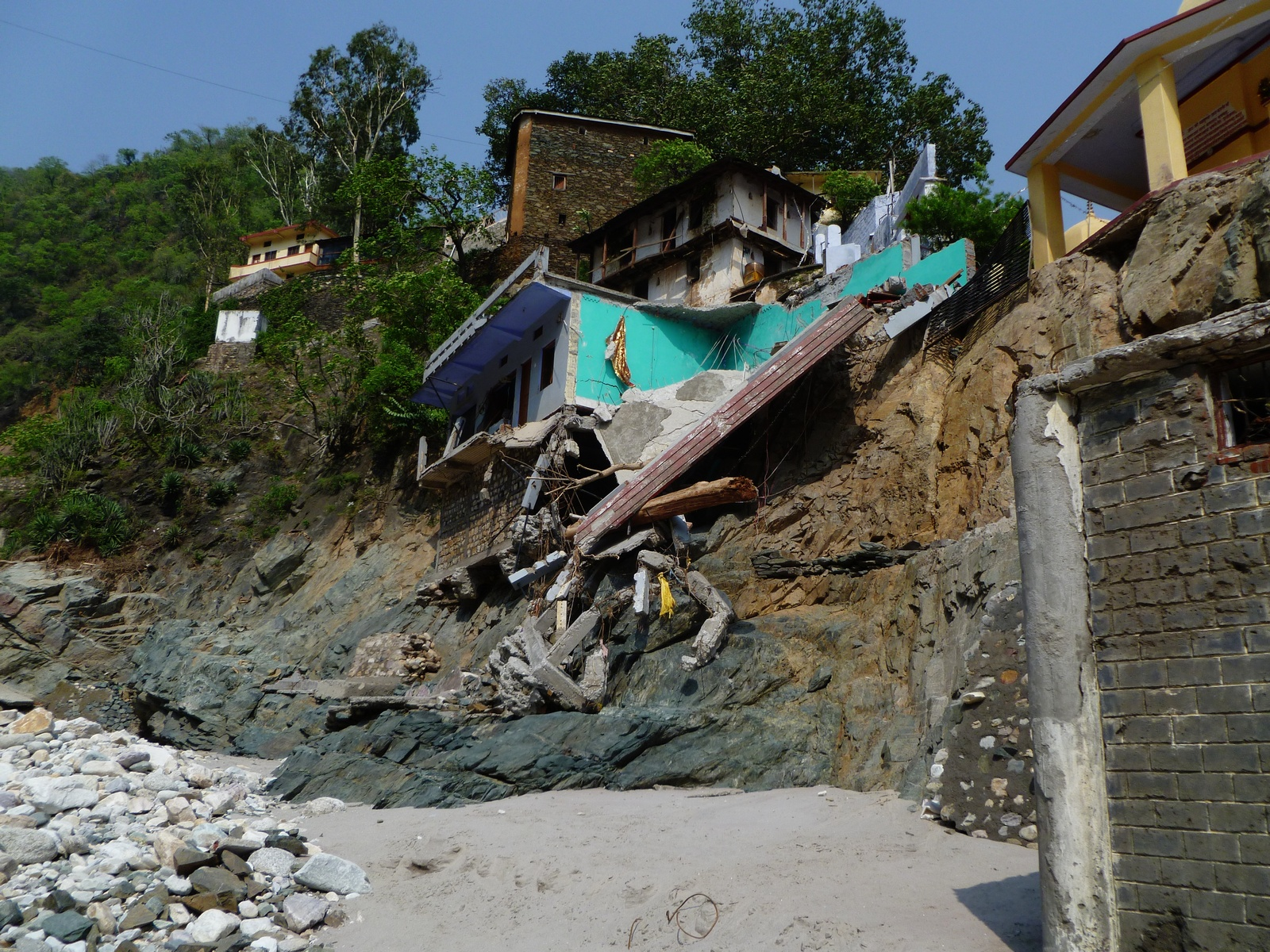
End of footbridge over the Mandakini river that was washed away on June 17, 2013.

== Notable places nearby ==
Rudranath Temple: Rudraprayag is named after Shiva, and the temple of Rudranath is situated at the confluence of the Alaknanda and Mandakini rivers. According to mythology Narada Muni worshiped god Shiva here to learn music from him. The god then taught him music in his form of Rudra, the god of music. There used to be a rock called Narad Shila, where Narada is said to have sat in meditation.

Dhari Devi Mandir: situated at Kalyasaur in between Srinagar and Rudraprayag. Distance between Srinagar-Dhari Devi and Dhari Devi-Rudraprayag is 16 km and 20 km, respectively.

Chamunda Devi Temple: the temple is also situated at the confluence of the holy rivers (Alaknanda & Mandakini). Chamunda, the wife of Rudra, is worshiped here.

Koteshwar: a temple of Shiva made by natural caves.

Tungeshwar Mahadev Ji, Phalasi: this temple has been here for centuries. Folklore has it that the Pandavas came here for penance. On the way from Chopta, there are many small temples up to the Tunganath Temple. On the temple walls, are terracotta style seals and Shiva-Parvati figurines.

Kartik Swami Temple: this temple is dedicated to Kartikeya, son of Shiva. It can be reached by a 3 km trek from Kanak Chauri village, which is located on the Rudraprayag-Pokhri route, 38 km from Rudraprayag. Visitors can see the snow-clad Himalayan range from the Kartik Swami temple.

Basukedar: this village is where Shiva reputedly lived, before coming to Kedarnath. It's a Shiva temple constructed by Pandavas. The architecture and idols seem to be at least 1000 yrs old. It is a good place for meditation and dhyana yoga. It is around 35 km from Agustmuni. around 1.30 hr by drive. This is actually an old track to visit Kedarnath. It is said that Shiva stayed a night in Basukedar while he was travelling to Kedarnath; this is the reason this place is called Basukedar.

Kedarnath Temple: one of the twelve Jyotirlingas of Shiva, is situated in the Himalayan. It is believed that the Kedarnath temple was built by the Pandavas in ancient times. Later, King Bhoj of Malwa also did some work related to temple construction. Most people believe that the present form of the temple was built by Adi Shankaracharya in the 8th century. The temple doors are closed for 6 months during the winter period, during this time the unbroken holdings in the temple keep on burning for 6 months.

== Photo gallery ==
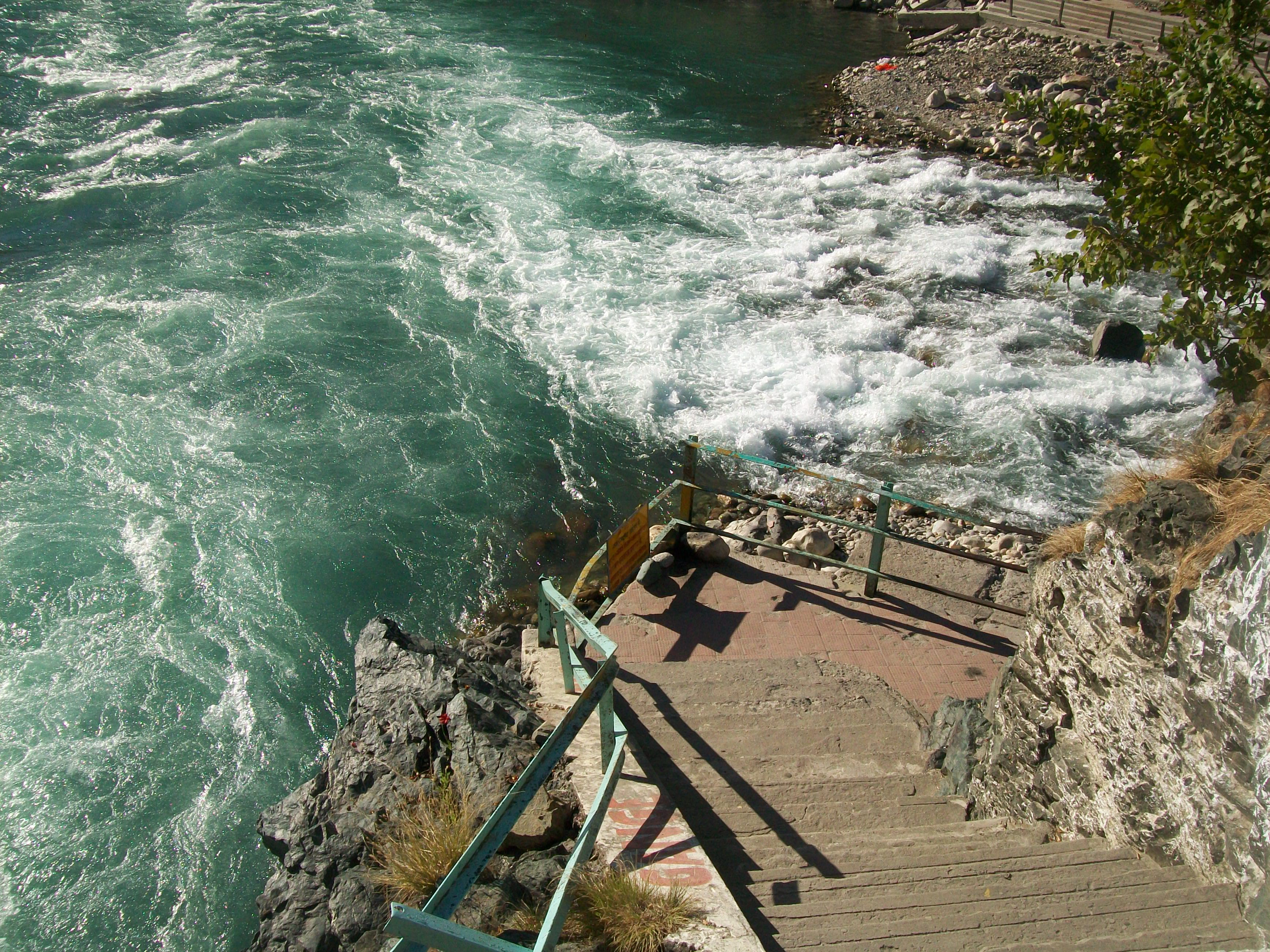
Confluence of the Alaknanda, left, and the Mandakini river, right, at Rudraprayag

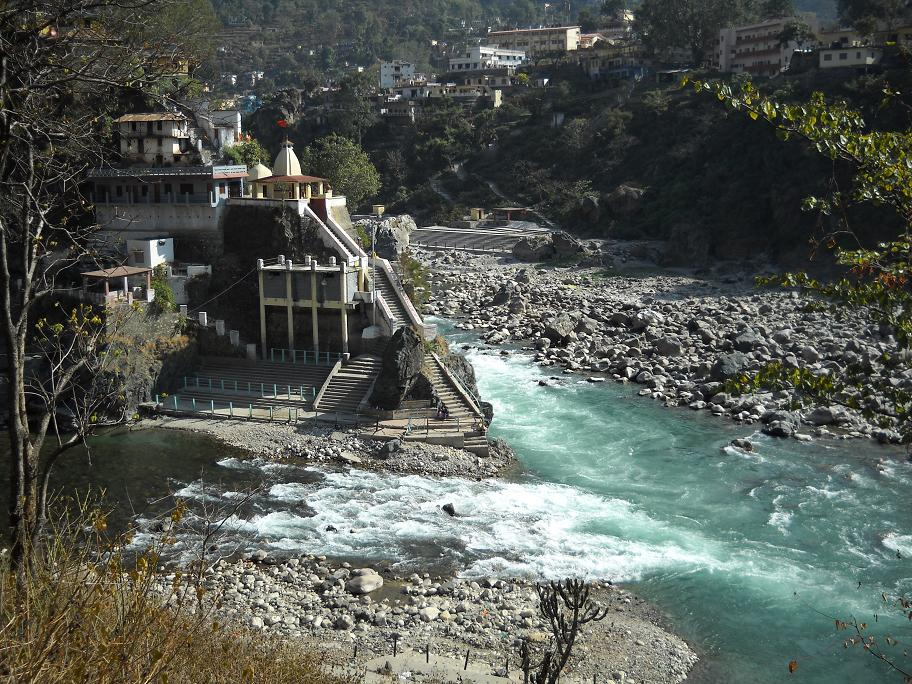
Confluence of Alaknanda (background) and Mandakini (foreground) at Rudraprayag. In the 2013 Uttarakhand floods, after the Mandakini ravaged its banks, all the structures below the Chamundi temple have been seriously damaged and the large boulder called Narad Shila has disappeared while a long line of stones have appeared along the confluence.

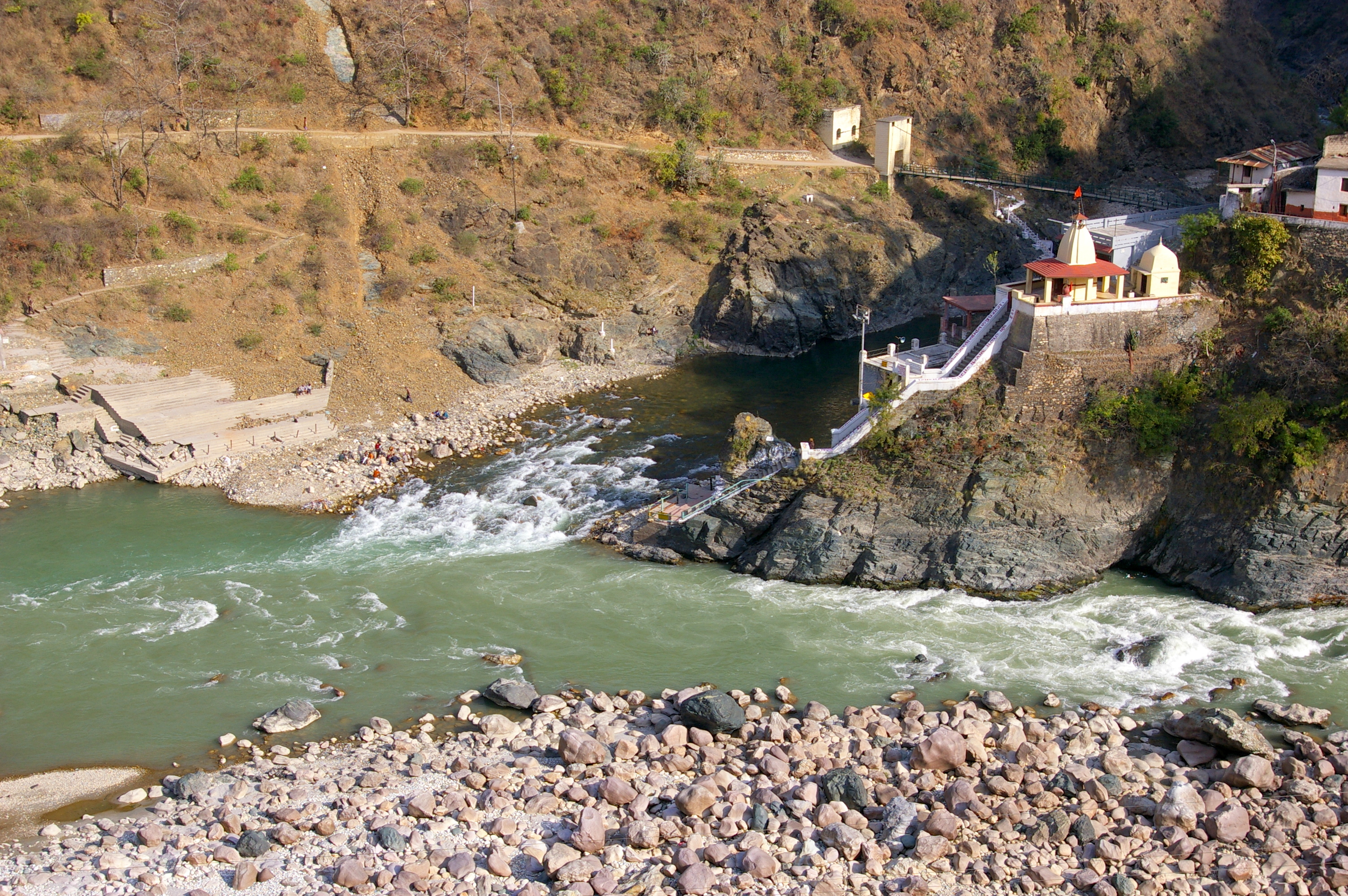
Rudraprayag - Confluence of Alaknanda and Mandakini

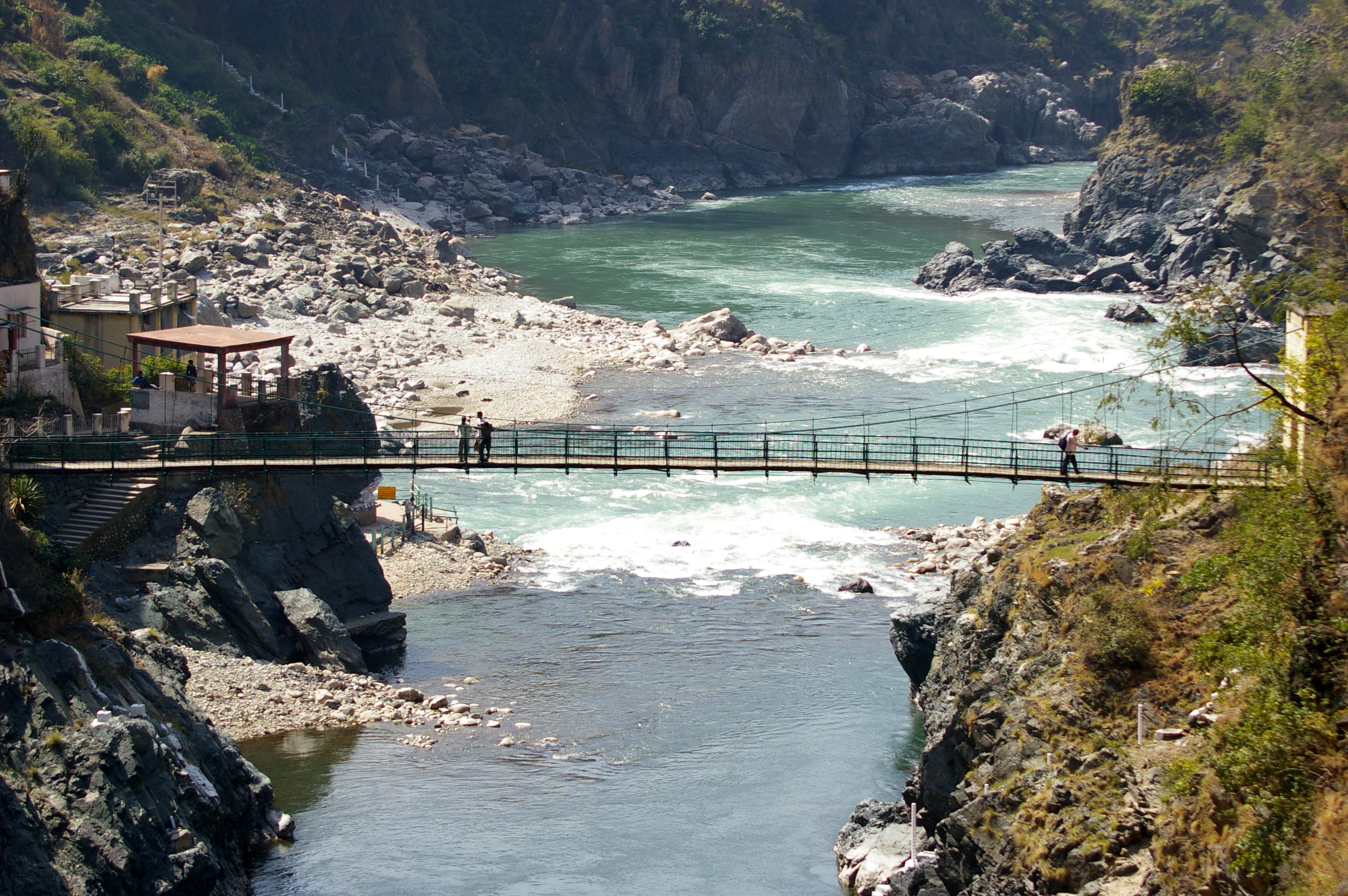
Mandakini coming in to join Alaknanda. The jhula bridge seen here and the previous image was washed away along with the pillar on the other bankduring the 2013 Uttarakhand floods.

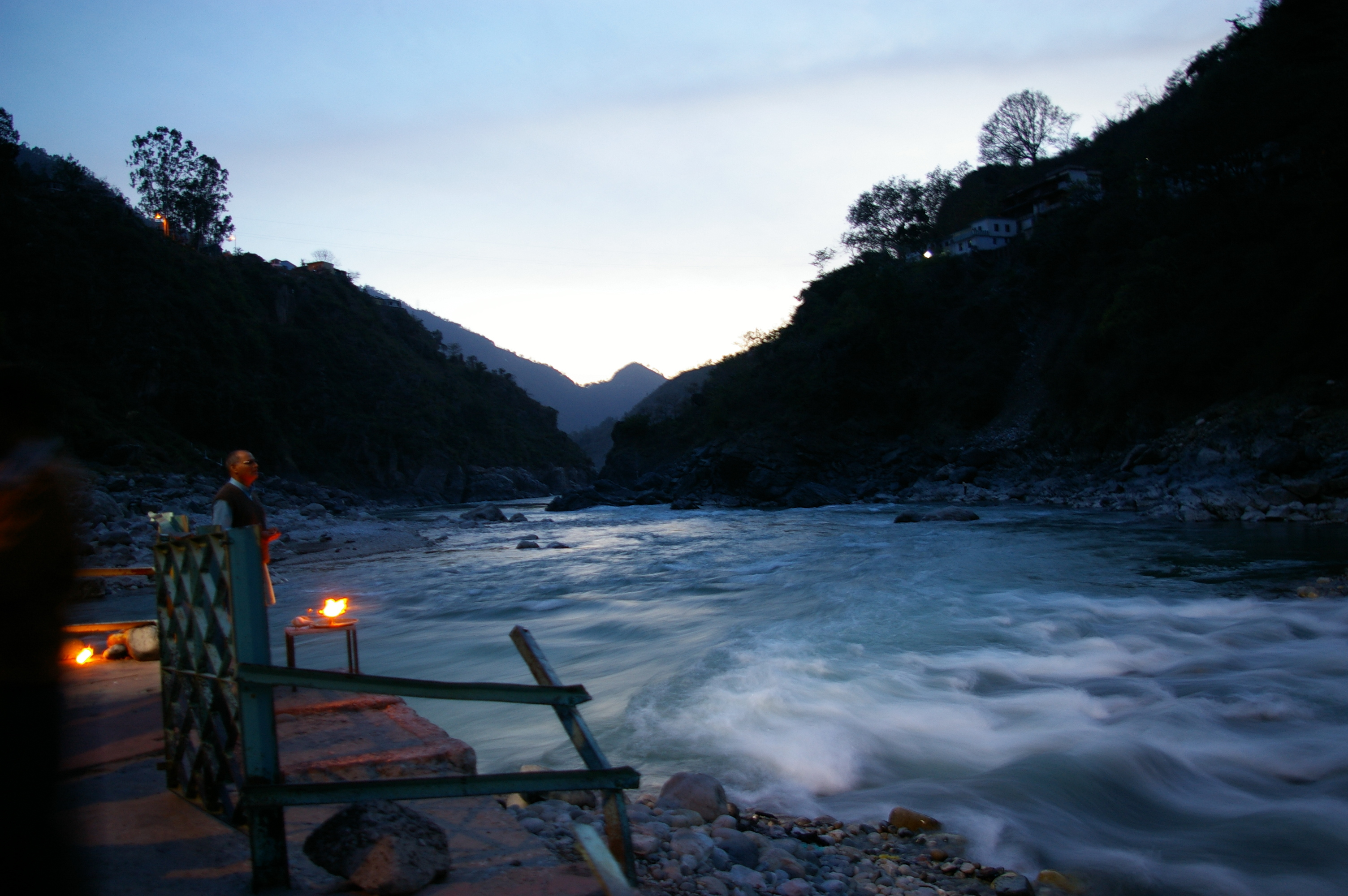
Evening prayers "Sandhya Aarti" at Rudraprayag

== See also ==
- Leopard of Rudraprayag
