= Alaknanda River =

River in India

Alakanandā
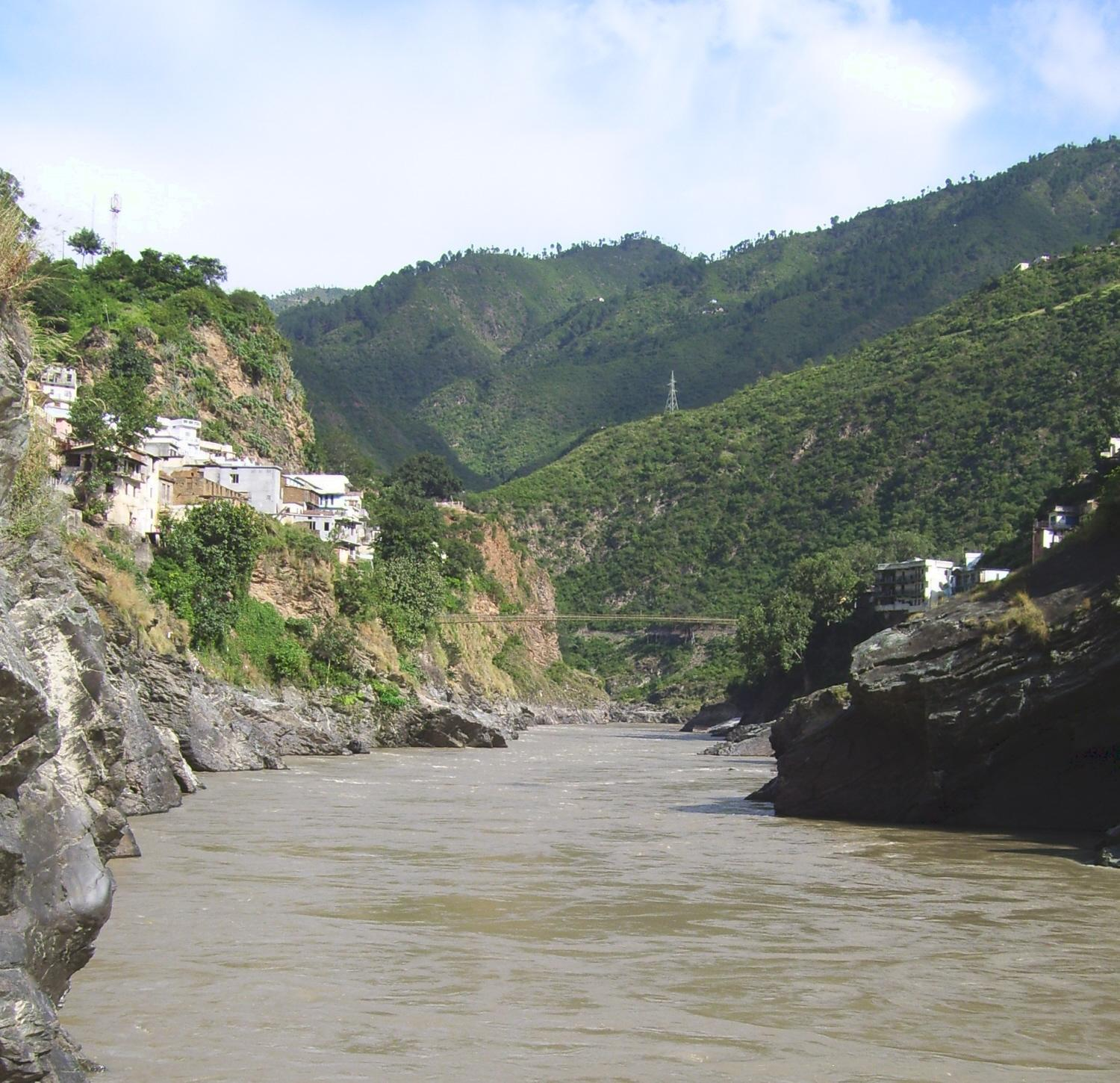
- The sediment-laden Alaknanda river flowing into Devprayag, Uttarakhand.

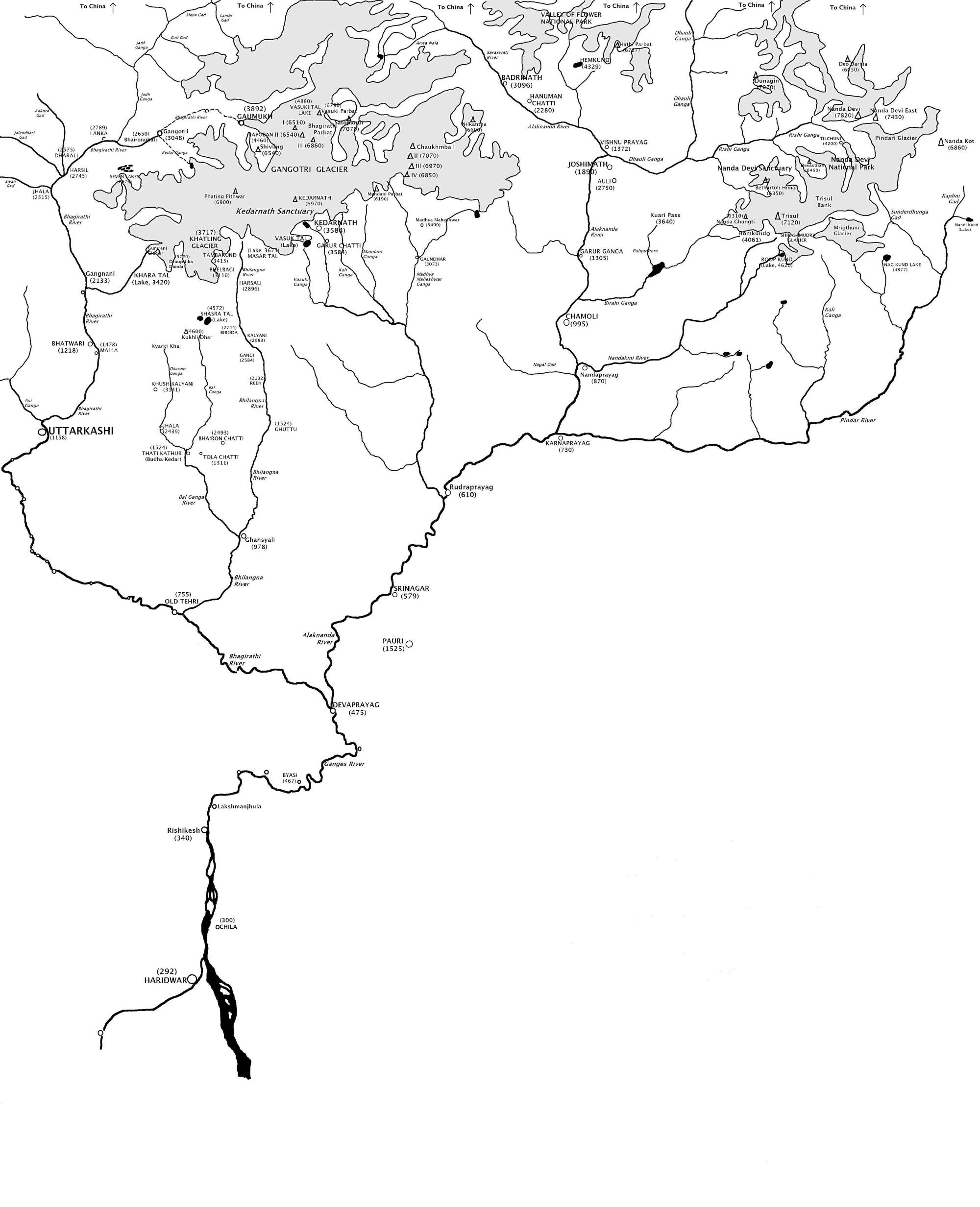
- The Himalayan headwaters of the Ganges river in the Garhwal region of Uttarakhand, India. The Alaknanda is the left bank tributary of the Ganges at Devprayag.

Location
- Country: India
- State: Uttarakhand
- Region: Garhwal division
- District: Chamoli, Rudraprayag, Pauri Garhwal

Physical characteristics
- Source: Confluence of Satopanth Glacier and Bhagirathi Kharak Glacier
  - location: Uttarakhand
  - coordinates: 30°47′03″N 79°26′19″E
  - elevation: 3,880 m (12,730 ft)
- Mouth: Ganges
  - location: Devprayag, Uttarakhand, India
  - coordinates: 30°08′43″N 78°35′52″E
  - elevation: 475 m (1,558 ft)
- Length: 195 km (121 mi)
- Basin size: 10,882 km^{2} (4,202 sq mi)
- Discharge
  - average: 439.36 m^{3}/s (15,516 cu ft/s)

Basin features
- Tributaries
  - left: Saraswati, Dhauliganga, Nandakini, Pindar
  - right: Mandakini

The Alaknanda is a Himalayan river in the Indian state of Uttarakhand and one of the two headstreams of the Ganges, the major river of Northern India and a river considered holy in Hinduism. In hydrology, the Alaknanda is considered the source stream of the Ganges on account of its greater length and discharge; while, in Hindu tradition and culture, the other headstream, the Bhagirathi, is considered the source stream.

== Course ==
The Alaknanda rises at the confluence and foot of the Satopanth and Bhagirath Kharak glaciers in Uttarakhand. From its origin, it travels to the village of Mana, meets with the Saraswati River, a left bank tributary at Keshav Prayag and continues downstream through narrow valleys. It reaches the Badrinath valley, arrives at Hanumanchatti, and meets with the Ghrit Ganga, a right bank tributary. From Hanumanchatti, the river goes to Pandukeshwar and flows through wide valleys and steep terrains.

At Vishnuprayag it meets Dhauliganga, a left bank tributary, and travels west to the town of Joshimath. From Joshimath, the Alaknanda crosses the Main Central Thrust near Helang. It then meets with Birahi Ganga, a left bank tributary at Birahi. The river reaches the town of Nandprayag and joins with the Nandakini River, a left bank tributary. At Karanprayag, the Pindar River, a left bank tributary, meets with the Alaknanda River. At Rudraprayag, it meets with the Mandakini River, a right bank tributary. As the Alaknanda flows past Rudraprayag, it enters a wide valley near Srinagar, Garhwal. At Devprayag the Alaknanda River converges with the Bhagirathi River and travels onward as the Ganges River.

The Alaknanda contributes a significantly larger portion to the flow of the Ganges than the Bhagirathi. The Alaknanda system drains parts of Chamoli, Tehri, and Pauri districts.

== Religious significance ==
In ancient Hindu texts, the Alaknanda river has been used synonymously with the Ganges river. In the Vishnu Purana, the Ganges river which surrounds the city of Brahma divides into four and one of rivers is called Alaknanda, which flows south to India.

Five rivers merge with the Alaknanda and are referred to as prayag or 'holy confluence of rivers' and are places of pilgrimage in Hinduism. Panch Prayag (Pañcha prayāga) is an expression in Hindu religious ethos, specifically used to connote the five sacred river confluences in the Garhwal Himalayas in the state of Uttarakhand, India. The five prayags - prayaga meaning "place of confluence of rivers" in Sanskrit - also termed as "Prayag pentad". These in the descending flow sequence of their occurrence include Vishnuprayag, where the Alaknanda meets the Dhauliganga River, Nandaprayag, where it meets the Nandakini River, Karnaprayag, where it meets the Pindar River, Rudraprayag, where it meets the Mandakini River, and Devprayag, where it meets the Bhagirathi River and officially becomes the Ganges.

Alaknanda + Dhauliganga = Vishnu Prayag

Alaknanda + Nandakini = Nand Prayag

Alaknanda + Pindarganga = Karna Prayag

Alaknanda + Mandakini = Rudra Prayag

Alaknanda + Bhagirathi = Dev Prayag

The Alaknanda also flows through other important places of pilgrimage such as Badrinath and Joshimath.

== Recreation ==
The Alaknanda river is known for river rafting due to its high rafting grade.

== Dams ==
There are 37 hydroelectric dams in operation, under construction or planned to harness the energy of the Alaknanda river and its tributaries and generate electricity.

| # | Name | Electrical output capacity (MW) | Status | Dam height (m) | Full reservoir level (MSL) (m) | River bed level at dam site (MSL) (m) | Head race tunnel length (km) | Tail race tunnel length (m) | Tail water level (MSL) (m) |
|---|---|---|---|---|---|---|---|---|---|
| 1 | Badrinath | 1.25 | operational | | | | | | |
| 2 | Tapovan | 0.8 | operational | | | | | | |
| 3 | Tharali | 0.4 | operational | | | | | | |
| 4 | Tilwara | 0.2 | operational | | | | | | |
| 5 | Urgam | 3 | operational | | | | | | |
| 6 | Vishnuprayag | 400 | operational | 14 | | | 11.323 | | |
| 7 | Kaliganga-I | 4 | under construction | | | | | | |
| 8 | Kaliganga-II | 6 | under construction | | | | | | |
| 9 | Koti Bhel IB | 320 | under construction | 90 | 521 | 452.5 | | 230 | 463.2 |
| 10 | Koti Bhel II | 530 | under construction | 82 | 458.5 | 401.4 | | 390 | 411.1 |
| 11 | Madhamaheshwar | 10 | under construction | | | | | | |
| 12 | Tapovan Vishnugad | 520 | under construction | 22 | 803.5 | | | 513 | 1267 |
| 13 | Srinagar | 330 | operational | | | | | | |
| 14 | Singoli Bhatwari | 99 | under construction | | | | | | |

There are 23 other proposed projects in the Alaknanda river basin through which the power-potential of the Alaknanda and its tributaries can be harnessed. The proposed 23 hydel-projects are as follows -

1. Alaknanda (Badrinath) (300 MW)
2. Bagoli (72 MW)
3. Bowla Nandprayag (132 MW)
4. Chuni Semi (60 MW)
5. Deodi (60 MW)
6. Devsari Dam (255 MW)
7. Gaurikund (18.6 MW)
8. Gohana Tal (60 MW)
9. Jelam Tamak (60 MW)
10. Karnaprayag (160 MW)
11. Lakshmanganga (4.4 MW)
12. Lata Tapovan (310 MW)
13. Maleri Jelam (55 MW)
14. Nandprayag Langasu (141 MW)
15. Padli Dam (27 MW)
16. Phata-Byung (10.8 MW)
17. Rambara (24 MW)
18. Rishiganga I (70 MW)
19. Rishiganga II (35 MW)
20. Tamak Lata (280 MW)
21. Urgam II (3.8 MW)
22. Utyasu Dam (860 MW)
23. Vishnugad Pipalkoti (444 MW)

== Gallery ==
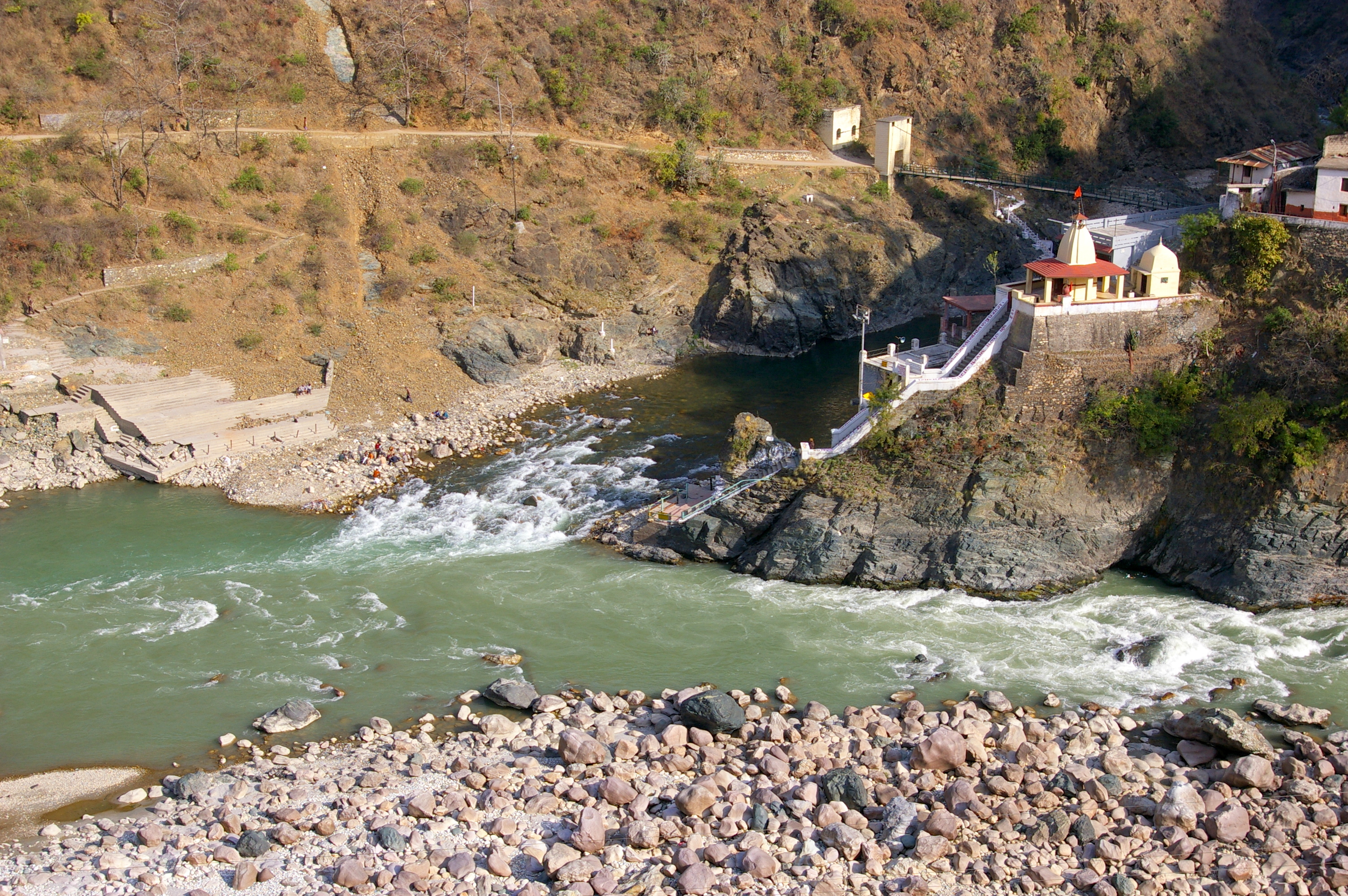
Rudraprayag - confluence of Alaknanda and Mandakini

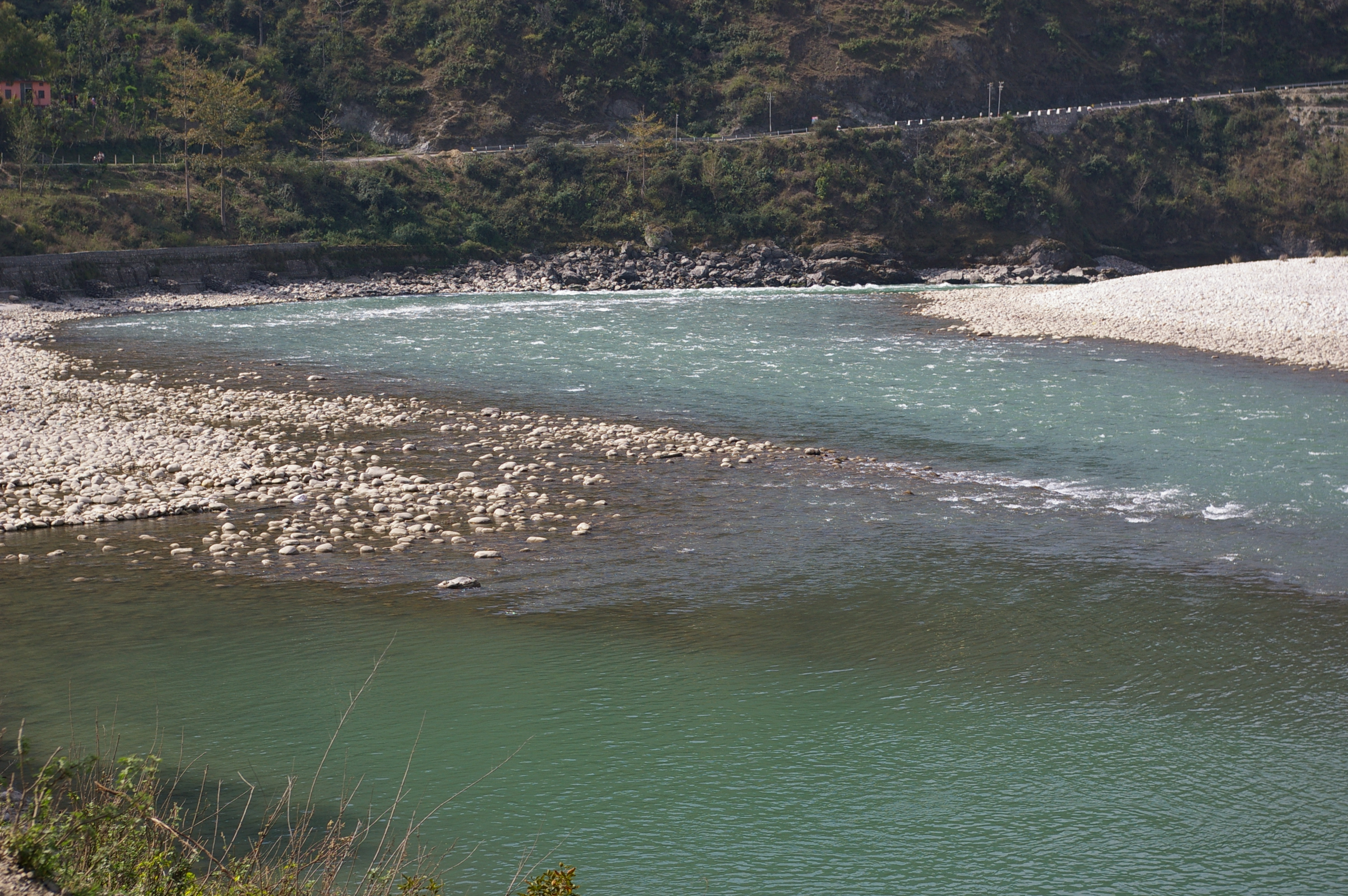
Alaknanda river near the town of Srinagar in Uttarakhand

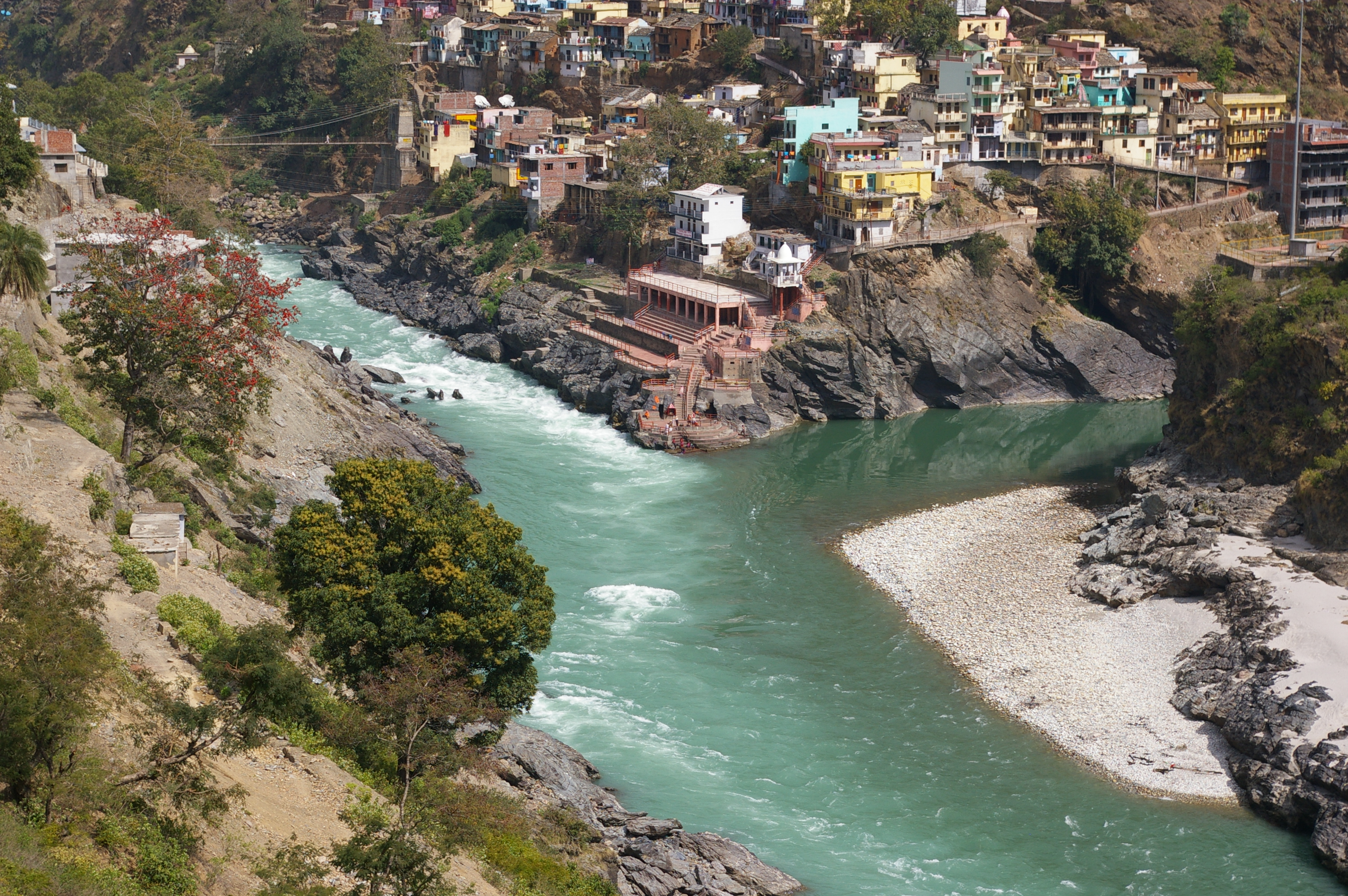
Alaknanda joins Bhagirathi at Devprayag to form the Ganges

== See also ==
- 2013 North India floods
- 2021 Uttarakhand flood
