= Nandaprayag =

- Town
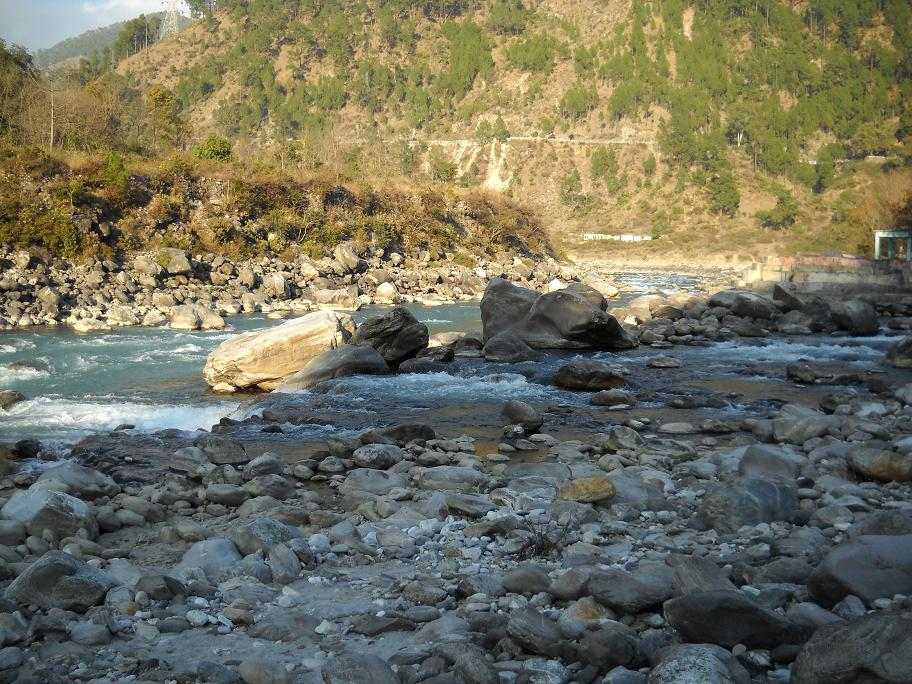
- The Nandakini River (foreground) meets the Alaknanda River (background) in Nandaprayag

- Location in Uttarakhand, India
- Coordinates: 30.33°N 79.33°E
- Country: India
- State: Uttarakhand
- District: Chamoli
- Elevation: 914 m (2,999 ft)

Population (2001)
  - Total: 1,433

Languages
  - Official: Hindi
- Time zone: UTC+5:30 (IST)
- PIN: 246449

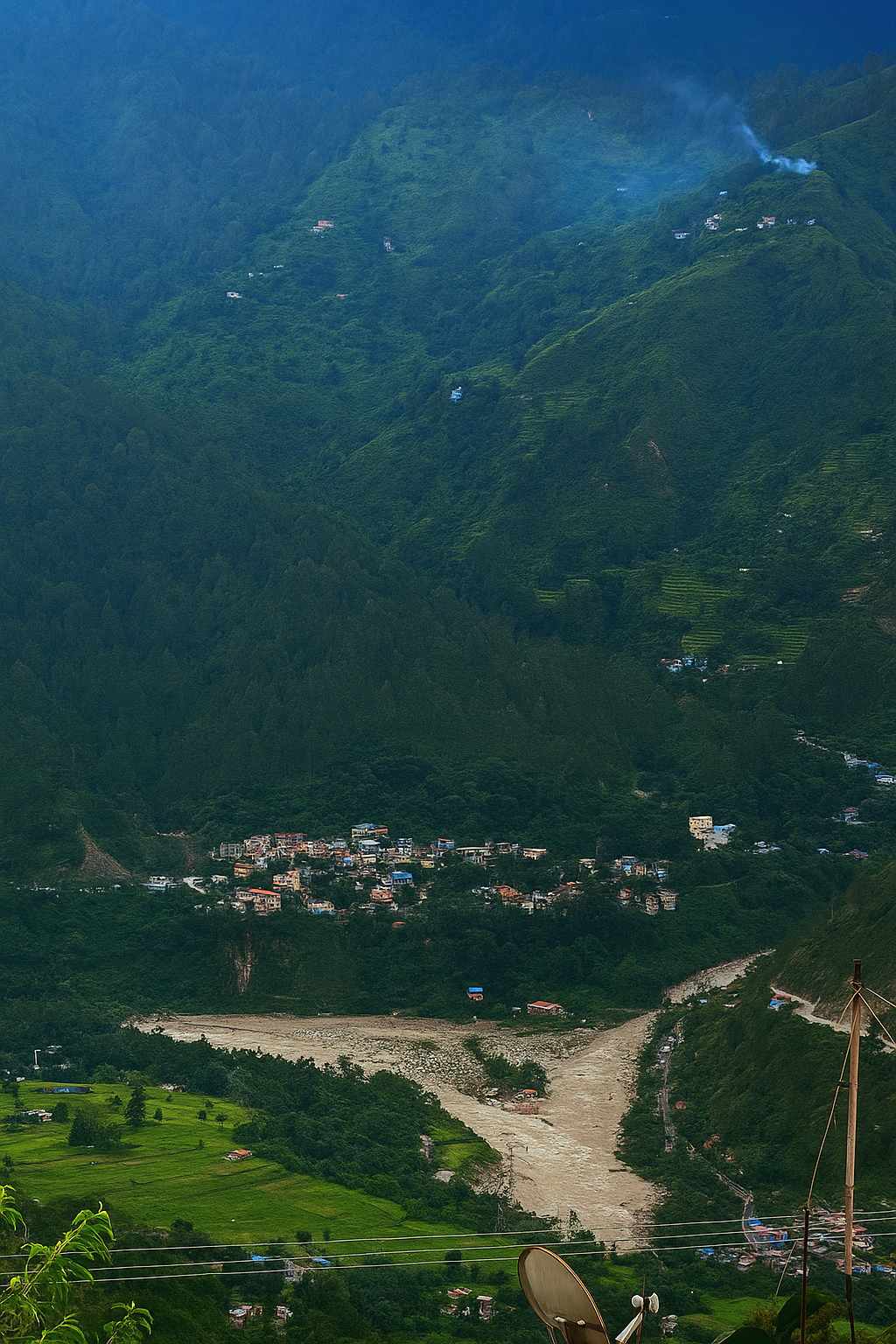
Nandprayag Sky View

Nandaprayag is a town and a nagar panchayat in Chamoli district in the Indian state of Uttarakhand. Nandaprayag is one of the Panch Prayag (five confluences) of Alaknanda River and lies at the confluence of the Alaknanda River and Nandakini River. Nandaprayag was once the capital of the Yadu kingdom.

== Geography ==
Nandaprayag is located at 30.33°N 79.33°E. It has an average elevation of 1,358 metres (4,455 feet).

== Demographics ==
As of 2001 India census, Nandaprayag had a population of 1433. Males constitute 56% of the population and females 44%. Nandaprayag has an average literacy rate of 70%, higher than the national average of 59.5%: male literacy is 78%, and female literacy is 61%. In Nandaprayag, 13% of the population is under 6 years of age.

== Gallery ==
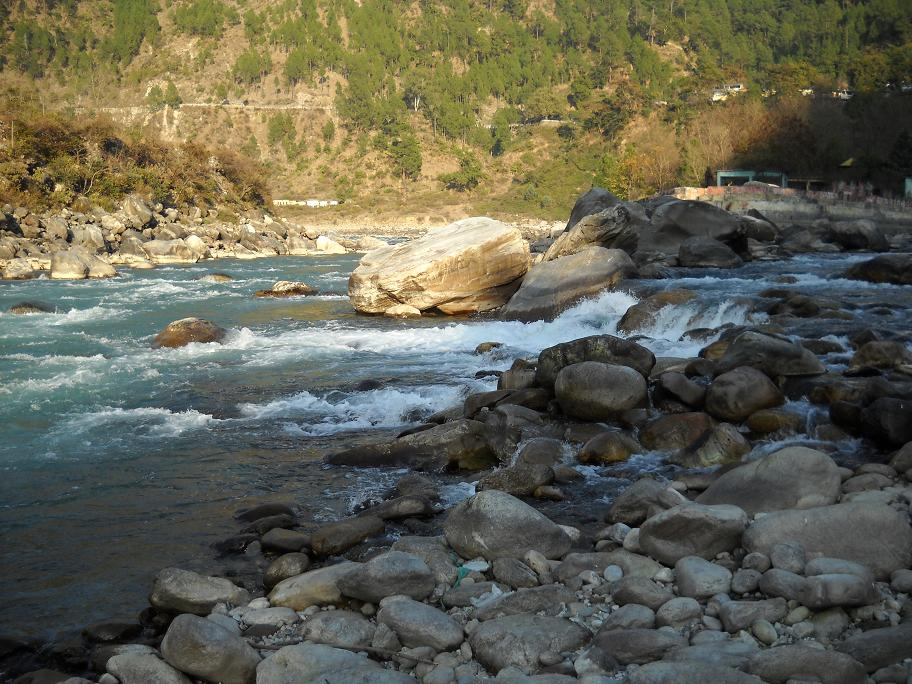
Another view of the confluence of the Nandakini River (foreground) and the Alaknanda River (background) at Nandprayag

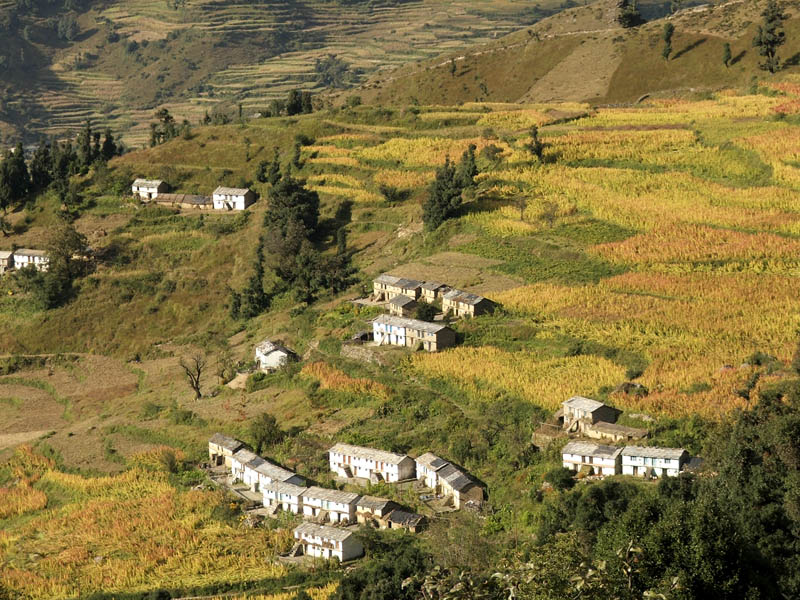
Bangali village near Nandprayag.
