= Kedarnath Temple =

Hindu temple in Rudraprayag, Uttarakhand, India

- Kedarnath Jyotirliṅga
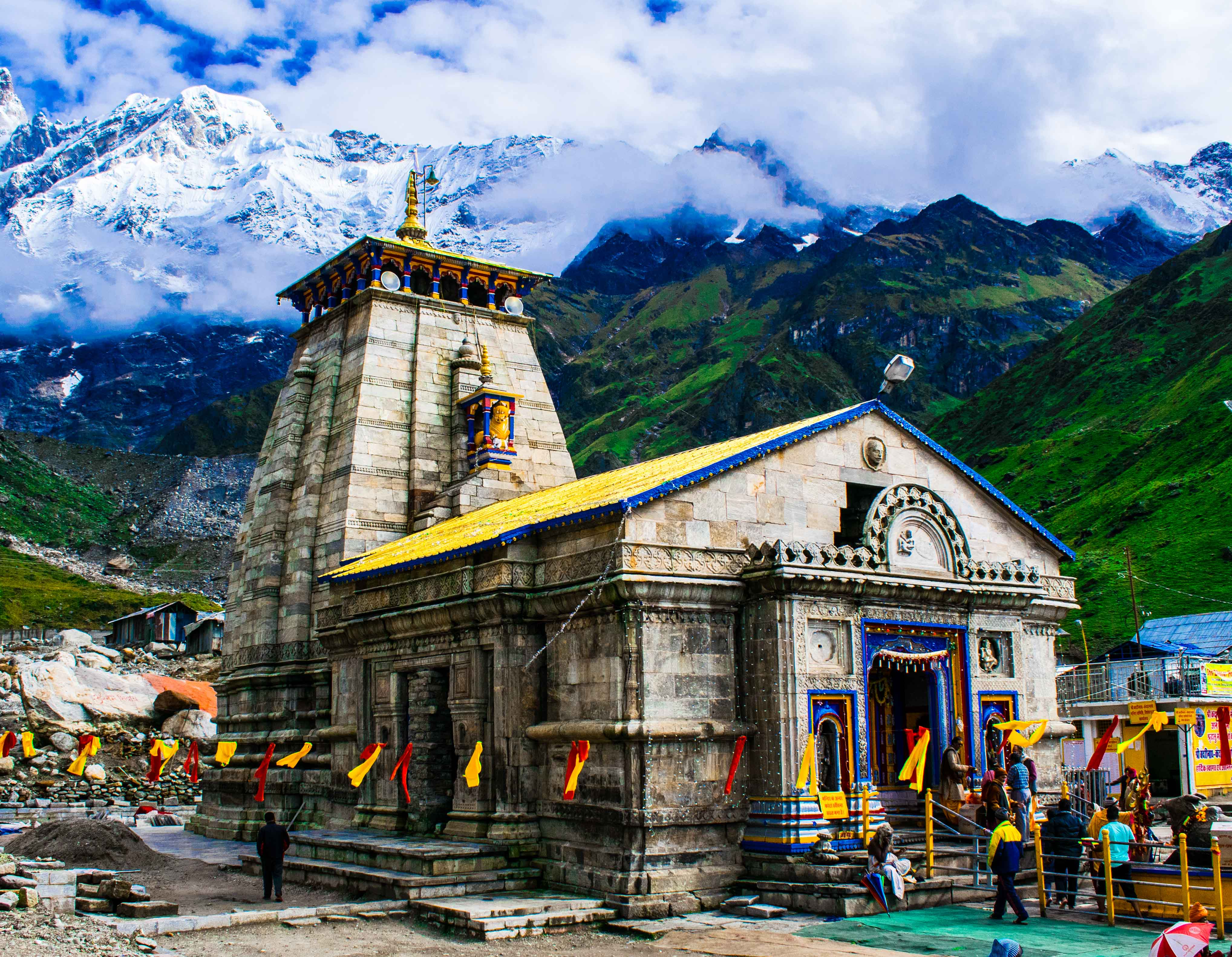
- Kedarnath Temple

- Location in Uttarakhand

Religion
- Affiliation: Hinduism
- District: Rudraprayag
- Deity: Śiva
- Festival: Maha Shivaratri
- Governing body: Śrī Badrinath Kedarnath Temple Committee

Location
- Location: Kedarnath
- State: Uttarakhand
- Country: India
- Coordinates: 30°44′6.7″N 79°4′0.9″E

Architecture
- Type: Himalayan Architecture
- Elevation: 3,583 m (11,755 ft)

Website
- badrinath-kedarnath.gov.in

Chota Char Dham

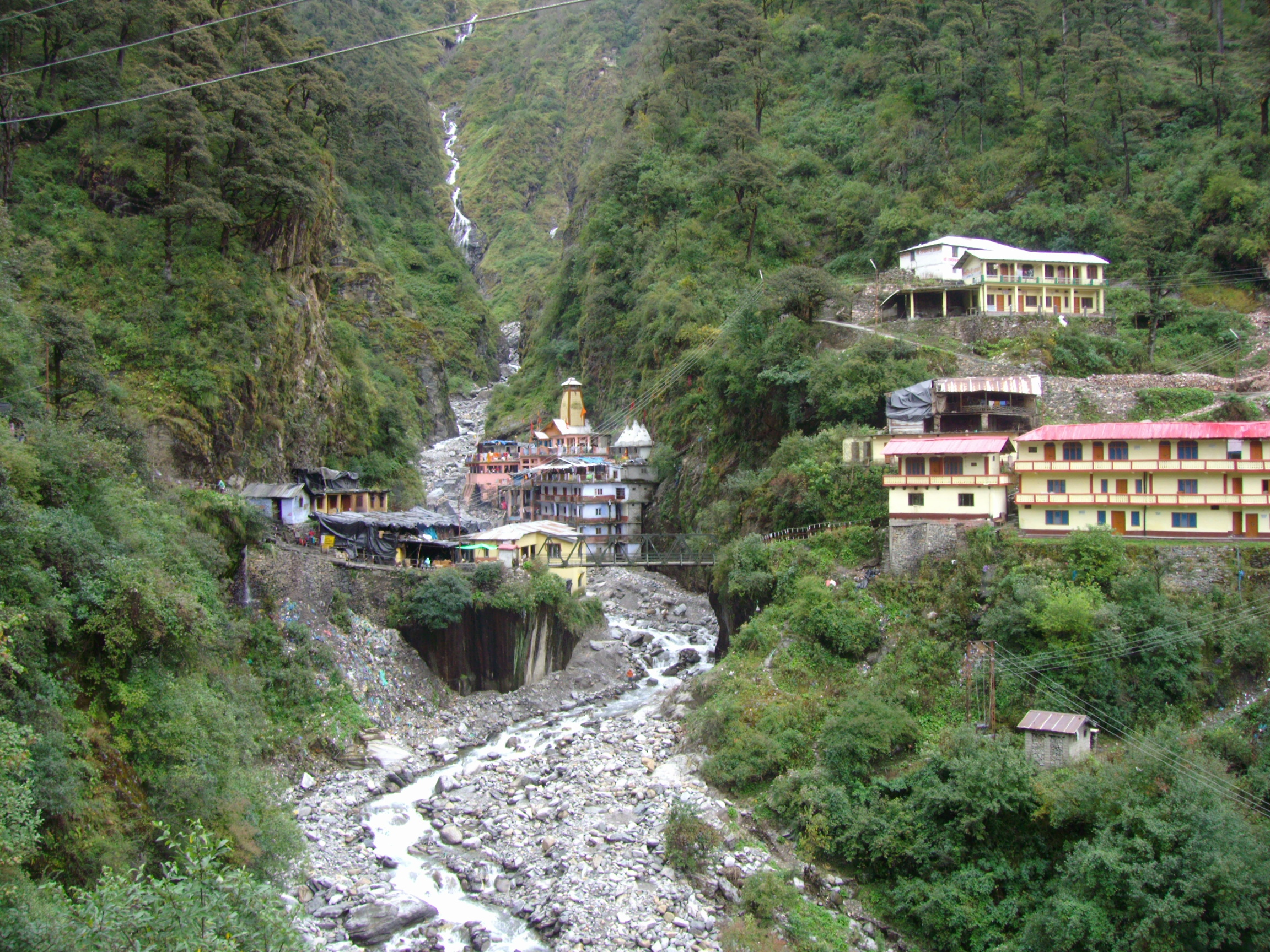
Yamunotri

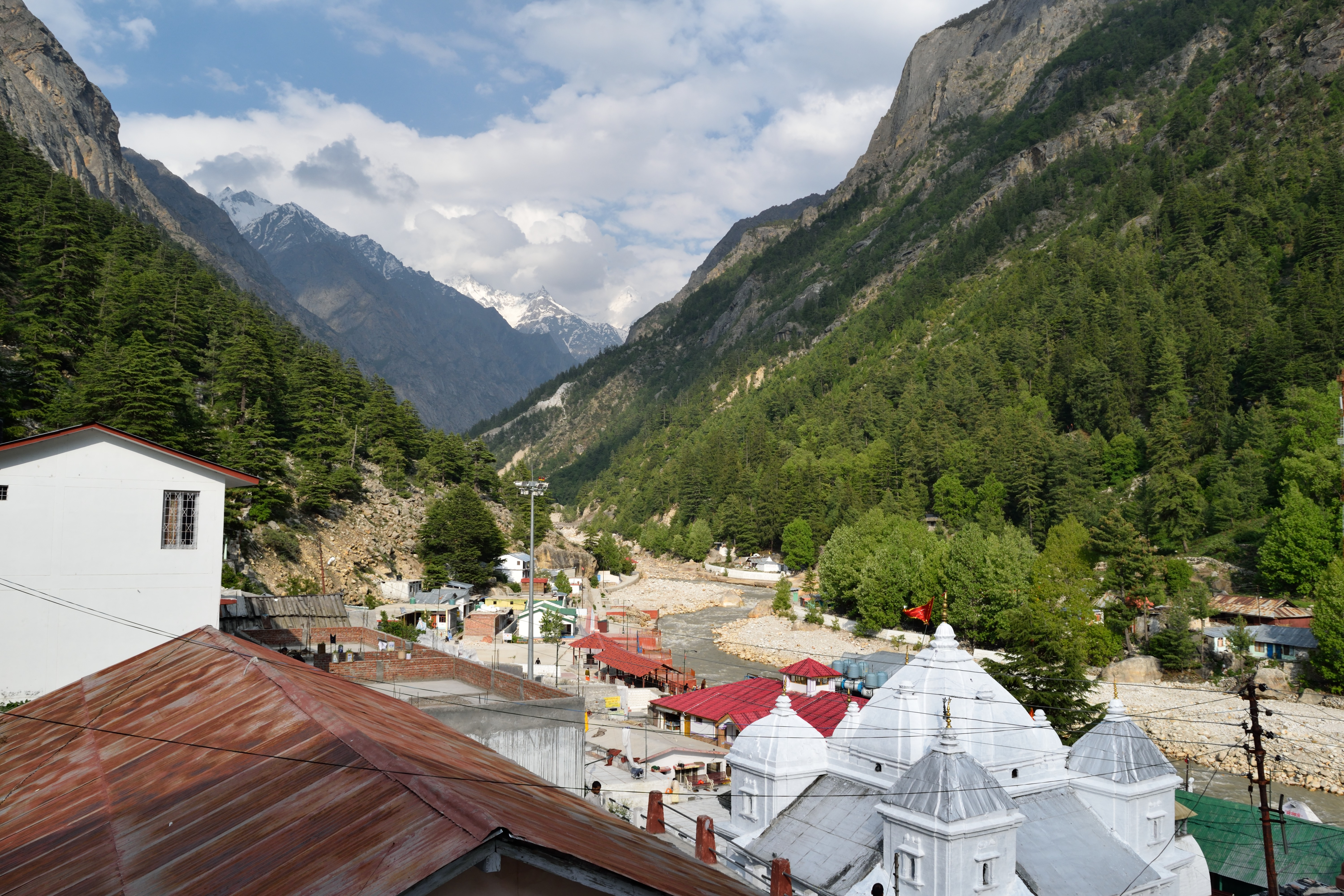
Gangotri

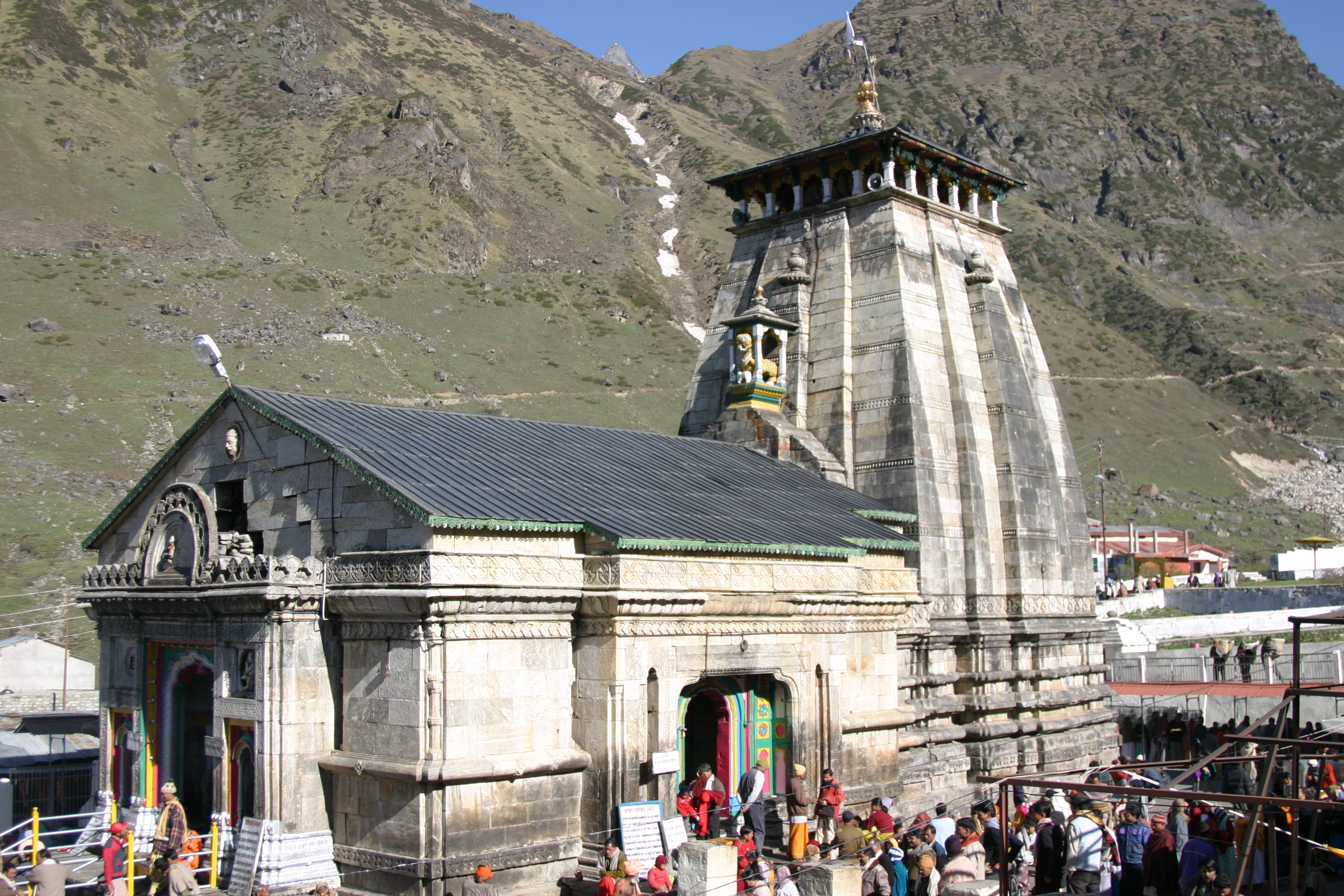
Kedarnath

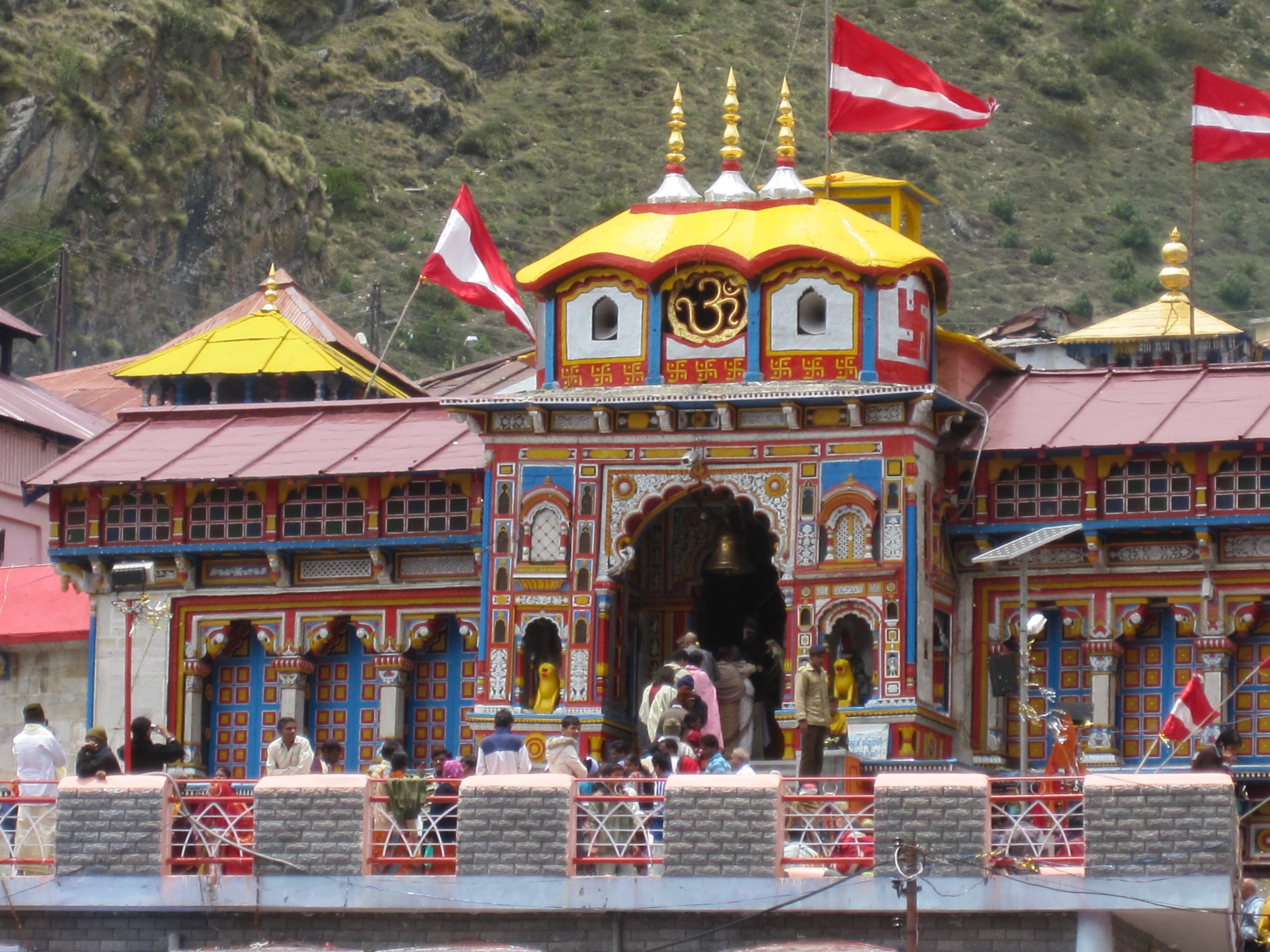
Badrinath

Kēdāranātha Temple (Sanskrit: केदारनाथ मन्दिर, IAST: Kēdāranātha Mandira, lit. 'temple of the God of the field') is a Hindu temple, one of the twelve jyotirlinga of Śiva. The temple is located on the Garhwal Himalayan range near the Mandākinī River, in the state of Uttarakhand, India. Due to extreme weather conditions, the temple is open to the general public only between the months of April (Akṣaya Tritiya) and November (Kārtika Pūrṇimā, the autumn full moon). During the winters, the vigraha (deity) of the temple is carried down to Ukhimath to be worshiped for the next six months. Kēdāranātha is seen as a homogeneous form of Śiva, the 'Lord of Kēdārakhaṇḍa', the historical name of the region.

The temple is not directly accessible by road and has to be reached by a 17 kilometres (11 mi) uphill trek from Gaurikuṇḍa. According to Hindu legends, the temple was initially built by the Pāṇḍavas, and is one of the twelve Jyotirlingas, the holiest Hindu shrines of Śiva. The Pāṇḍava were supposed to have pleased Śiva by doing penance in Kēdāranātha. The temple is one of the four major sites in India's Chota Char Dham pilgrimage of Northern Himalayas and is the first of the Pañca Kēdāra pilgrimage sites. This temple is the highest among the 12 Jyotirlingas. It is one of the 275 paadal petra sthalams expounded in the Tēvaram. This temple is sung of by Tirugnāṇasambandar, Appar, Sundarar and Sekkizhar in their Tēvaram texts.

Kēdāranātha was the worst affected area during the 2013 flash floods in North India. The temple complex, surrounding areas, and Kēdāranātha town suffered extensive damage, but the temple structure did not suffer any major damage. A large rock among the debris acted as a barrier, protecting the temple from the flood.

== Etymology ==
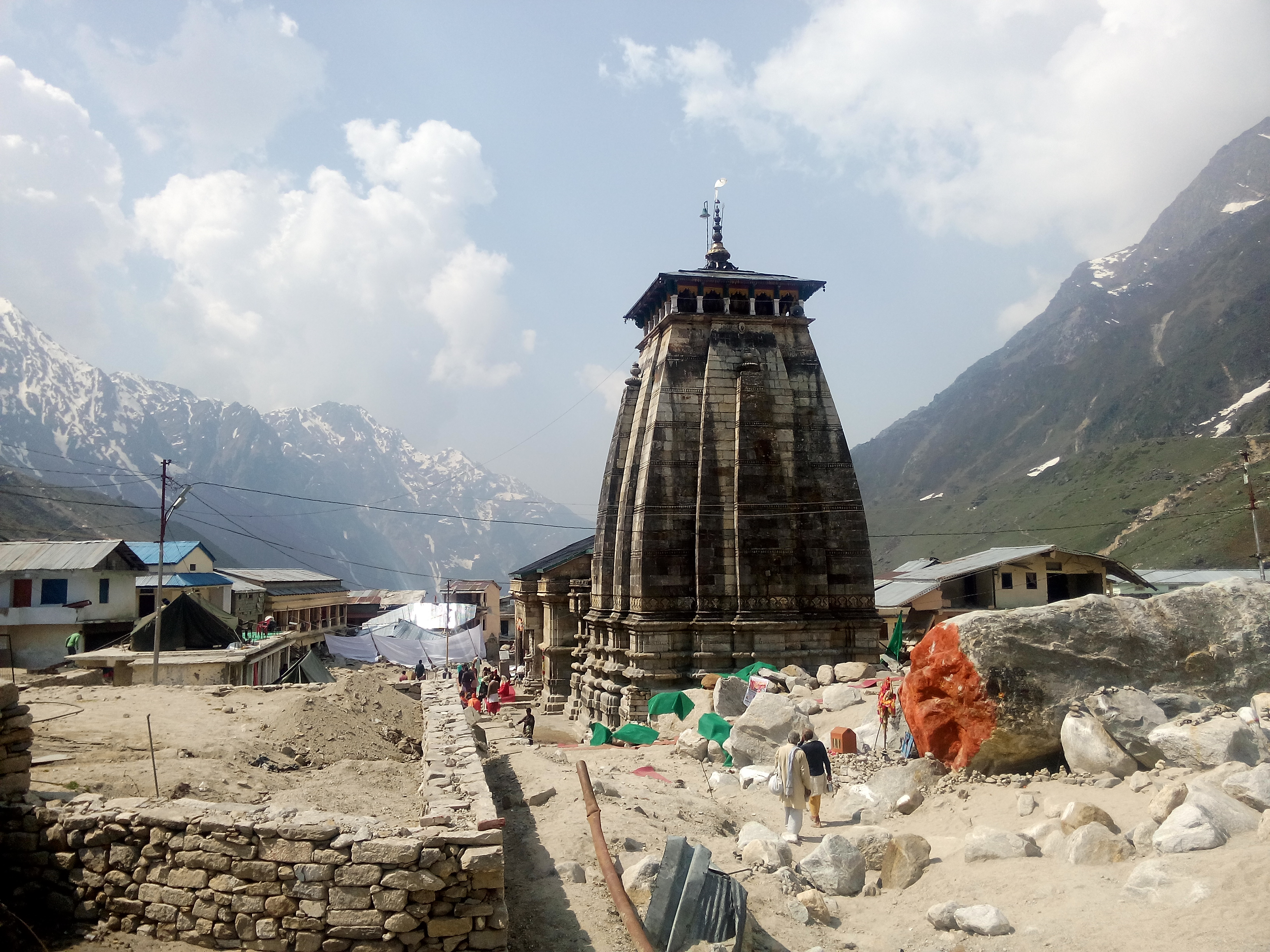
Rear view of the Kedarnath Temple in the aftermath of the flood with the huge rock that protected the temple.

It is not certain who built the original Kedarnath temple and when. The name "Kedarnath" means "the lord of the field": it derives from the Sanskrit words kedara ("field") and natha ("lord"). The text Kashi Kedara Mahatmya states that it is so called because "the crop of liberation" grows here.

== Geography ==
Kedarnath is situated in the Garhwal Himalayas in the Indian state of Uttarakhand, at an elevation of approximately 3,583 meters (11,755 feet) above sea level.

== History ==
=== Earliest written reference ===
At a height of 3,583 m (11,755 ft), 223 km (139 mi) from Rishikesh, on the shores of Mandakini river, a tributary of Ganga, is a stone edifice of unknown date. One of the earliest references to Kedarnath occurs in the Skanda Purana (c. 7th-8th century), which contains a story describing the origin of the Ganges river. The text names Kedara (Kedarnath) as the place where Shiva released the holy water from his matted hair.

According to the hagiographies based on Madhava's Sankshepa-shankara-vijaya, the 8th century philosopher Adi Shankara died at the mountains near Kedarnath; although other hagiographies, based on Anandagiri's Prachina-Shankara-Vijaya, state that he died at Kanchipuram. The ruins of a monument marking the purported death place of Shankara are located at Kedarnath. Kedarnath was definitely a prominent pilgrimage centre by the 12th century, when it is mentioned in Kritya-kalpataru written by the Gahadavala minister Bhatta Lakshmidhara....written by the Gahadavala minister Bhatta Lakshmidhara. Adi Shankara was believed to have revived this temple, along with Badrinath and other temples of Uttarakhand; he is believed to have attained Mahasamadhi at Kedarnath.

== Deities ==
The Kedarnath Temple is dedicated to the Hindu deity Shiva, who is worshipped locally under the name Kedarnath. The presiding image of Kedarnath in the form of three-sided lingam with a pedestal 3.6 m (12 ft) in circumference and 3.6 m (12 ft) in height. The name is derived from Sanskrit, with "Kedarnath" (also rendered as Kedaranatha or Kedareshvara) meaning "Lord of the Marshy Ground". The site is regarded as a dham, a term denoting a particularly sacred abode of a deity. The presence of Shiva at Kedarnath is believed to be svayambhu (self-manifested), indicating that the deity's form is naturally occurring rather than sculpted by human hands. Bhukund Bhairavnath is the guardian deity, kul-devta, associated with the Kedarnath Temple. His open-air shrine is situated on a ridge overlooking the main temple complex.

== Architecture ==
There is a small pillared hall in front of the temple, that has images of Parvati and of the five Pandava princes. There are four temples around Kedarnath itself, namely- Tungnath, Rudranath, Madhyamaheshwar, and Kalpeshwar which form the Panch Kedar pilgrimage sites. The first hall inside Kedarnath Temple contains statues of the five Pandava brothers, Krishna, Nandi, the vehicle of Shiva and Virabhadra, one of the guards of Shiva. Statues of Draupadi and other deities are also installed in the main hall. An unusual feature of the temple is the head of a man carved in the triangular stone lingam. Such a head is seen carved in another temple nearby constructed on the site where the marriage of Shiva and Parvati was held. Behind the temple is the samādhi mandir of Adi Sankara.

== Religious significance ==
=== Rituals ===
The head priest (Raval) of the Kedarnath temple belongs to the Veerashaiva community from Karnataka. However, unlike in Badrinath temple, the Raval of Kedarnath temple does not perform the pujas. The pujas are carried out by Raval's assistants on his instructions. The Raval moves with the deity to Ukhimath during the winter season. There are five main priests for the temple, and they become head priests for one year by rotation. The present (2013) Raval of Kedarnath temple is Shri Vageesha Lingacharya from Davanagere district, Karnataka. Surrounding Kedarnath, there are many symbols of the Pandavas. Raja Pandu died at Pandukeshwar. The locals here perform a dance called "Pandav Lila". The mountain top where the Pandavas went to Swarga, is known as "Swargarohini", which is located off Badrinath. When Yudhishtira, the eldest of the Pandavas, was leaving for the heaven (Swarg), one of his fingers fell on the earth. At that place, Yudhishtira installed a Shiva Linga, which is the size of the thumb. To gain Mashisharupa, Lord Shiva and Bheema fought with maces. Bheema was struck with remorse. He started to massage Shiva's body with ghee. In memory of this event, even today, this triangular Shiva lingam is massaged with ghee.

=== Purohits ===
Kedarnath Teerth Purohits are the ancient Brahmins of this region, their ancestors (Rishi-Muni) have been worshiping the lingam since the time of Nara-Narayana and Daksh Prajapati. King Janmejay, grandson of the Pandavas, gave them the right of worshiping this temple and donate the whole Kedar region, and they have been worshiping pilgrims ever since. Due to reciting Shukla Yajurveda or Bajsen Samhita, these people are called Shukla or Bajpai, being the followers of Madhyandin branch of Shukla Yajurveda, their gotra is Shandilya, Upmanyu, Dhoumya, etc. Pujari of the Jangam community from South India worship the Shiv Linga in the temple, while the puja on behalf of the pilgrims is done by these Tirtha Purohit Brahmins.

According to a tradition recorded by the English mountaineer Eric Shipton (1926), "many hundreds of years ago" one priest used to hold services at both the Kedarnath and Badrinath temples, travelling between the two places daily.

=== Legends ===
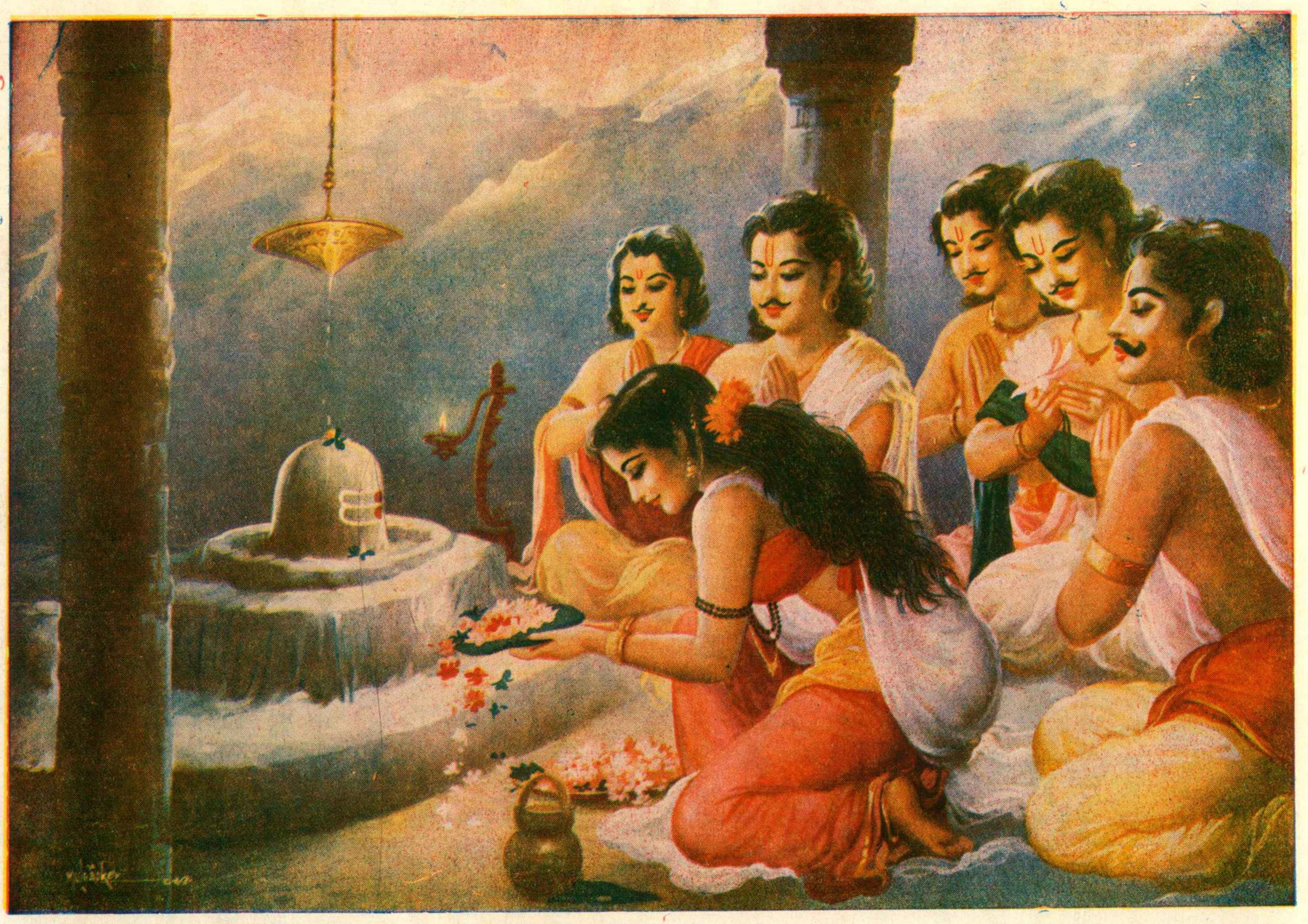
The Pandavas visit Kedarnath after the Mahabharata War.

The Mahabharata, which gives the account of the Pandavas and the Kurukshetra War, does not mention a place called Kedarnath. However, a folk legend associates Kedarnath with the Pandavas, the protagonists of the Hindu epic. According to the legend, the Pandavas sought to atone for the sins committed during the Kurukshetra War. They handed over the reins of their kingdom to their relatives and left in search of Shiva to seek his blessings. However, Shiva wished to avoid them and assumed the form of a bull (Nandi). Bhima, the second of the five Pandava brothers, later saw the bull grazing near Guptakashi, a name meaning "hidden Kashi" that is derived from the hiding act of Shiva. Bhima immediately recognized the bull as Shiva and seized the bull by its tail and hind legs. Shiva in the form of the bull, then disappeared into the ground and later reappeared in parts: with the hump raising in Kedarnath, the arms appearing in Tungnath, the face showing up at Rudranath, the nabhi (navel) and stomach surfacing in Madhyamaheshwar and the hair appearing in Kalpeshwar. The Pandavas, pleased by this manifestation in five different forms, built temples at each site to venerate Shiva. These five shrines are collectively known as Panch Kedar.

After constructing the Panch Kedar temples, the Pandavas meditated at Kedarnath in pursuit of salvation and performed a yagna (fire sacrifice). They then ascended to heaven along the celestial path known as the Mahapanth, also called Swargarohini. The Panch Kedar Temples are constructed in the North-Indian Himalayan Temple architecture with the temples at Kedarnath, Tungnath and Madhyamaheshwar sharing similar designs.

A variant of the tale credits Bhima for not only catching the bull but also stopping it from disappearing. Consequently, the bull was torn asunder into five parts and appeared at five locations in the Kedar Khand of Garhwal region of the Himalayas.

After completing the pilgrimage of Shiva's darshan at the Panch Kedar Temples, it is an unwritten religious rite to visit Vishnu at the Badrinath Temple, as a final affirmatory proof by the devotee that he has sought blessings of Shiva.

== 2013 floods ==
The Kedarnath valley, along with other regions of Uttarakhand, experienced catastrophic flash floods on 16 and 17 June 2013. On 16 June, at about 7:30 p.m. a landslide and mudslides occurred near Kedarnath Temple with loud peals of thunder. An enormously loud peal was heard and huge amounts of water started gushing from Chorabari Tal or Gandhi Tal down Mandakini river at about 8:30 p.m. washing everything away in its path. On 17 June 2013 at about 6:40 a.m. waters again started cascading at a huge speed from river Swaraswati and Chorabari Tal or Gandhi Tal bringing along with its flow huge amount of silt, rocks, and boulders. A huge rock got stuck behind Kedarnath Temple and protected it from the ravages of the flood. The waters gushed on both the sides of the temple destroying everything in their path. Even eyewitness observed that one large rock got carried to the rear side of Kedarnath Temple, thus causing obstruction to the debris, diverting the flow of river and debris to the sides of the temple avoiding damage. The rock which protected the temple is worshipped as the God's Rock (भीम शीला).

Another theory for the temple not being destroyed is because of its construction. Although the temple withstood the severity of the floods, the complex and surrounding area were destroyed, resulting in the death of hundreds of pilgrims and locals. Shops and hotels in Kedarnath were destroyed and all roads were broken. People took shelter inside the temple for several hours, until the Indian Army airlifted them to safer places. The Uttarakhand Chief Minister announced that the Kedarnath shrine would remain closed for a year for clearing the debris.

The experts appointed by the Archaeological Survey of India to assess the condition of the temple's foundation in the wake of the floods concluded that the structure was not in danger. A team from the Indian Institute of Technology Madras visited the temple three times for this purpose. Non-destructive testing instruments that do not disturb the structure of the temple were used by the IIT-team for assessing the health of the structure, foundation, and walls. They have submitted their interim report that the temple is stable and there was no major danger.

Nehru Institute of Mountaineering (NIM) was given the responsibility of rebuilding Kedarnath. Although the institute did not have the expertise in urban planning or construction, they mastered in high altitude training. Under the leadership of veteran mountaineer Colonel Ajay Kothiyal, NIM worked intensively for a year, enabling the resumption of the pilgrimage the following year.

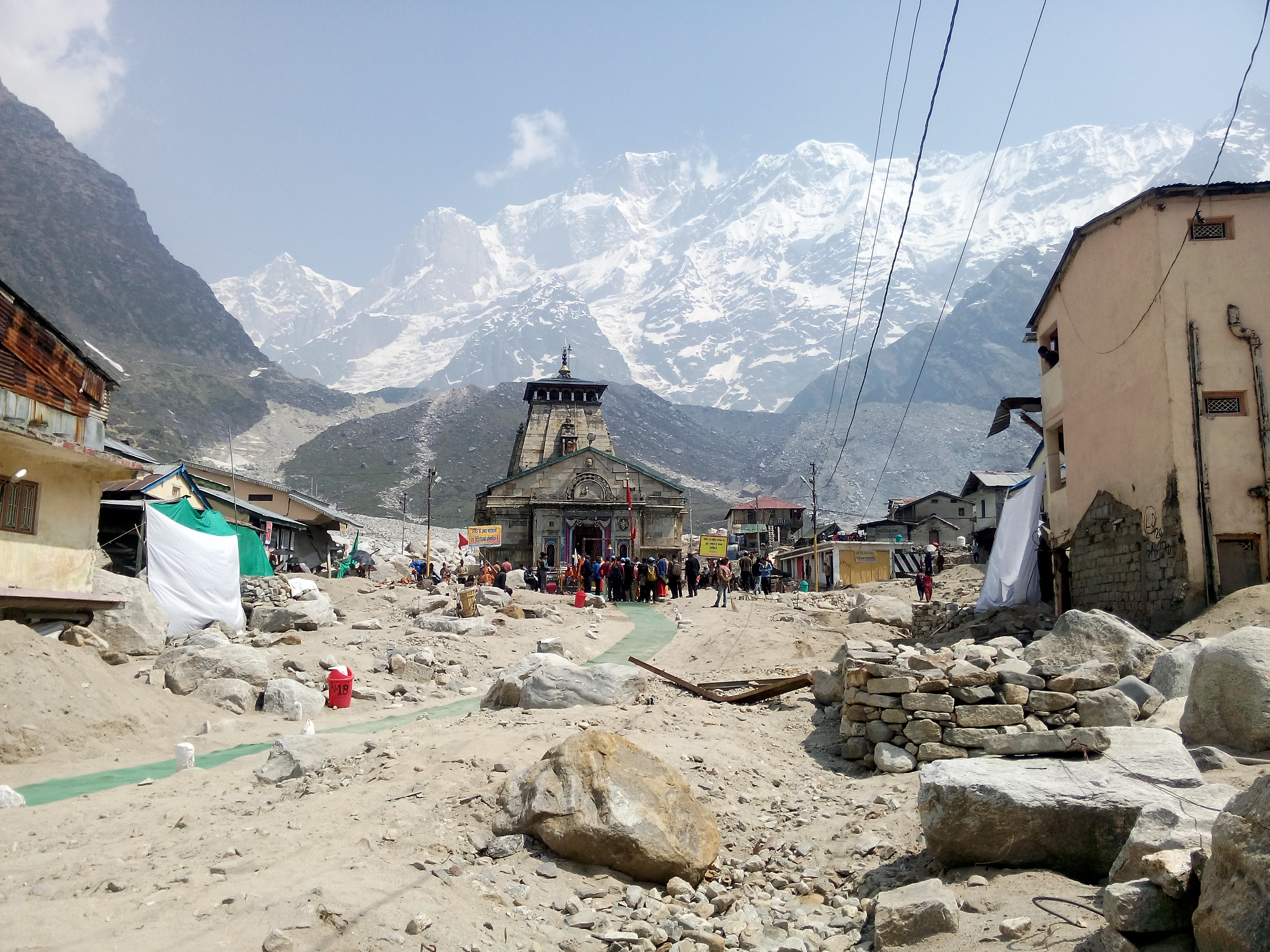
Front view of the Kedarnath Temple in the aftermath of the flood.

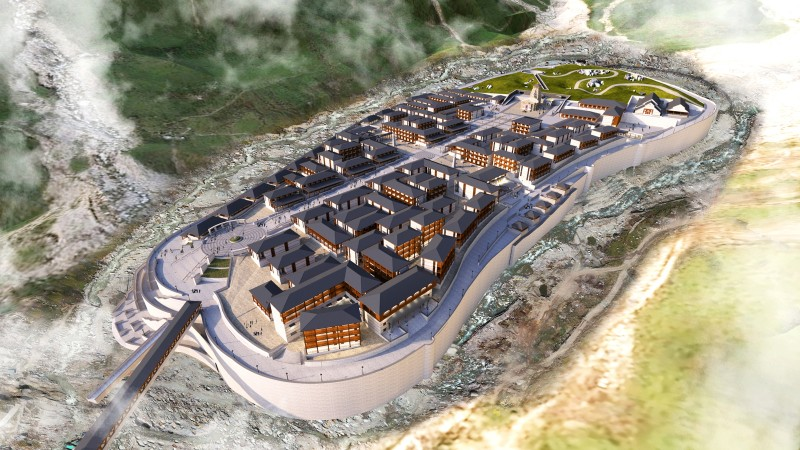
Kedarnath Redevelopment Plan 3D Render by INI Design Studio.

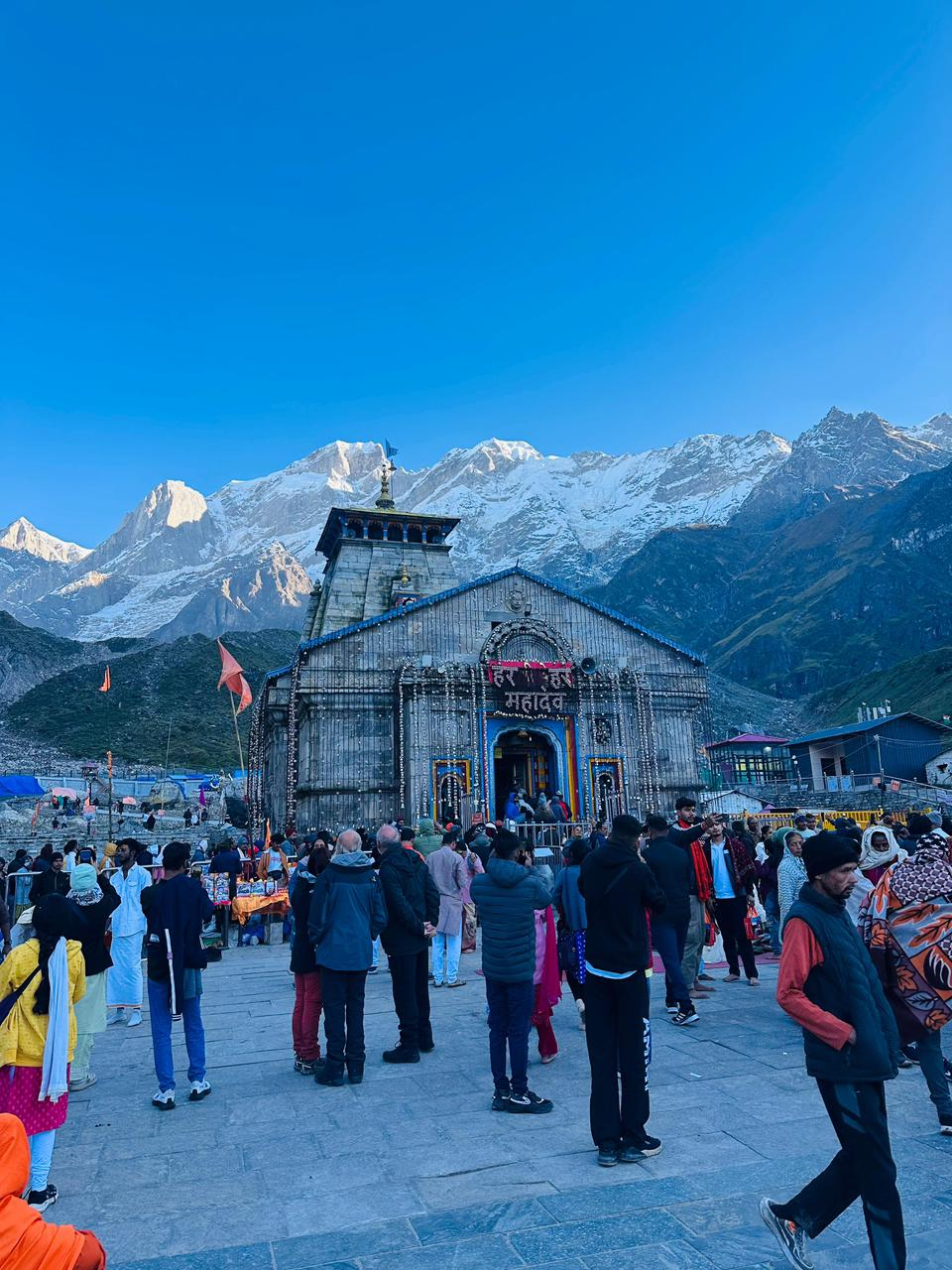
A breathtaking 2026 morning view of Kedarnath Temple.

== Administration ==
Following the partition of Garhwal in 1815 at the close of the Anglo-Nepalese War, Kedarnath fell within directly ruled British Garhwal along with Badrinath. The two were the region's most prominent temples and the principal sources of pilgrim revenue available to the British administration, while the neighbouring princely state of Tehri Garhwal retained the then-undeveloped sites of Gangotri and Yamunotri.

Badrinath was included in the Uttar Pradesh State Government Act No. 30/1948 as Act no. 16,1939, and the committee subsequently extended its remit to Kedarnath and other temples in the area. The committee nominated by the state government administers both temples. The act was modified in 2002 by the Uttarakhand State Government with the formation of Uttarakhand as the 27th State. It provisioned adding additional committee members including government officials and a vice-chairman. There are a total of seventeen members in the board; three selected by the Uttarakhand Legislative Assembly, one member each selected by the District Councils of Chamoli, Pauri Garhwal, Tehri Garhwal and Uttarkashi districts, and ten members nominated by the Government of Uttarakhand. On the religious side, there is a Rawal (chief priest) and three other priests: Naib Rawal, Acharya/Dharmadhikari and Vedpathi. The administrative structure of the temple consists of a chief executive officer who executes the orders from the state government. A deputy chief executive officer, two OSDs, an executive officer, an account officer, a temple officer, and a publicity officer assist the chief executive officer.

In 2019 the Uttarakhand government enacted the Char Dham Devasthanam Management Act, which displaced the temple committee and vested authority over Kedarnath, Badrinath, Gangotri, Yamunotri and 49 other temples in a single statewide board chaired by the Chief Minister. The Uttarakhand High Court upheld the Act in July 2020, holding that the board's authority was confined to the administration and management of temple properties. The Act was opposed by temple priests and their supporters, among them a Kedarnath tirth purohit who wrote to Prime Minister Narendra Modi in his own blood; the state government withdrew it in November 2021.

== Transport ==
- Air/helicopter: Helicopter services are available from locations such as Phata and Sersi, with flight durations averaging 8 to 10 minutes.
- Ropeway: Kedarnath Ropeway is a proposed 12.9-kilometre cable car transportation system project connecting Sonprayag to Kedarnath in Uttarakhand, India. The project, estimated to cost ₹4,081 crore, is being developed under the Government of India's Parvatmala Pariyojana program utilizing public-private partnership model. The ropeway is expected to reduce the current 8–9 hour trek to a 36-minute journey and will be designed to carry up to 1,800 passengers per hour per direction. The ropeway will utilize Tri-cable Detachable Gondola (3S) technology. In September 2025, the construction contract was awarded to the Adani Group.
- Road: The journey to Kedarnath typically begins at Haridwar or Rishikesh, both of which are accessible by road and rail. From there, travelers continue approximately 220 kilometers by road to Gaurikund, the final motorable point. The remaining 17 kilometers to the Kedarnath Temple must be traversed on foot, by pony, by palki (palanquin), or by helicopter. The trek to the temple on foot generally takes between 6 and 8 hours, depending on individual pace and weather conditions.

== See also ==
- Gangotri Temple
- Yamunotri Temple
- Jageshwar
