= Kalpeshwar =

Hindu temple in Uttarakhand, India

Kalpeshwar Temple
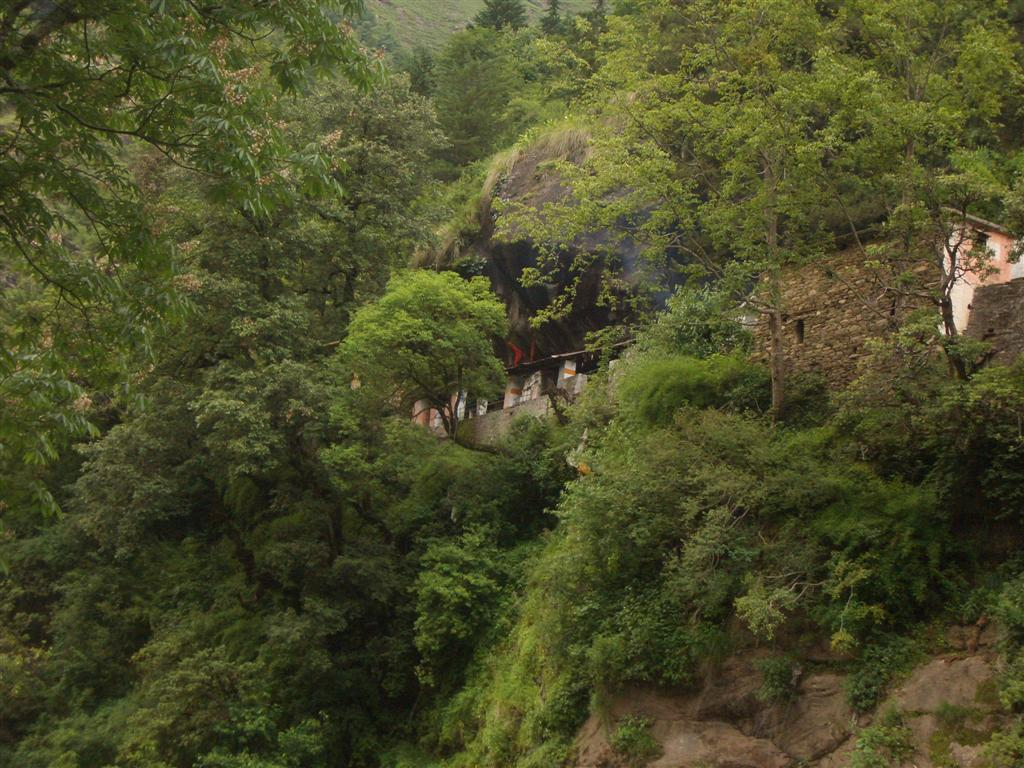
- Kalpeshwar Cave Temple

- Location in Uttarakhand

Religion
- Affiliation: Hinduism
- Deity: Shiva
- Festival: Maha Shivaratri

Location
- State: Uttarakhand
- Country: India
- Coordinates: 30°34′37.35″N 79°25′22.49″E

Architecture
- Type: North-Indian Himalayan Architecture
- Creator: Pandavas (according to legend)
- Completed: Unknown

Kalpeshwar (Sanskrit: कल्पेश्वर) is a Hindu temple dedicated to Shiva located at an elevation of 2,200 m (7,217.8 ft) in the Urgam valley in the Garhwal region of Uttarakhand state in India. The temple's ancient legend linked to the Pandavas, heroes of the epic Mahabharata, is the fifth temple of the Panch Kedar (five temples) of Shiva's five anatomical divine forms; the other four temples in the order of their worship are Kedarnath, Rudranath, Tungnath and Madhyamaheshwar temples; all in the Kedar Khand region of the Garhwal Himalayas. Kalpeshwar is the only Panch Kedar temple accessible throughout the year. At this small stone temple, approached through a cave passage, the matted tress (jata) of Shiva is worshipped. Earlier it was approachable only by 12 km (7.5 mi) trek from the nearest road head of Helang on the Rishikesh-Badrinath road but now the road goes up to Devgram village from where the trek now is just 300 metres. The road is accessible to bicycles and small cars except in monsoons.

== Legend ==
A folk legend about Panch Kedar relates to the Pandavas, the heroes of the Hindu epic Mahabharata. After the Pandavas had defeated and killed their cousins — the Kauravas in the Kurukshetra War, they wished to atone for the sins of committing fratricide (gotra hatya) and Brāhmanahatya (killing of Brahmins — the priest class) during the war. Thus, they handed over the reins of their kingdom to their kin and left in search of lord Shiva and to seek his blessings. First, they went to the holy city of Varanasi (Kashi), believed to be Shiva's favourite city and known for its Kashi Vishwanath Temple. But Shiva wanted to avoid them as he was deeply incensed by the death and dishonesty at the Kurukshetra War and was, therefore, insensitive to Pandavas' prayers. Therefore, he assumed the form of a bull (Nandi) and hid in the Garhwal region.

Not finding Shiva in Varanasi, the Pandavas went to Garhwal Himalayas. Bhima, the second of the five Pandava brothers, then standing astride two mountains started to look for Shiva. He saw a bull grazing near Guptakashi (“hidden Kashi” — the name derived from the hiding act of Shiva). Bhima immediately recognized the bull to be Shiva. Bhima caught hold of the bull by its tail and hind legs. But the bull-formed Shiva disappeared into the ground to later reappear in parts, with the hump raising in Kedarnath, the arms appearing in Tungnath, the face showing up at Rudranath, the nabhi (navel) and stomach surfacing in Madhyamaheshwar and the hair appearing in Kalpeshwar. The Pandavas pleased with this reappearance in five different forms, built temples at the five places for venerating and worshipping Shiva. The Pandavas were thus freed from their sins.

A variant of the tale credits Bhima of not only catching the bull, but also stopping it from disappearing. Consequently, the bull was torn asunder into five parts and appeared at five locations in the Kedar Khand of Garhwal region of the Himalayas.

After completing the pilgrimage of Shiva's darshan at the Panch Kedar Temples, it is an unwritten religious rite to worship Vishnu at the Badrinath Temple.

Worship

The temple priests at this temple also are the Dasnamis and Gossains, disciples of Adi Shankara. At Tungnath also the priests are Khasiya Brahmins. These priests hail from South India; the Namboodiri brahminfrom Kerala sect who worship at Badrinath. at Kedarnath, the Jangamas are Veerashaiva from Mysore in Karnataka. In all these temples the pooja is designed by adi sankara. these priests also are supposed to be appointed by Adi Shankara. The priests at the Rudranath temple are Dasnamis and Gosains.

== Geography ==
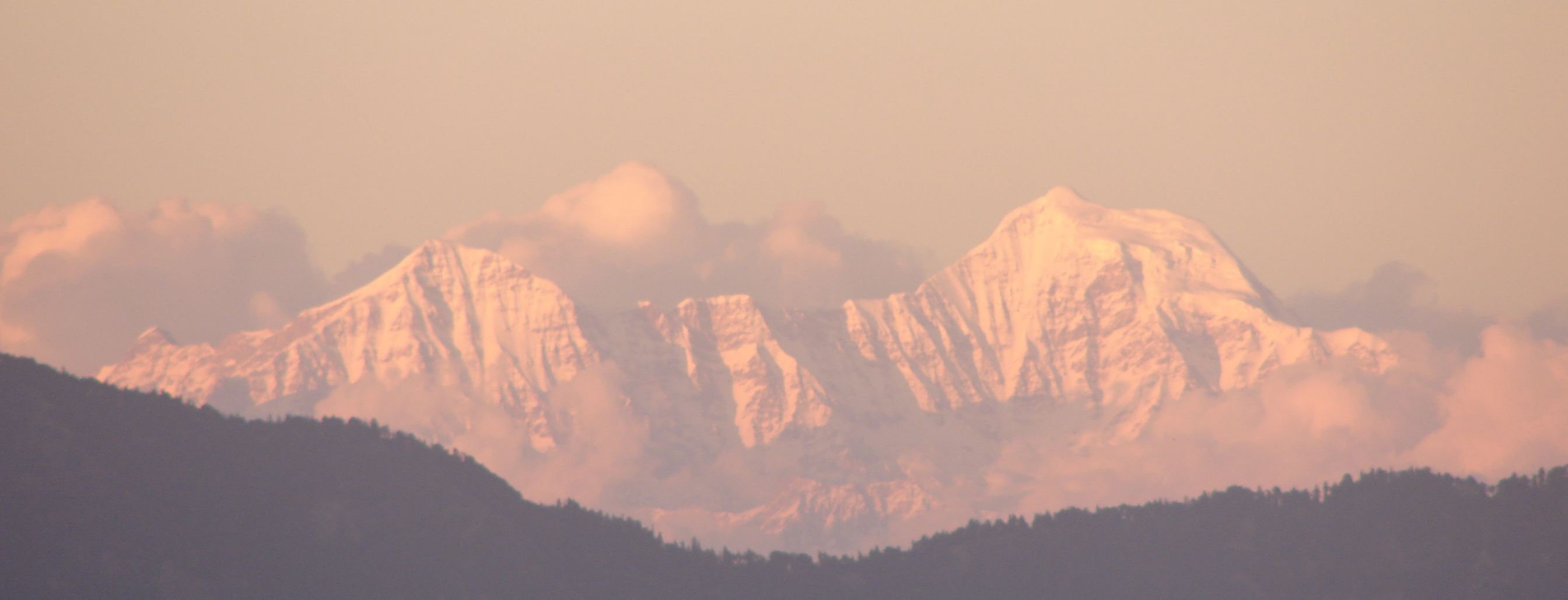
An evening view of snow peaks seen in Garhwal Himalayas

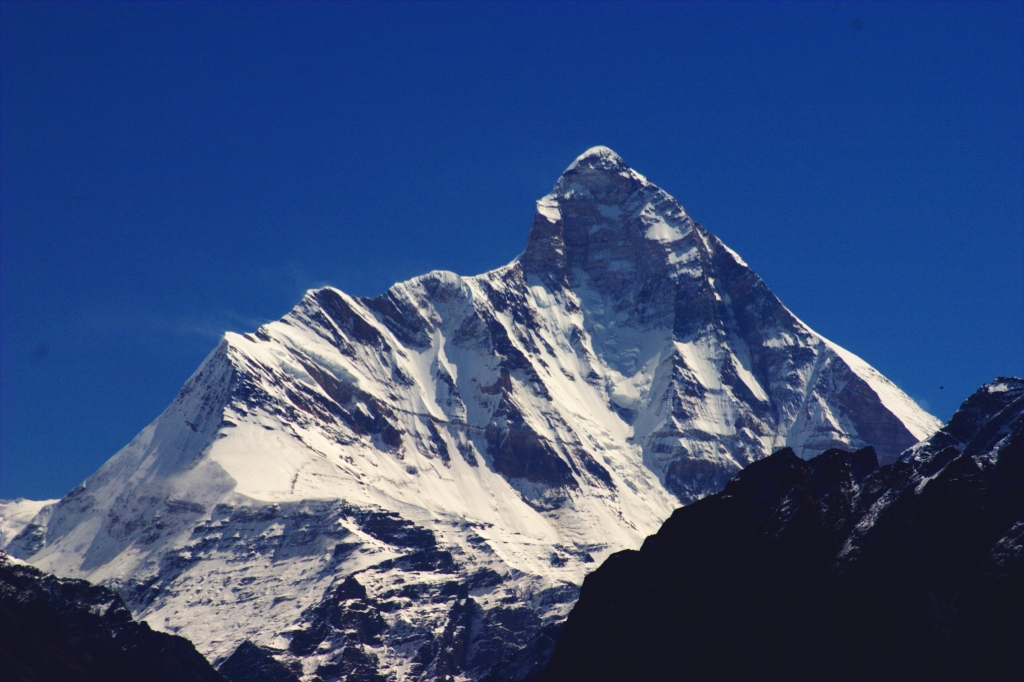
View of nanda devi Peak

The Kalpeshwar temple is located in the Urgam valley of the Himalayan mountain range near Urgam village (2 km (1.2 mi) short of the temple). On the bridle path from Helang to Kalpeshwar, the confluence of the Alaknanda and Kalpganga rivers is seen. Kalpganga river flows through the Urgam valley. The Urgam valley is a dense forest area. The valley has apple orchards and terraced fields where potato is grown extensively.

== Access ==
Access to Kalpeshwar by road up to Urgam is from Rishikesh, a distance of 253 km (157.2 mi) on the Rishikesh-Badrinath road. The road is very rough and not suitable to normal cars, and should only be driven by skilled drivers. The nearest airport is at Jolly Grant, Dehradun, 272 km (169.0 mi) away and the nearest railhead, Rishikesh, is 255 km (158.4 mi) away.

Boodha Kedar temple surrounded by potato fields is seen on the trek route. Also seen is the Dhyan Badri temple at Urgam Village, one of the Sapt Badri (seven Badri) temples.
