= Madhyamaheshwar =

Hindu temple in Gaundar village, Uttarakhand, India

Madhyamaheshwar Temple
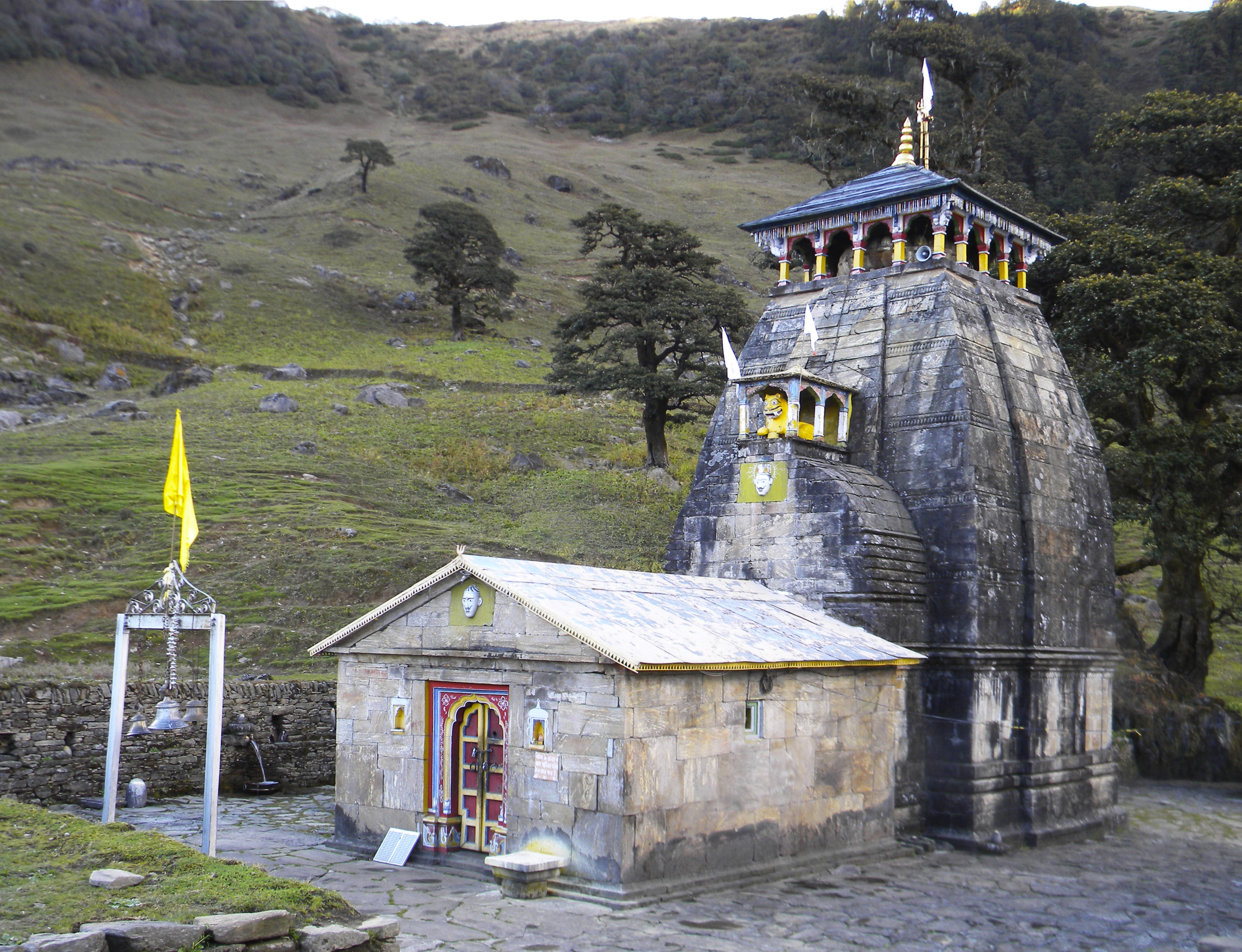
- Madhyamaheshwar Temple

- Location in Uttarakhand

Religion
- Affiliation: Hinduism
- District: Rudraprayag district
- Deity: Shiva
- Festival: Maha Shivaratri

Location
- Location: Gaundar Village, Garhwal
- State: Uttarakhand
- Country: India
- Coordinates: 30°38′13″N 79°12′58″E

Architecture
- Type: North Indian - Himalayan Architecture
- Creator: Pandavas, according to legend
- Completed: unknown

Madhyamaheshwar (Sanskrit: मध्यमहेश्वर) or Madmaheshwar is a Hindu temple dedicated to Shiva, located in Gaundar, a village in Rudraprayag district, situated amidst the Garhwal Himalayas of Uttarakhand, India. Situated at an elevation of 3,497 m (11,473.1 ft), it is one of the Panch Kedar pilgrimage circuits, comprising five Shiva temples in the Garhwal region. The other temples in the circuit include: Kedarnath, Tungnath and Rudranath which are culturally visited before Madhyamaheshwar and, Kalpeshwar generally visited after Madhyamaheshwar. The middle (madhya) or belly part or navel (nabhi) of Shiva is worshipped here. The temple is believed to have been built by the Pandavas, the central figures of the Hindu epic Mahabharata. It is accessible via a 16-18 kilometres treks, either from Aktolidhar or Ransi village near Ukhimath in the Rudraprayag district.

== Legend ==
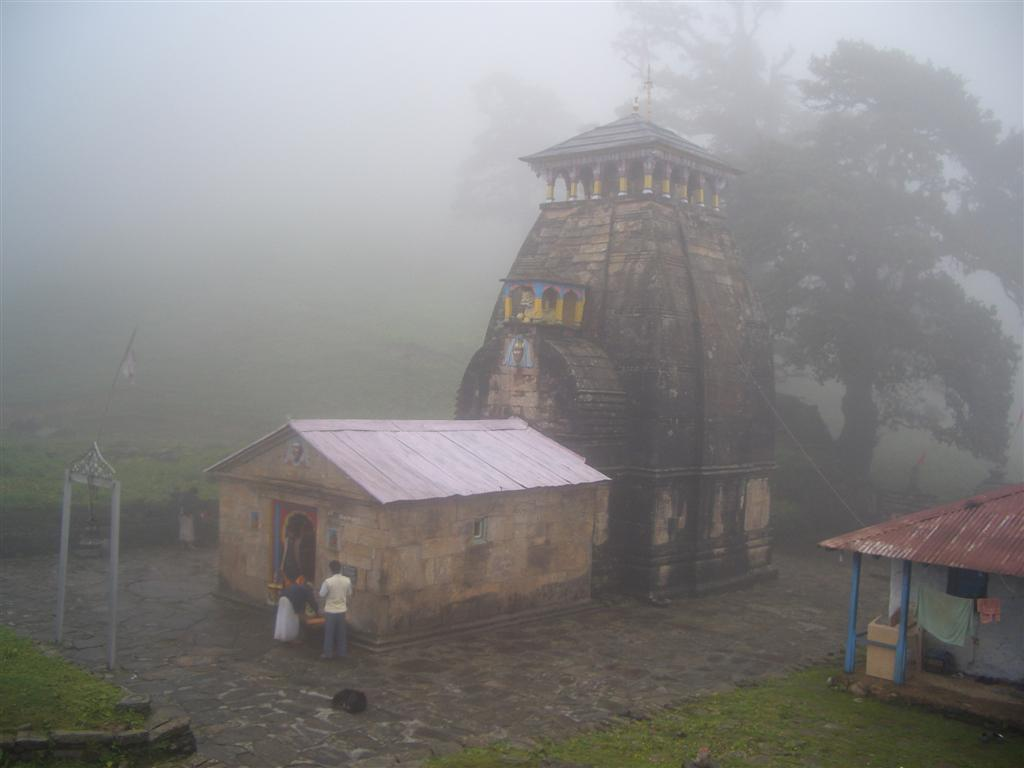
Early morning view of the temple in foggy weather

Several folk legends exist surrounding the Garhwal region, Shiva and the creation of the Panch Kedar temples.

One folklore relates to the Pandavas, the heroes of the Hindu epic Mahabharata. The Pandavas defeated and slayed their cousins — the Kauravas in the epic Kurukshetra War. They wished to atone for the sins of committing fratricide (gotra hatya) and Brāhmanahatya (killing of Brahmins — the priest class) during the war. Thus, they handed over the reins of their kingdom to their kin and left in search of Shiva and to seek his blessings. First, they went to the holy city of Varanasi (Kashi), believed to be Shiva's favourite city and known for its Kashi Vishwanath Temple. But Shiva wanted to avoid them as he was deeply incensed by the death and dishonesty at the Kurukshetra War and therefore, disregarded Pandavas' prayers. He assumed the form of a bull (Nandi) and hid in the Garhwal region.

Not finding Shiva in Varanasi, the Pandavas went to Garhwal Himalayas. Bhima, the second of the five Pandava brothers, then standing astride two mountains started to look for Shiva. He saw a bull grazing near Guptakashi (“hidden Kashi” — the name derived from the hiding act of Shiva). Bhima immediately recognized the deity and caught hold of the bull by its tail and hind legs. But the bull-formed Shiva disappeared into the ground to later reappear in parts, with the hump raising in Kedarnath, the arms appearing in Tungnath, the face showing up at Rudranath, the nabhi (navel) and stomach surfacing in Madhyamaheshwar and the hair appearing in Kalpeshwar. The Pandavas pleased with this reappearance in five different forms, built temples at the five places for venerating and worshipping Shiva. The Pandavas were thus freed from their sins.

A variant of the tale credits Bhima of not only catching the bull, but also stopping it from disappearing. Consequently, the bull was torn asunder into five parts and appeared at five locations in the Kedar Khand of Garhwal region of the Himalayas. After building the Panch Kedar Temples, the Pandavas meditated at Kedarnath for salvation, performed yagna (fire sacrifice) and then through the heavenly path called the Mahapanth (also called Swargarohini), attained heaven or salvation.. The Panch Kedar Temples are constructed in the North-Indian Himalayan Temple architecture with the Kedarnath, Tungnath and Madhyamaheshwar temples looking similar.

After completing the pilgrimage of Shiva's darshan at the Panch Kedar Temples, it is an unwritten religious rite to visit Vishnu at the Badrinath Temple, as a final affirmatory proof by the devotee that he has sought blessings of Shiva.

== The temple ==
The temple in the North-Indian Himalayan style of architecture, is situated in a lush meadow, just below a high ridge. The older, so-called 'Vriddh-Madmaheshwar', temple is a tiny blackened shrine on the ridge, which looks straight up at the Chaukhamba Mountain peaks. In the current temple, a navel-shaped Shiva-lingam, made of black stone, is enshrined in the sanctum. There are two other smaller shrines, one for Shiva's consort Parvati and the other dedicated to Ardhanarishwara, a half-Shiva half-Parvati image. Bhima, the second Pandava brother is believed to have built this temple and worshipped Shiva here. To the right of the main temple there is a small temple where the image of Saraswati, the Hindu goddess of learning, made of marble is installed in the sanctum.

== Worship ==
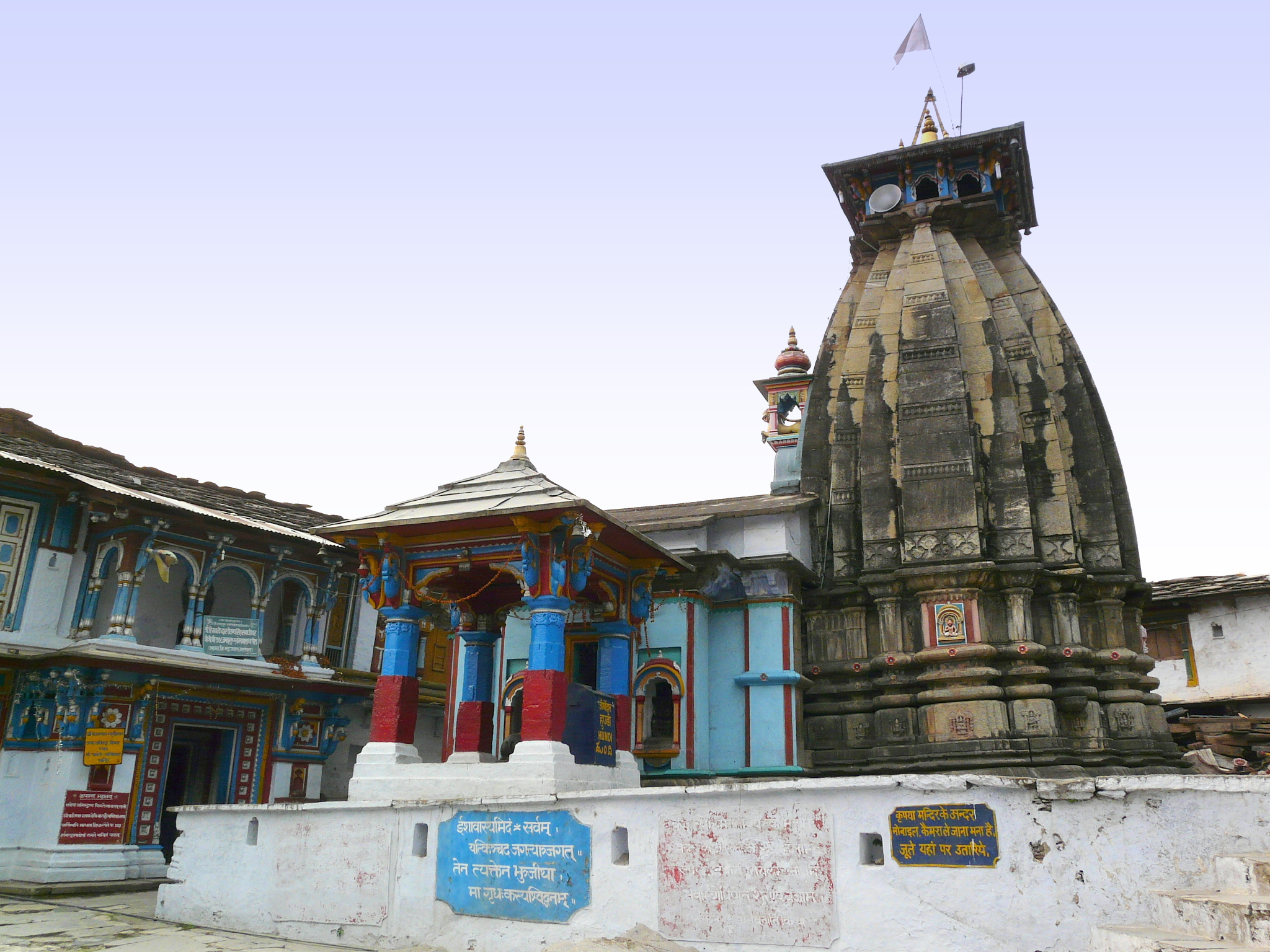
The Kedarnath and Madhyamaheshwar idols are worshipped at the Omkareshwar Temple in Ukhimath (pictured) during the winter months

The water from the temple precincts is considered so highly sacred that even a few drops are stated to be adequate for ablution. The worship at this temple starts with a specified time period from the beginning of the summer months after the winter and lasts until October/November from start of the winter season when the temple precincts are not accessible due to snow conditions.

During the winter period, the symbolic idol of the god is shifted with religious formalities to Ukhimath for continued worship. Priests at this temple, as in many other temples in the state, are from South India and at this particular temple they are called Jangamas of the Veerashaiva cast who hail from Mysore in Karnataka state. This induction of priests from outside the state enhances the cultural communications from one part of the country to the other, with language becoming no barrier. It is one of the important sacred pilgrimage centres of shastrik (textual) importance under the Panchasthali (five places) doctrine. This doctrine has been determined on the basis of sectarian association, fairs and festivals, offerings to the deity, sacred declarations made by devotees and specific blessings sought from the god through prayers at different temples. 2 km. away is a small temple called Bura Madhyamaheswar. One has to trek 2 kilometers up the steep ways through large moors and valleys and then would reach in a small lake, where a full Panoramic range of Himalayas consisting of the peaks, Chaukhamba, Kedarnath, Neelkanth, Trishul, Kamet, Panchulli, etc.

== Geography ==
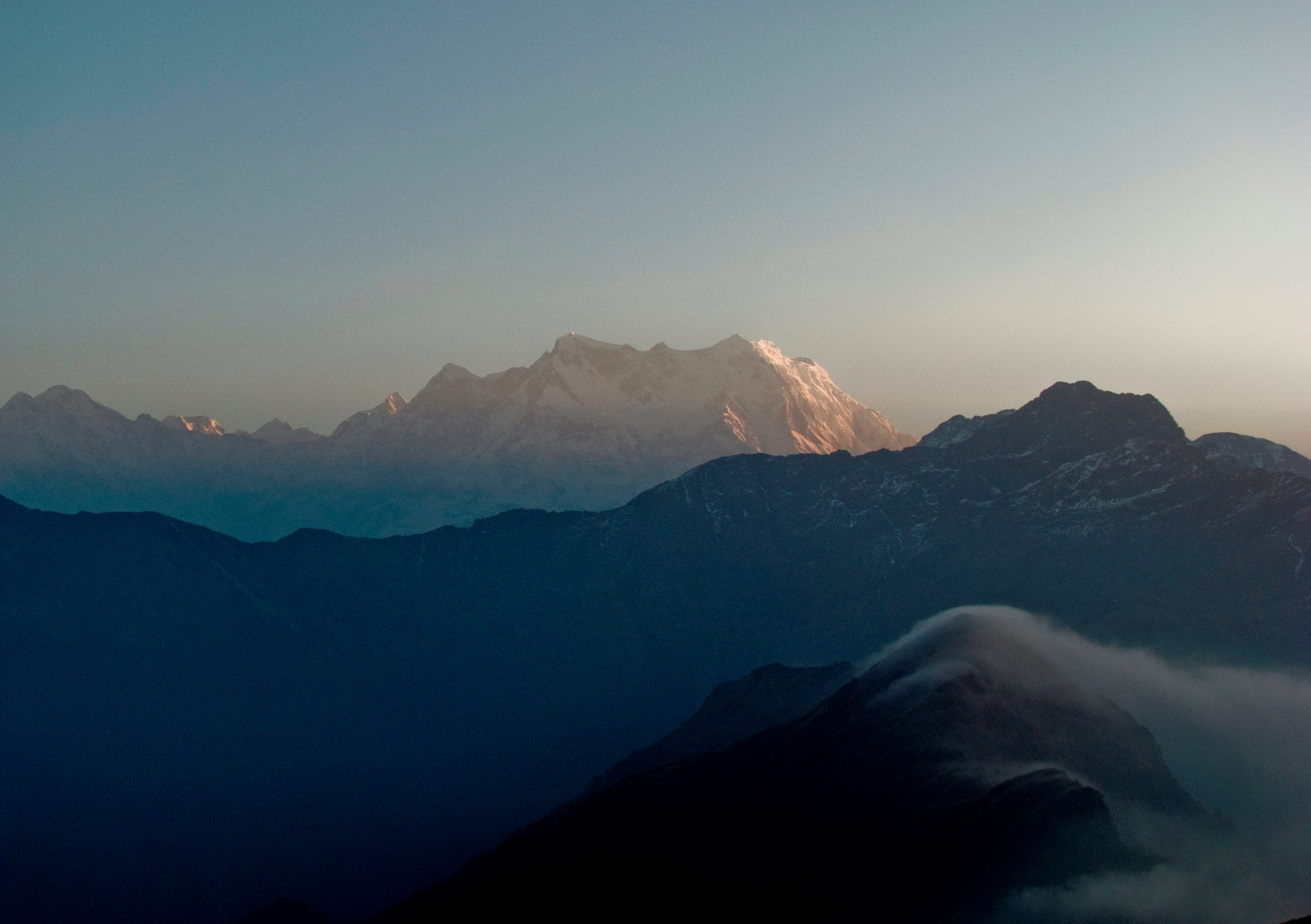
Chaukhamba (four peaks) range

The temple is in a green valley surrounded by snow peaks of Chaukhamba (literal meaning is four pillars or peaks), Neel Kanth and Kedarnath in high Himalayan hill ranges. The Kedar hills, called the Kedar Massif, gives a view of the mountain formation with a number of glaciers which include the source of the Mandakini River. The region has rich flora and fauna, particularly the endangered species of Himalayan monal pheasant and Himalayan musk deer (locally called Kasturi deer) in the Kedarnath Wild Life Sanctuary.

== Access ==
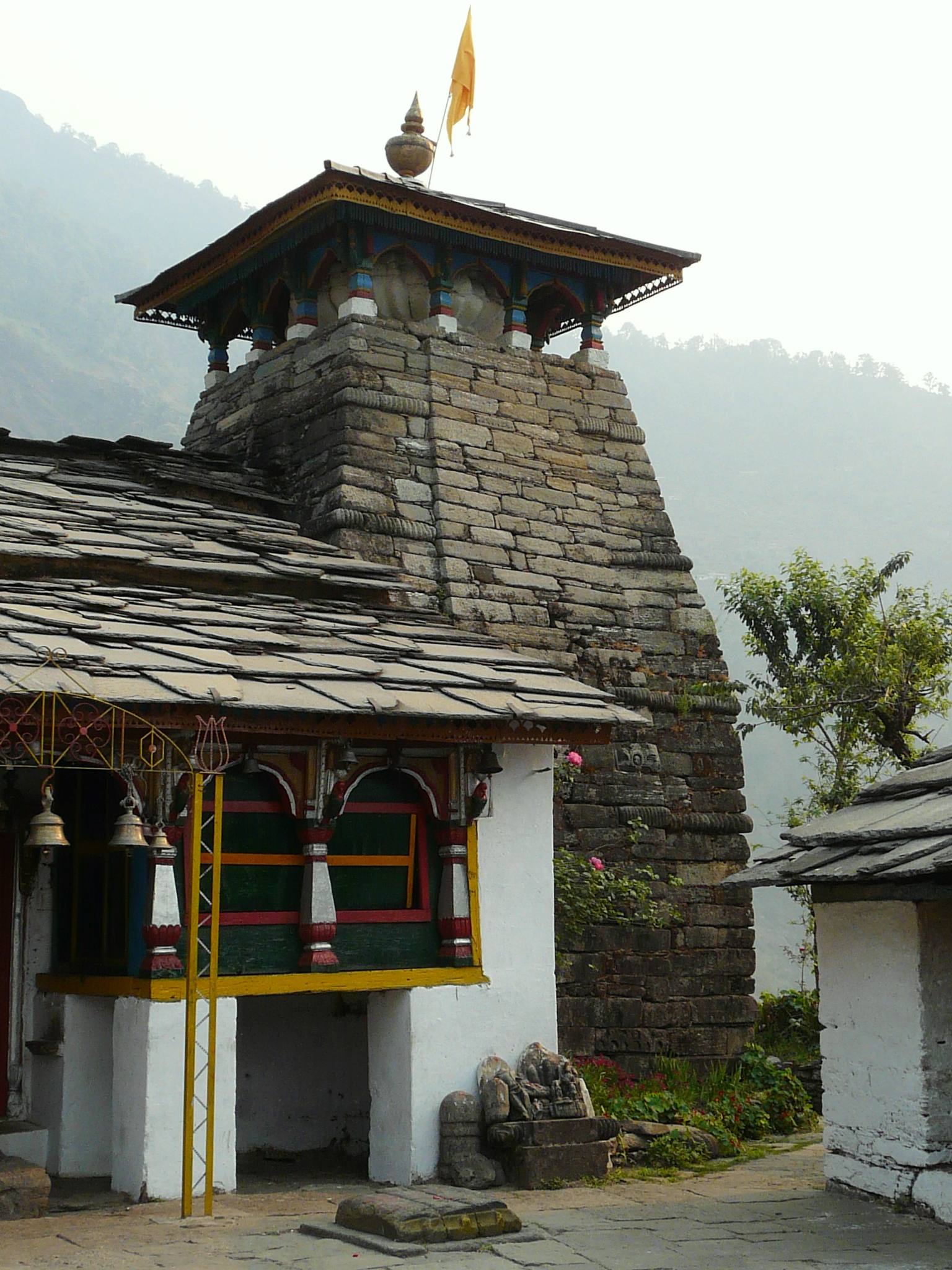
The Ransi Temple on the way to Madhyamaheshwar

The best time to visit the temple is from April to September. It is advised to visit before the month of October to avoid harsh weather conditions. Total trek length to cover all the five temples of Panch Kedar is about 170 km (105.6 mi) (including road travel up to Gaurikund), involving 16 days of effort. The trek starts from Gauri Kund, from which there are views of the Himalayan range of hills and the broader Garhwal region, comparable to the Alps.

The trekking is undertaken during two seasons; three months during summer and two months after the monsoon season, as during the rest of the period, except Kalpeshwar, the other four Panch Kedar temples are inaccessible due to snow cover

Madyamaheswar temple is located in the Rudraprayag district of Uttarakhand. The temple is not directly connected by road. The last motrable place on the route of Madyamaheswar is Ransi village. After Kund ( near Ukhimath), the Kedarnath route divides into two parts: one goes to Gaurikund and another goes to Madyamaheswar. The Madyamaheswar route goes to Ukhimath, and after Ukhimath, one road goes to Tungnath and another goes to Madyamaheswar. Rishikesh is the entry point to the pilgrim centres of Garhwal Himalayas and is connected by train to the rest of the country. The nearest airport is Jolly Grant at a distance of 18 km (11.2 mi) from Rishikesh, closer to Dehradun, which connects to other destinations in India. The temple is at a distance of 244 km (151.6 mi) from the airport and 227 km (141.1 mi) from Rishikesh, the rail head. From Rishikesh to Kalimath the road distance is 196 km (121.8 mi). Alternatively, Madhmaheshwar shrine could be reached from Mansoona, Buruwa and Uniyana, via Ukhimath. From Ukhimath, the route passes through Mansoona(7 km), Buruwa(4 km), Ransi (3 km) then Goundar (9 km), Bantoli (2 km) and further 10 km steep climb via Khatra Khal, Maikhumbachatti and kunchatti reach the temple

The base of the trek is Aktolidhar/Ransi which is 22-24 kilometres away from Ukhimath. From there the trekking way starts. After 6 kilometres is Goundar village a small chatti, with a place to stay where there are 3 lodges to stay. After 2 km lies Bantoli, the point of confluence of Saraswati Ganga and Morkhanda Ganga then it's called Madhyamaheshwar ganga Or Madhu ganga. Then comes Khatara, Nanu, Maikhambachatti, Kunchatti and then comes Madhyamaheswar. The proper trekking distance is 16-18 kilometres from Aktolidhar/Ransi.

Gaundhar and Kalimath are two important places on the route to Madhyamaheshwar. (However route for kalimath get changed before Ukhimath it's on Kedarnath route.) Kalimath (1,463 m (4,799.9 ft)) in particular, is of importance for the large number of pilgrims who visit the place for spiritual comfort and hence it is called the Sidh Peeth (Spiritual center). Kalimath is famous for the temples to goddesses Mahakali and Mahalakshmi, and Shiva and one of his ferocious forms - Bhairava. The Navaratri time is of special significance at this place when much large devotees visit the place.
