= Rudranath =

Hindu temple in Uttarakhand, India

Rudranath Temple
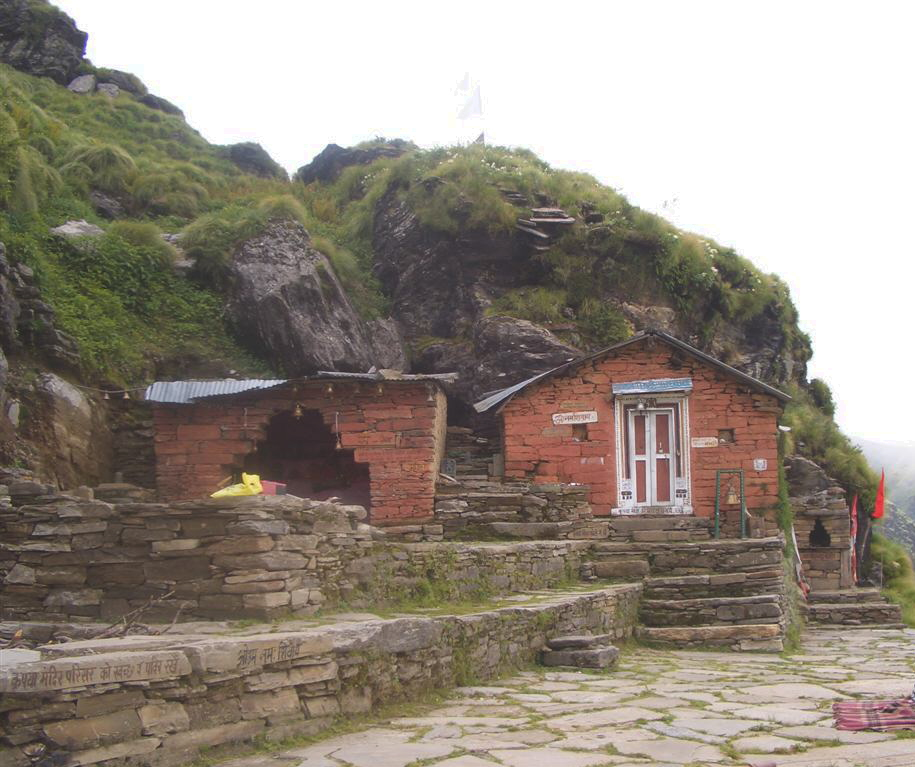
- Rudranath Temple

- Location in Uttarakhand

Religion
- Affiliation: Hinduism
- District: Chamoli Garhwal
- Deity: Shiva
- Festival: Maha Shivaratri

Location
- Location: Rudranath (village), Garhwal
- State: Uttarakhand
- Country: India
- Coordinates: 30°32′0″N 79°20′0″E

Architecture
- Type: North-indian Himalayan Architecture
- Creator: Pandavas, according to legend
- Completed: unknown
- Elevation: 2,290 m (7,513 ft)

Rudranath Temple (Sanskrit: रुद्रनाथ) is a Hindu temple dedicated to Shiva, located in the Garhwal Himalayan mountains in Uttarakhand, India. Located at 2,290 metres (7,510 ft) above sea level, this natural rock temple is situated within a dense forest of rhododendron dwarfs and Alpine pastures. The temple is the fourth temple to be visited in the Panch Kedar pilgrimage circuit, comprising five Shiva temples in the Garhwal region visited in a strict order starting with Kedarnath (Sanskrit: केदारनाथ) at an altitude of 3,583 m (11,755 ft), the Tungnath (तुंगनाथ)(3,680 m or 12,070 ft), Rudranath (रुद्रनाथ) (3,550 m or 11,500 ft), Madhyamaheshwar (मध्यमहेश्वर) (3,490 m or 11,450 ft) and Kalpeshwar (कल्पेश्वर) (2,200 m or 7,200 ft).

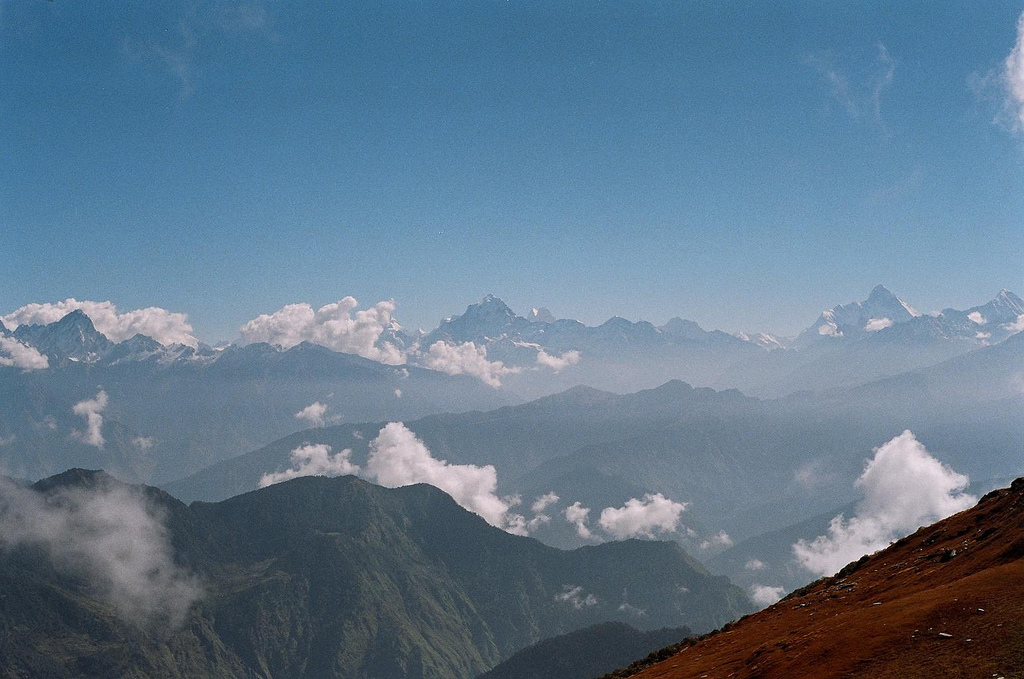
View from Naola Pass

== Legends and worship ==
The Rudranath Temple is believed to be established by the Pandavas, of the Hindu epic Mahabharata. After the Pandavas had defeated and killed their cousins — the Kauravas in the Kurukshetra War, they wished to atone for the sins of committing fratricide (gotra hatya) and Brāhmanahatya (killing of Brahmins — the priest class) during the war. Thus, they handed over the reins of their kingdom to their kin and left in search of lord Shiva and to seek his blessings. First, they went to the holy city of Varanasi (Kashi), believed to be Shiva's favourite city and known for its Kashi Vishwanath Temple. But, Shiva wanted to avoid them as he was deeply incensed by the death and dishonesty at the Kurukshetra War and was, therefore, insensitive to Pandavas' prayers. Therefore, he assumed the form of a bull (Nandi) and hid in the Garhwal region.

Not finding Shiva in Varanasi, the Pandavas went to Garhwal Himalayas. Bhima, the second of the five Pandava brothers, then standing astride two mountains started to look for Shiva. He saw a bull grazing near Guptakashi (“hidden Kashi” — the name derived from the hiding act of Shiva). Bhima immediately recognized the bull to be Shiva. Bhima caught hold of the bull by its tail and hind legs. But the bull-formed Shiva disappeared into the ground to later reappear in parts, with the hump appearing in Kedarnath, the arms appearing in Tungnath, the face appearing at Rudranath, the nabhi (navel) and stomach appearing in Madhyamaheshwar and the hair appearing in Kalpeshwar. The Pandavas pleased with this reappearance in five different forms, built temples at the five places for venerating and worshipping Shiva. The Pandavas were thus freed from their sins.

A variant of the tale credits Bhima of not only catching the bull, but also stopping it from disappearing. Consequently, the bull was torn asunder into five parts and appeared at five locations in the Kedar Khand of Garhwal region of the Himalayas. After building the Panch Kedar Temples, the Pandavas meditated at Kedarnath for salvation, performed yagna (fire sacrifice) and then through the heavenly path called the Mahapanth (also called Swargarohini), attained heaven or salvation. The Panch Kedar Temples are constructed in the North-Indian Himalayan Temple architecture with the Kedarnath, Tungnath and Madhyamaheshwar temples looking similar.

After completing the pilgrimage of Lord Shiva's darshan at the Panch Kedar Temples, it is an unwritten religious rite to visit Lord Vishnu at the Badrinath Temple, as a final affirmatory proof by the devotee that he has sought blessings of Lord Shiva.

In winter, a symbolic image of Shiva is brought from Rudranath to Gopinath Mandir in Gopeshwar for worship. The Doli Yatra starts from Gopeshwar via Sagar. The Doli Yatris cross Lyuti Bugyal and Panar and finally reach Pitradhar. The worship of ancestors is done here. Then, after crossing Dhalabni Maidan, the Doli or the symbolic image of Shiva, reaches Rudranath.Here first the Vandevi is worshipped. The local belief is that Vandevi protects the area. The place is protected by Vandevi or Vandevatas. The temple celebrates an annual fair on the full moon day in the Hindu month of Sravan (July–August) that is mostly on the day of Rakshabandhan. The fair is attended mainly by locals. The priests at the Rudranath temple are Bhatts and Tiwaris of Gopeshwar.

At Nandikund (2,439 m or 8,002 ft), on the trekking route to Rudranath (if coming via Madhmaheshwar), devotees worship old historic swords protruding from the rocks, believed to be that of Pandavas.

== Geography ==
There are numerous sacred water tanks ("Kund") near the temple. These include Surya-kund, Chandra-kund, Tara-kund, Mana-Kund etc. Nanda Devi, Trishul and Nanda Ghunti are the famous mountain peaks, which provide the backdrop to the temple. The holy river Vaitarani or Baitarani or Rudraganga flows near the temple, which has a grey stone idol of Rudranath. The river is identified with the "river of salvation", where souls of the dead cross to reach the other world. Thus, devotees visit Rudranath to perform rituals of the dead, such as performing a pind offering. Some believe that offering a pind to ancestors here equals offering a hundred million at the holy city of Gaya. The mountain peaks of Trisul, Nanda Devi, Devasthan, Hathi Parbat and Nanda Ghunti are visible from Rudranath.

== Access ==
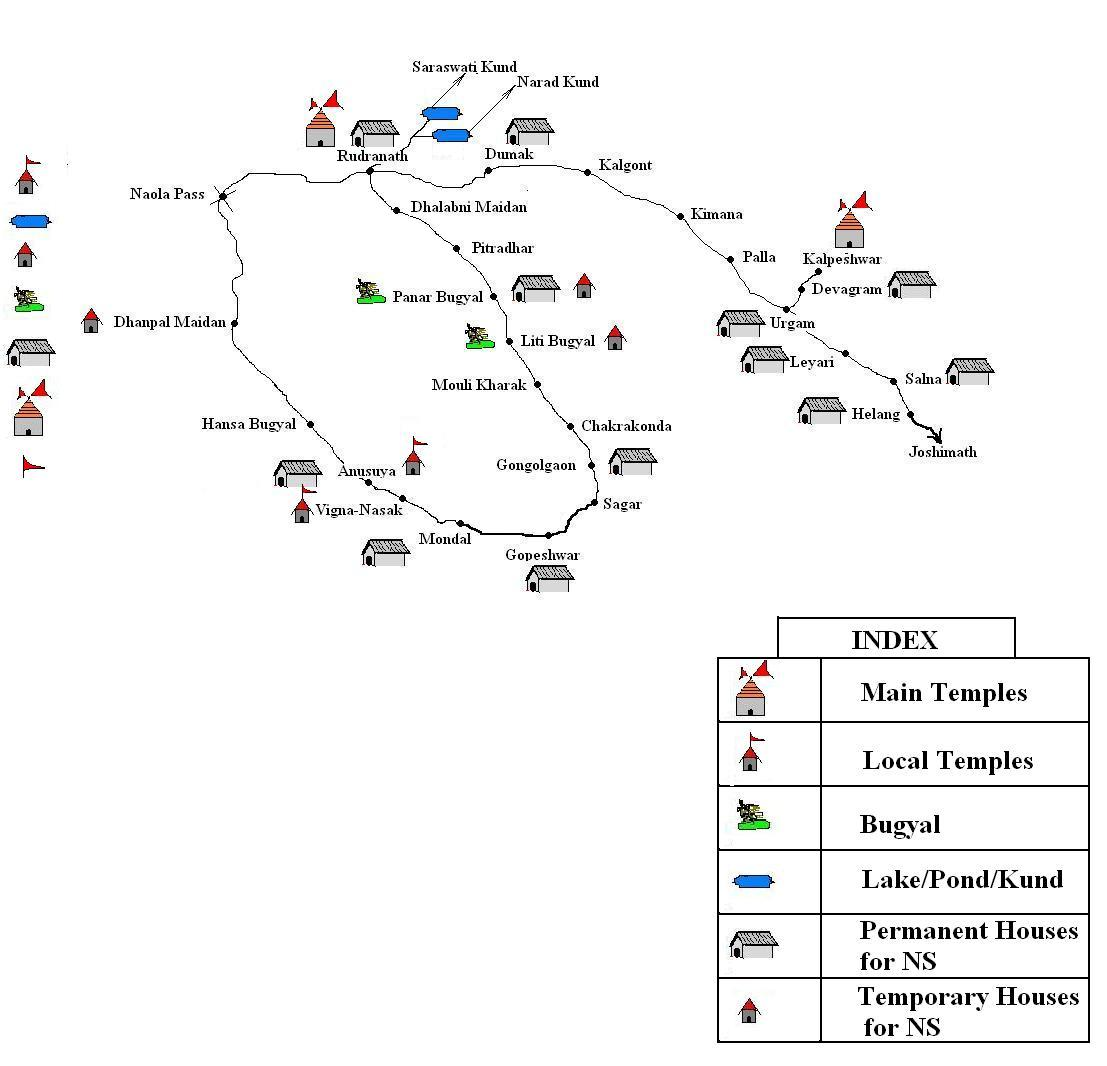
Map of Rudranath

Rudranath is sometimes considered the most difficult Panch Kedar temple to reach.

Most trekking routes to Rudranath are from Gopeshwar or nearby places. A motorable road ends at the village Sagar after which visitor walk through oak and rhododendron forests. Other routes include: an uphill, 17 km (11 mi) trek from Gangolgaon — 3 km (2 mi) from Gopeshwar — through the forest and Panar and Naila shepherd settlements. Another trek route from Gopeshwar to Rudranath passes via Mandal (13 km or 8 mi) and then additional 6 km (4 mi) to the Anusuya Devi Temple and then another 20 km (12 mi) to Rudranath. A 45 km (28 mi) trek path from Joshimath is considered strenuous.

== Notes ==
- Distance from Anusuya Devi to Rudranath is 20 km approximately
- uttaranchal-tourism website
