= Panch Kedar =

Group of five Shiva temples in Uttarakhand, India

Panch Kedar, Kedarnath
- पञ्चकेदार
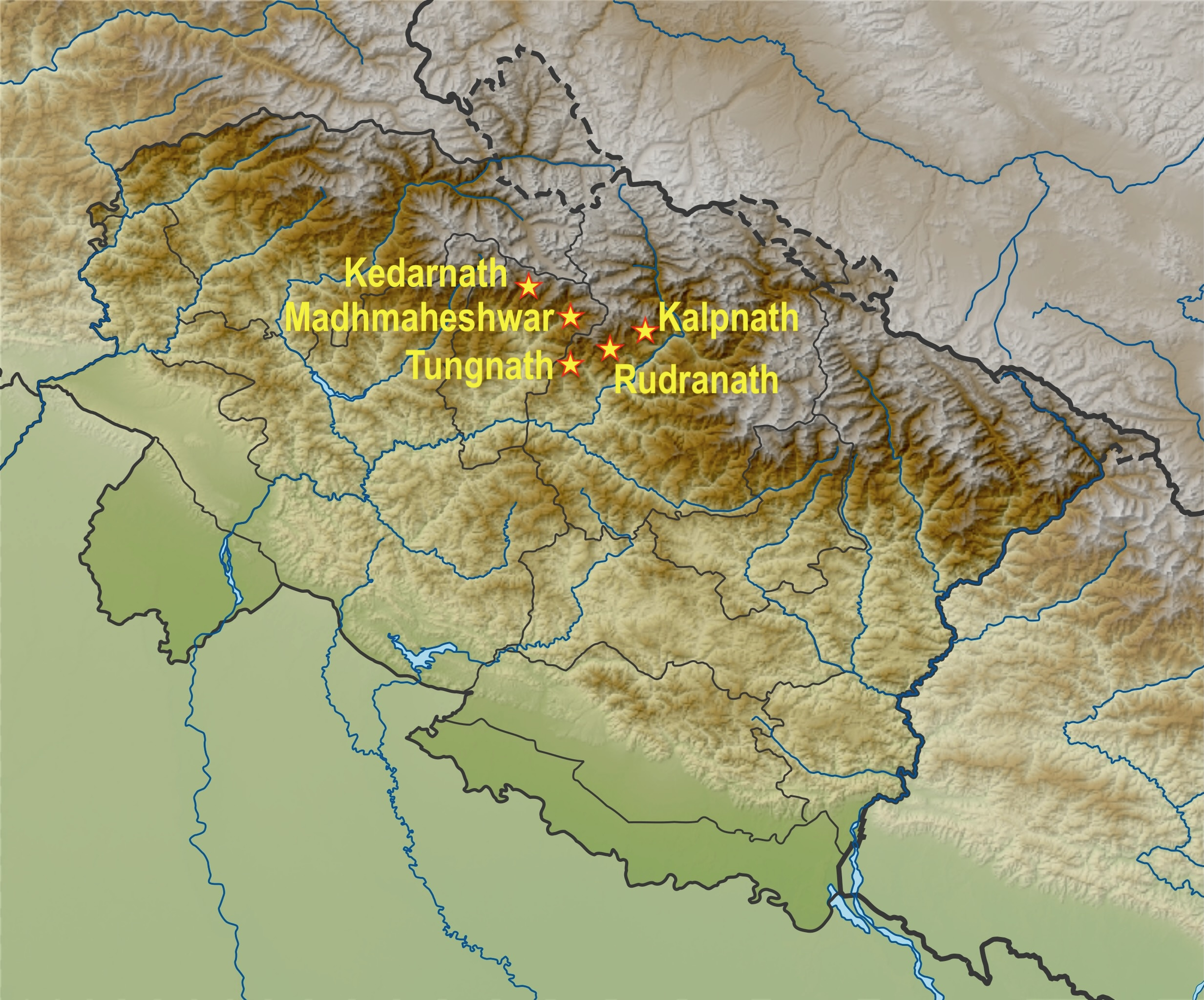

Religion
- Affiliation: Hinduism
- Deity: Shiva

Location
- State: Uttarakhand
- Country: India
- Interactive map of Panch Kedar, Kedarnath
- Coordinates: Kedarnath 30°43′48″N 79°4′12″E, Tungnath 30°29′22″N 79°12′55″E, Rudranath 30°31′10″N 79°19′6″E, Madhyamaheshwar 30°38′13″N 79°12′58″E and Kalpeshwar 30°34′37.35″N 79°25′22.49″E

Architecture
- Type: North Indian architecture
- Creator: Pandavas (Hindu tradition)
- Completed: Unknown

Panch Kedar (Sanskrit: पञ्चकेदार, romanized: Pañcakedāra), rendered Pancha Kedara in Sanskrit, refers to five Hindu temples or holy places of the Shaivite sect dedicated to god Shiva. They are located in the Garhwal Himalayan region in Uttarakhand, India. They are the subject of many legends that directly link their creation to Pandavas, the heroes of the Indianepic Mahabharata.

The five temples designated in the strict pecking order to be followed for pilgrimage worship are the Kedarnath Temple (Sanskrit: केदारनाथ) at an altitude of 3,583 m (11,755 ft), the Tungnath Temple (तुङ्गनाथ) (3,680 m or 12,070 ft), the Rudranath Temple (रुद्रनाथ) (3,559 m or 11,677 ft), the Madhyamaheshwar Temple (मध्यमहेश्वर) or Madmaheshwar (3,490 m or 11,450 ft) and the Kalpeshwar Temple (कल्पेश्वर) (2,200 m or 7,200 ft). The Kedarnath is the main temple and is a part of Chota Char Dham (literally 'the small four abodes/seats') pilgrimage centers of the Garhwal Himalayas. The other three dham are the Badrinath, Yamunotri and Gangotri. Kedarnath is also one of the twelve Jyotirlingas.

The Garhwal region is also called the Kedar-Khanda after Kedar—the local name for Shiva. The region abounds in emblems and aniconic forms of the Shaiva sect of Shiva, much more than those of the Vaishnava sect. The western part of this region in particular, which constitutes half of Chamoli district and is known as Kedar-Kshetra or Kedar Mandala, encompasses all five temples comprising the Panch Kedar.

The number of visitors to the Kedarnath shrine, the first of the Panch Kedar temples for which records are available, was an impressive 1,652,000 in 2024 compared to 87,629 in 1987, a significant increase in 37 years.

== History ==
It is said that the Panch Kedar Yatra (pilgrimage) could be directly related to the Gorakhnath Sampradaya (recognized for their pilgrim traditions) of Nepal. As a proof, it is stated that the culmination of the pilgrimage was at Pashupatinath temple in Nepal, rightly where Shiva's head is worshipped and not at Kedarnath where the hump is venerated. A further supporting fact mentioned in this regard is that the emblem used in the Kedarnath temple dome is the same as displayed in the Pashupathinath temple dome in Kathmandu. The Tungnath and Madhyamaeshwar shrines are replicas of the Kedarnath shrine.

== Legends ==
Many folk legends related to the Garhwal region, Shiva and the creation of the Panch Kedar temples are narrated.

A folk legend about Panch Kedar relates to the Pandavas, the heroes of the Hindu epic Mahabharata. The Pandavas defeated and slayed their cousins — the Kauravas in the epic Kurukshetra War. They wished to atone for the sins of committing fratricide (gotra hatya) and Brāhmanahatya (killing of Brahmins — the priest class) during the war. On the advice of Krishna, they handed over the reins of their kingdom to their kin and left in search of Shiva and to seek his blessings. First, they went to the holy city of Varanasi (Kashi), believed to be Shiva's favourite city and known for its Shiva temple. But, Shiva wanted to avoid them as he was deeply incensed by the death and dishonesty at the Kurukshetra War and was, therefore, insensitive to Pandavas' prayers. Therefore, he assumed the form of a bull (Nandi) and hid in the Garhwal region.

Not finding Shiva in Varanasi, the Pandavas went to Garhwal Himalayas. Bhima, the second of the five Pandava brothers, then standing astride two mountains started to look for Shiva. He saw a bull grazing near Guptakashi (“hidden Kashi” — the name derived from the hiding act of Shiva). Bhima immediately recognized the bull to be Shiva. Bhima caught hold of the bull by its tail and hind legs. But the bull-formed Shiva disappeared into the ground to later reappear in parts, with the hump raising in Kedarnath, the arms appearing in Tungnath, the face showing up at Rudranath, the nabhi (navel) and stomach surfacing in Madhyamaheshwar and the hair appearing in Kalpeshwar. It is believed that Shiva's throat fell on the Kedarkantha mountain. The Pandavas pleased with this reappearance in five different forms, built temples at the five places for venerating and worshipping Shiva. The Pandavas were thus freed from their sins.

A variant of the tale credits Bhima of not only catching the bull, but also stopping it from disappearing. Consequently, the bull was torn asunder into five parts and appeared at five locations in the Kedar Khand (Sanskrit: केदारखण्डः) of Garhwal region of the Himalayas. After building the Panch Kedar Temples, the Pandavas meditated at Kedarnath for salvation, performed yagna (fire sacrifice) and then through the heavenly path called the Mahapanth (also called Swargarohini), attained heaven or salvation.. The Panch Kedar Temples are constructed in the North-Indian Himalayan Temple architecture with the Kedarnath, Tungnath and Madhyamaheshwar temples constructed in a similar manner.

After completing the pilgrimage of Shiva's darshan at the Panch Kedar Temples, it is an unwritten religious rite to visit Vishnu at the Badrinath Temple, as a final affirmatory proof by the devotee that he has sought blessings of Shiva.

Worship rights

The priests are from the Veerashaiva community, except in Tungnath. Jangamas from the Lingayats in Karnataka, are the chief priests at the Kedarnath and Madhyamaheswar temples.The chief priest of Kedarnath is called Rawal and Jagadguru. Dasnami Gosains founded by Adi Shankaracharya are the chief priests in the Rudranath and Kalpeshwar temples. The Tunganath temple is served by the Khasi Brahmins. In the case of Tungnath, it is also said that the local Brahmins from Mokkumath officiate as priests.

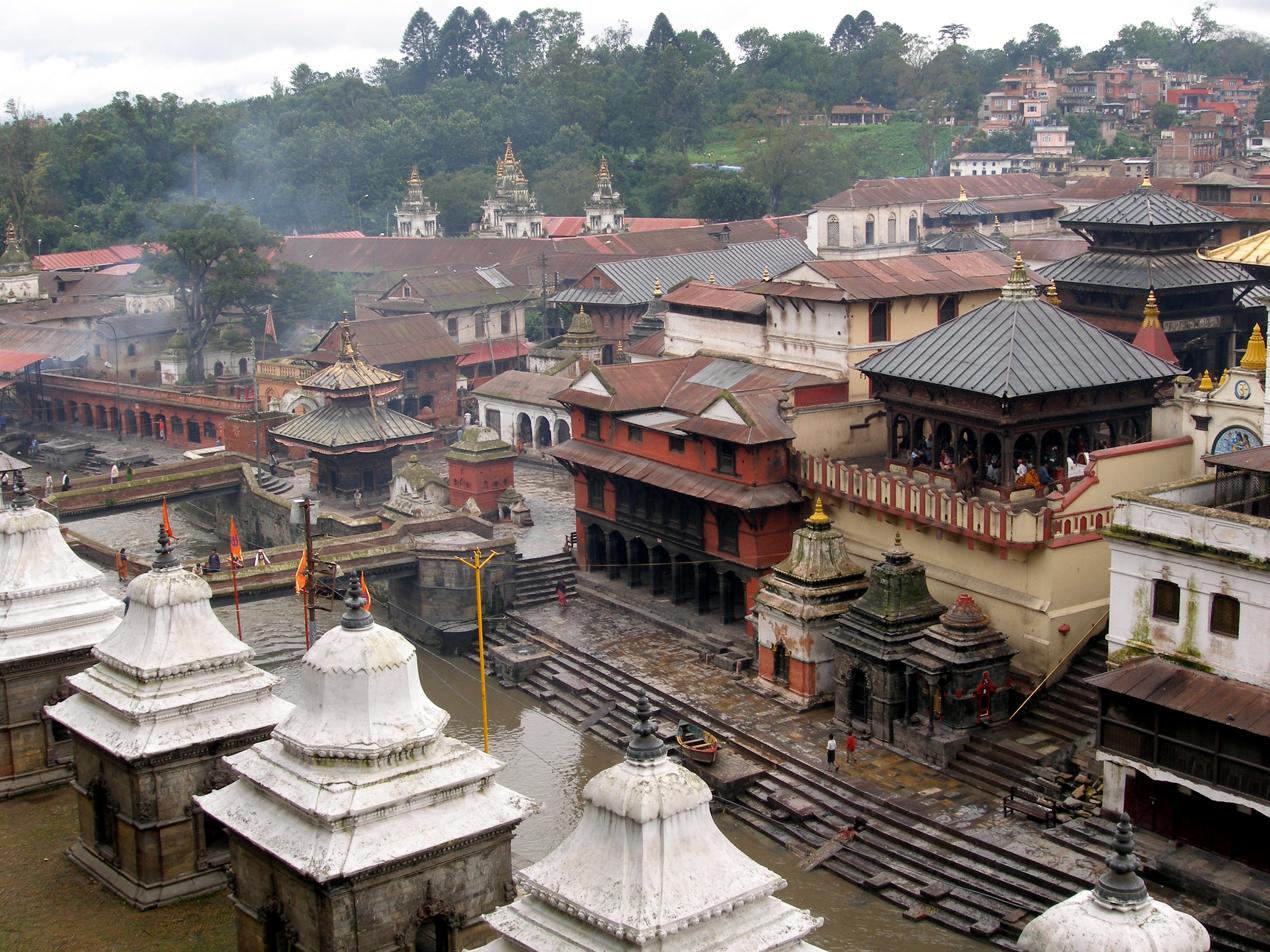
Overview of Pashupatinath temple complex in Kathmandu, Nepal

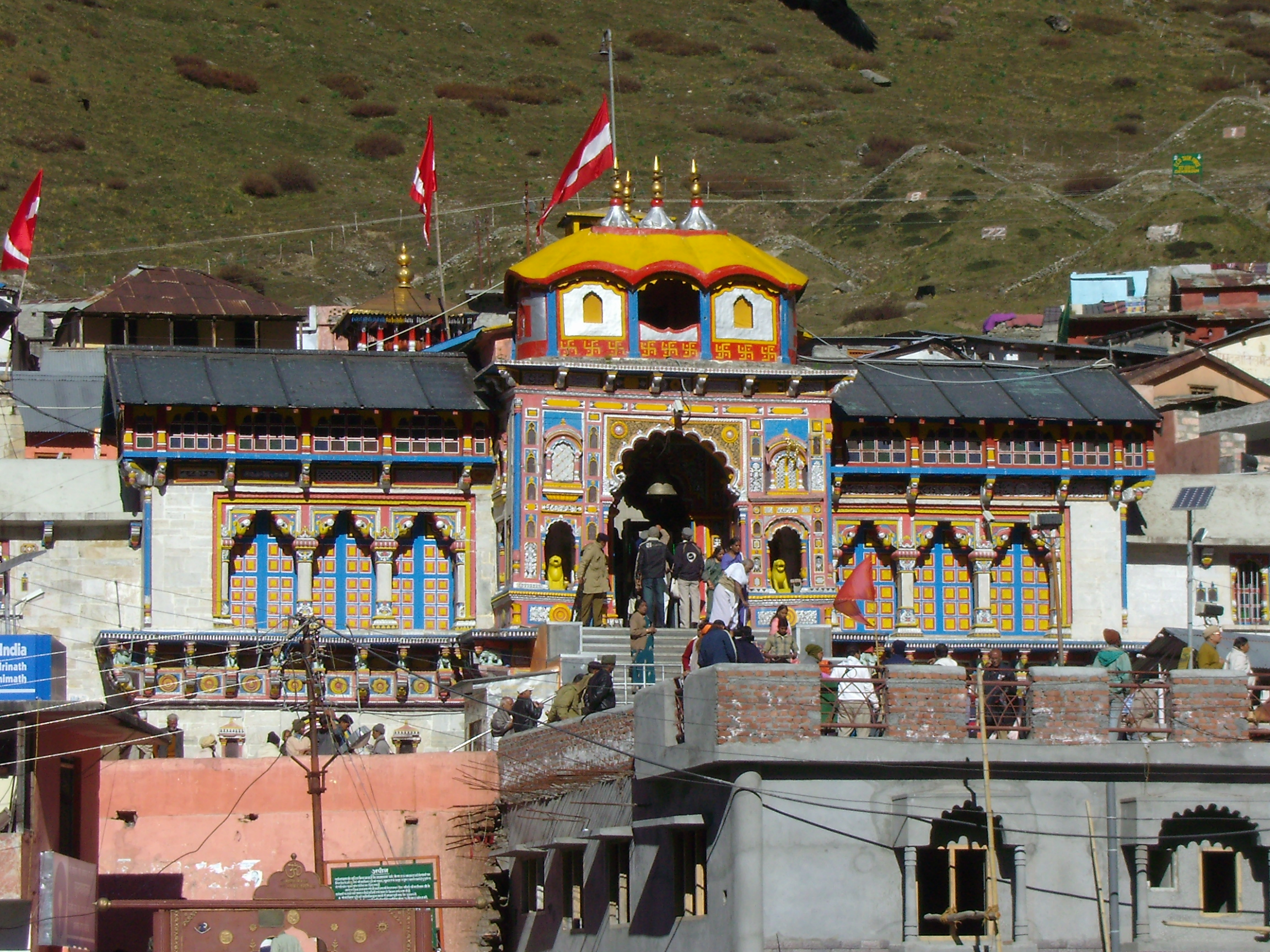
The Badrinath Temple

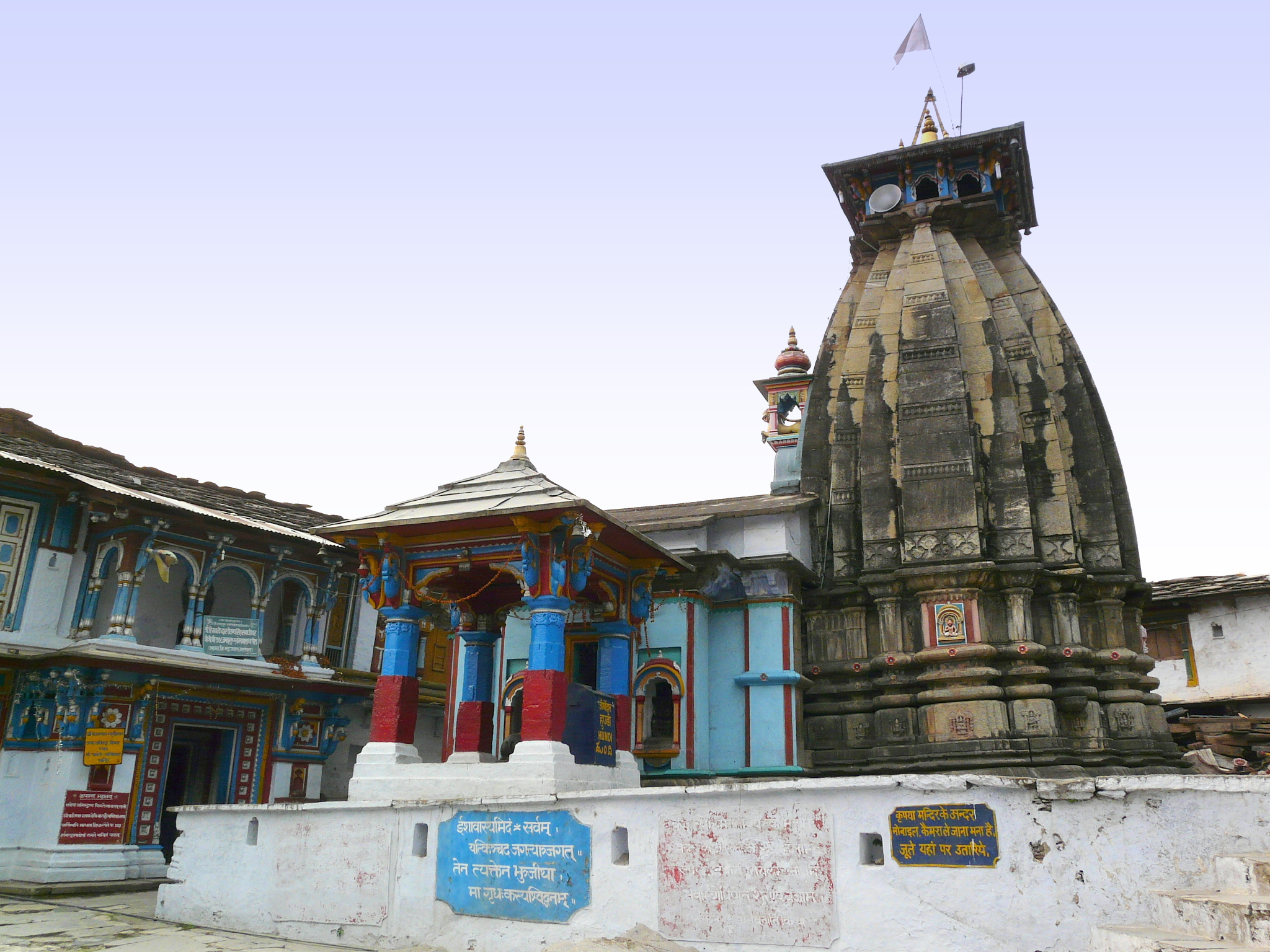
Ukhimath Temple, where the Kedarnath and the Madhyamaheshwar deities are kept during the winter months

== Geography ==
Temple locations

The five temples are located in the Upper Himalayas, set against the backdrop of the snow-covered peaks of Nanda Devi, Chaukhamba, Kedarnath and Neelkanth. Kedarnath is located in the Mandakini River valley, while the remaining shrines are situated in the highlands between the Mandakini valley and the Alaknanda gorge. They are so remote that, except for Kalpeshwar, the other four remain inaccessible by motorable roads and can only be reached via strenuous trekking, usually from late April or early May until early October. During the winter months, the shrines are closed due to heavy snowfall. Kalpeshwar remains accessible year-round via a short trek of about 3 km (2 mi) from the nearest roadhead. (See External links for schematic maps of the locations of Panch Kedar).

The village of Kedarnath is situated on the edge of a mountain slope in the remote northern region of the Garhwal Himalayas. The Kedarnath ranges drain into the Mandakini River, which originates from the steady terminus of the Churabari glacier and flows through the scenic Mandakini Valley. The Dudhganga, Madhuganga, Swargaduari and Saraswathi are the streams that flow through the valley behind the Kedarnath Temple. Near the temple there are four sacred ponds: Retah, Udak, Rudra and Rishi. Tunganath has an impressive backdrop of the peaks of Panchachuli, Nanda Devi, Dunagiri, Kedarnath and Bandar Poonch. The Vaitarani stream flows near Rudranath. Kalpeshwar is located in the Urgam valley in a dense forest area. Urgam Valley has apple orchards, terraced fields where potato is grown extensively. Kalp Ganga river, a tributary of the Alaknanda, flows through the valley.

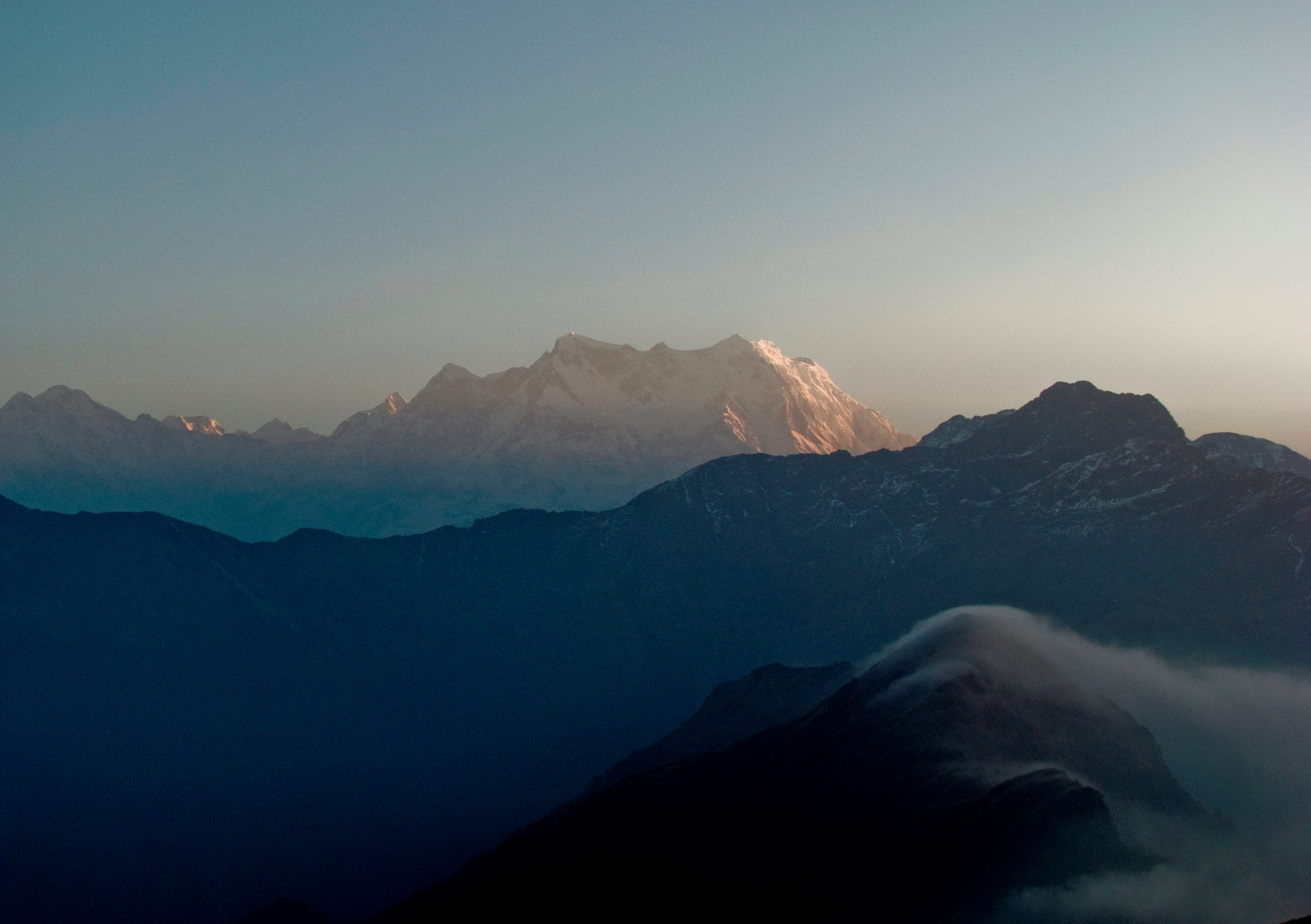
Chaukhamba peak

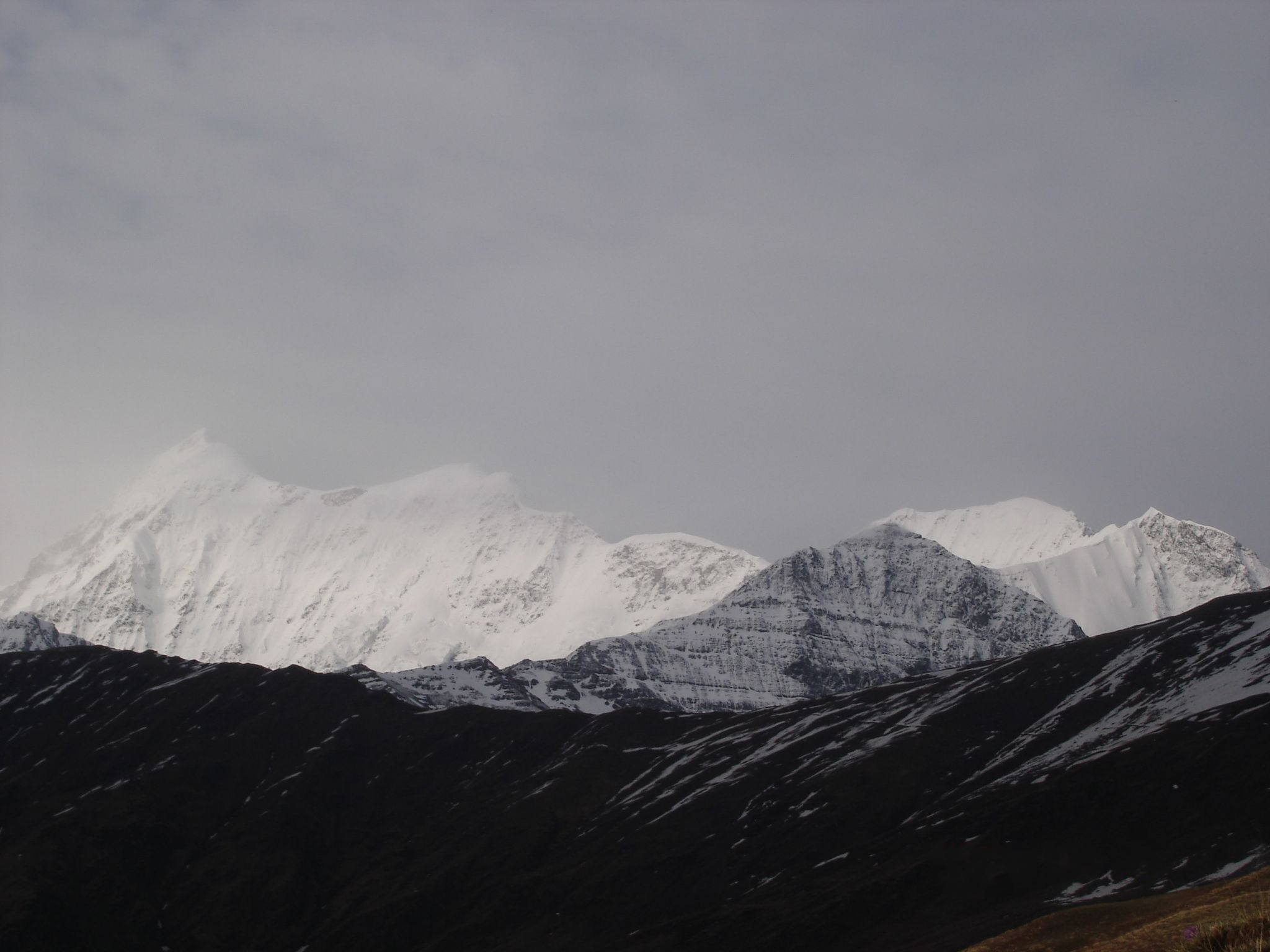
Trishul peak

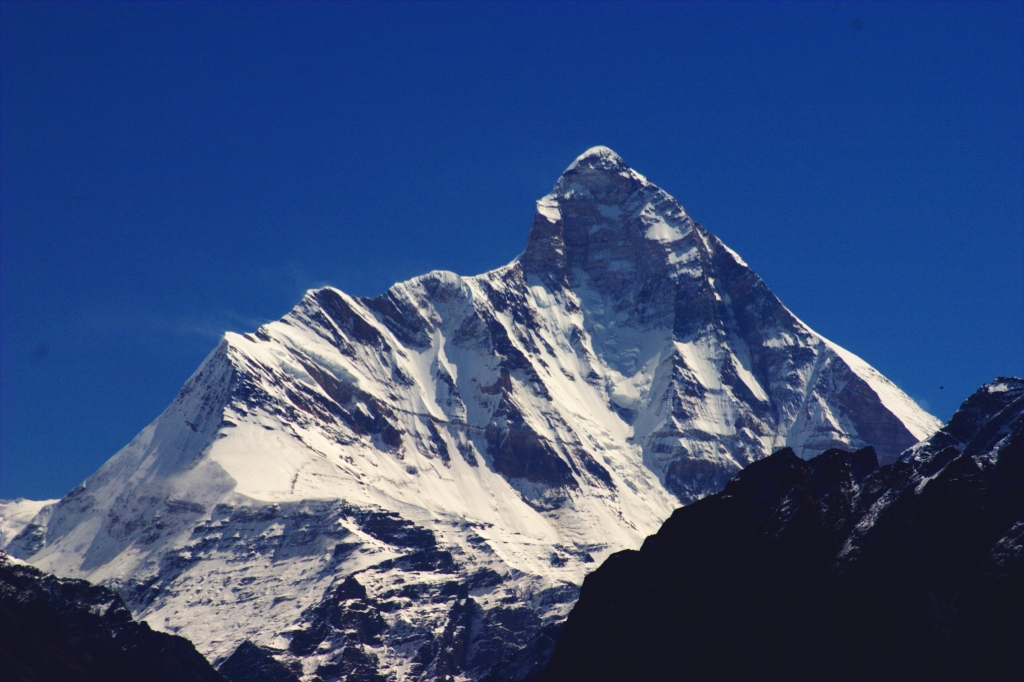
Nanda Devi Peak

== Accessibility ==
Accessing the Panch Kedar circuit by trekking is possible with a single major roadhead, Rishikesh, which is well connected to all the base points by paved roads. Since the five temples are located in different regions, each requires travel to a separate base village, and four of them involve trekking. Kedarnath is reached from Gaurikund with a 16–18 km (9.9–11.2 mi) trek, Madhyamaheshwar from Ransi with 8–10 km (5.0–6.2 mi) trek, Tungnath from Chopta with a 3.5 km (2.2 mi) trek, Rudranath from Sagar with a 18–20 km (11–12 mi) trek, and Kalpeshwar is the only one located near the roadhead and requires only a short walk. The trekking routes in the Garhwal region offer striking views of prominent Himalayan peaks such as Nanda Devi (7,820 m; 25,645 ft), Trishul (7,120 m; 23,360 ft), and Chaukhamba (7,140 m; 23,420 ft). The Garhwal region is also the source of Ganga River and its many tributaries, which enhances the spiritual significance of the Panch Kedar temples.

The total trek length to cover all the five temples of Panch Kedar is about 95–100 km (59–62 mi), involving 10–12 days of effort. The trek starts from Gauri Kund, which has views of the Himalayan range of hills. The trekking is undertaken during two seasons; three months during summer and two months after the monsoon season, as during the rest of the period, except Kalpeshwar, the other four Panch Kedar temples are inaccessible due to snow cover.

The road from Rishikesh is the first entry point to Garhwal from the plains of Uttarakhand. Rishikesh is approachable from Delhi by road over a distance of 230 km (140 mi). The road from Rishikesh leads to the Gaurikund on the Rudraprayag–Kedarnath road from where the trekking would start to Kedarnath temple. The trek to Kedarnath is of 18 km (11 mi), each way. After Kedarnath, road travel to Guptakashi and further to Jagasu covers a distance of 30 km (19 mi). From Jagasu, the trek to Madhaymaheshwar temple via Gaundhar is over a distance of 24 km (15 mi). This trek provides views of the Chaukhamba, the Kedarnath and the Neelkanth peaks. Returning from Madhyamaheshwar the road drive to Chopta via Jagasu is of 45 km (28 mi). From Chopta, the trek is to the Tunganath temple over a distance of about 4 km (2.5 mi). After the Tunganath trek, the drive along the road up to Mandal (known Cherrapunji of Garhwal due to heavy rainfall) is for a distance of 8 km (5.0 mi). From Mandal, the trek to Rudranath temple is of 20 km (12 mi). After visiting Rudranath temple the return journey is to Mandal and the drive down by road to Helang. From Helang, the trek to Kalpeshwar temple is for 11 km (6.8 mi) via Urgam village and is considered strenuous due to the steepness of the route.

After completing the pilgrimage trek of Kalpeswar temple, the last of the Panch Kedar temples, the return road drive from Helong to Riishikesh via Pipalkothi is a distance of 233 km (145 mi). The nearest airport is Jolly Grant, Dehradun (258 km or 160 mi). The nearest railway station is Rishikesh (241 km or 150 mi).

== Worship during winter season ==
During the winter period when the temples are inaccessible due to snowfall, the sanctified symbolic Shiva idol of Kedarnath is worshipped at the Omkareshwar temple at Ukhimath, the representational idol of Tunganath is worshipped at Makkumath, the Rudranath symbolic image is brought to Gopeshwar, and the Madhyamaheshwar symbolic idol is venerated at Ukhimath.

Kalpeshwar is the only temple of the sacred Panch Kedar that remains open throughout the year.

== See also ==
- Panch Prayag
- Chhota Char Dham
