= Guptakashi =

Town in Uttarakhand, India

Guptakashi, Gupta Kashi or Guptkashi is a fairly large town located at an elevation of 1,319 metres (4,327 ft) in the Kedar-khanda ('khanda' means "sector"), in Garhwal Himalayas of Rudraprayag district in Uttarakhand, India. It is known for its ancient Vishwanath Temple dedicated to the god Shiva, which is similar to the one in Varanasi (Kashi). The other well known temple here is dedicated to Ardhanareshvara, a half man half woman form of Shiva and Parvati. The name Guptakashi has legendary significance linked to the Pandavas, the heroes of the Hindu epic Mahabharata. Its religious importance is considered next to that of Varanasi, believed to be the most pious of all Hindu pilgrimage sites.

The temple town is located on the way to the Kedarnath, one of the Chota Char Dhams and Panch Kedars. It has the scenic backdrop of the snow-covered peaks of Chaukhamba and enjoys a salubrious weather throughout the year.

== Legend ==
Popularly-narrated legend holds that subsequent to the Kurukshetra War of the epic Mahabharata, the Pandavas on the advice of god Krishna and other sages wished to atone for their sins of fratricide and Brāhmanahatya committed by them during the war by seeking pardon from Shiva and also pray for his blessings before attaining salvation. But Shiva was not willing to meet them since he was annoyed with them for the unjust events of the war. He, therefore, avoided meeting them at Kashi and went incognito as the bull Nandi to Guptakashi in Uttarakhand. But Pandavas pursued him to Guptakashi and recognized him in the disguised form of Nandi. When Bhima, the second Pandava brother tried to hold the bull by its tail and hind legs, Nandi vanished from Guptakashi, into the ground (into a cave for hiding), but reappeared later as Shiva in five different forms namely, hump at Kedarnath, face at Rudranath, arms at Tungnath, navel and stomach at Madhyamaheshwar and the locks at Kalpeshwar. The vanishing act of Shiva gave the name Guptakashi (hidden Kashi) to this place on the bank of the Mandakini River. In the upper reaches of the Bhagirathi River, there is another Kashi, called the Uttarkashi (North Kashi).

Mythology also states that Shiva proposed to Parvati at Guptakashi before they got married in the small Triyuginarayan village at the confluence of Mandakini and Sone-Ganga rivers. However the old route of 14 km from Gauri Kund to Kedarnath via Rambara was completely washed away in the 2013 North India floods, and new route of 15–16 km was made by the Nehru Institute of Mountaineering. The distance of Guptakashi to Kedarnath remains at 22 kilometers and 729.77 meters, which is most important to the celestial nuptials.

According to Puranic literature, Kashi and Kanchi (Kanchipuram) are considered as two eyes of Shiva. Keeping this connotation in view, six more "Kashi"s have been prescribed to be as sacred and spiritual as the main Kashi - Varanasi. Pilgrims, who cannot undertake the long journey to the main Kashi, can travel to the closest Kashi. The six other "Kashi"s cover all the regions of the country. These are: Uttarkashi and Guptakashi in Uttarakhand in Northern Himalayas, Dakshinkashi in Southern India, the Guptakashi in Eastern India is at Bhubaneswar, the Kashi at Nashik (also Paithan) in Western India and a Kashi in Mandi in Himachal Pradesh in Western Himalayas. The Puranas state that all the Kashis have the same degree of sanctity and reverence as the main Kashi - Varanasi.

Another legend declares that when the Mughal emperor Aurangzeb demolished the Kashi Vishwanath Temple in 1669, and constructed Gaynvapi Mosque (he had even renamed Varanasi as Mohammadâbâd), the Shiva Linga was shifted to Guptakashi for safe keeping. But the original linga of Kashi Vishwanath is stated to have remained here from the time it was shifted.

== Structures ==
The main temple is dedicated to Shiva as Vishwanath (ruler of the world). The architectural style of this temple is akin to other temples in Uttarakhand, such as Kedarnath, built in stone with a high tower over the sanctum and a wooden frame and sloping roof in typical architectural style of the region, at the top of the tower. At the entrance to the temple, there are two dwarpalakas (entrance guards) on both sides. The exterior façade is painted with lotuses. At the top of the entrance door, there is an image of Bhairava, a terrible form of Shiva. To the left of the main shrine, there is a smaller shrine dedicated to Ardhanareeshvara and at the entrance to this temple there is metallic statue of Nandi facing Shiva's image in the temple and offering reverential worship. This statue has a Swastika, a typical Hindu symbol, painted on its side, with its arms aligned in a clockwise direction, considered as an auspicious direction.

Apart from the main Vishwanath temple, a large number of Lingas, symbols of Shiva, are seen in and around Guptakashi, which has resulted in the popular terminology jitne pathar utne shankar meaning "as many stones, those many 'Shiva's". Another temple town called the Ukhimath is located on the opposite bank of the Mandakini river where, during the winter months when Kedarnath temple is inaccessible due to snowy conditions, the symbolic deity of Kedarnath is shifted via Gaurikund, Phata, Guptakashi to Ukhimath to continue worship uninterrupted. The temple priests of Kedarnath stay at Guptakashi during the winter period.

In a small pond (kund) called the Manikarnika Kund here, in front of the temple, a Shiva-linga is bathed by two springs, representing the rivers Ganges (Bhagirathi) and Yamuna. The Yamuna spring water emanates from a goumukh (spout in the shape of a cow's mouth) and the Bhagirathi spring flows through trunk of an elephant strategically placed above the linga.

In addition, there are few other important sites to visit in the vicinity of the temple town. These are the Gandhi Sarovar (lake) 2 kilometres (1.2 mi) from the town where the ashes of Mahatma Gandhi were immersed. Vasukital, 8 kilometres (5.0 mi) from Kedarnath, is yet another enchanting lake that beholds the visitor with floating ice and sparkling water.

At Ukhimath, on the opposite bank of the river, there is a stupa, which according to the local version represents the grave of Nala. There are also evidences of a love legend narrated, locally only, of Krishna’s grandson Aniruddha and demon king Banasura’s daughter Usha at Ramgarh (in Ronitpur), near Ukhimath, about3 kilometres (1.9 mi) away from Guptakashi. This love affair led to a war between Krishna and Banasura in which the latter was killed, resulting in the end of Banasura's dynasty.

== Geography ==
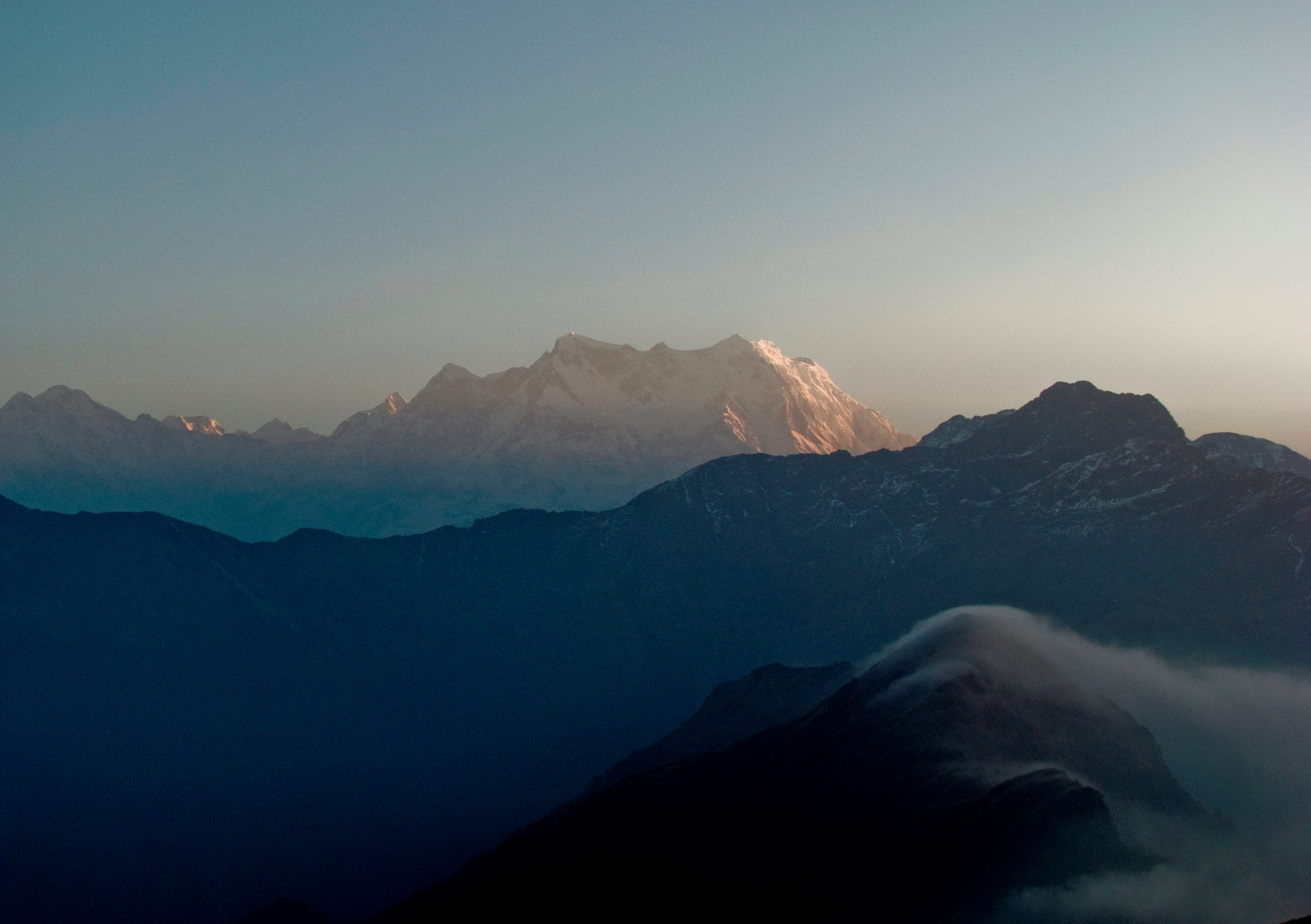
Scenic backdrop of Chaukhamba range of hills at Guptakashi

Guptakashi is located in the Northern Himalayan belt within the Mandakini river valley, which has lush green forests. A number of streams and rivulets drain into the main Mandakini River. It has salubrious climate with its elevation being around 1,319 metres (4,327 ft). The snow sparkling view of the Chaukhamba peak is a lovely sight to behold in the morning hours from here. The valley has large magnolia trees (locally called Champa) that provide a sweet scented atmosphere to the place. The temple of Madhyamaheshwar is 25 kilometres (16 mi) northeast of Guptkashi. The road from Guptkashi to Kalimath and the trek from Kalimath to Madhmaheshwar provide the scenic beauty of Chaukhamba, Kedarnath and Neelkanth peaks.

== Access ==
It is approachable from Rudraprayag by road over a distance of 24 miles (39 km). Rudrprayag is approached from Haridwar or Rishikesh by the National Highway, which goes to Badrinath and beyond. It is 178 kilometres (111 mi) from Rishikesh.
