= Kedarnath Wildlife Sanctuary =

Wildlife sanctuary in Uttarakhand, India

- IUCN category IV (habitat/species management area)
- Location within Uttarakhand Location within India
- Interactive map of Kedarnath Wildlife Sanctuary
- Location: Chamoli Garhwal & Rudraprayag, Uttarkhand, India
- Nearest city: Srinagar, Uttarakhand
- Coordinates: 30°36′00″N 79°12′00″E
- Area: 975 km^{2} (376 sq mi)
- Elevation: 1,160 m (3,810 ft)
- Established: 1972

Kedarnath Wild Life Sanctuary, also called the Kedarnath Musk Deer Sanctuary, is a wildlife sanctuary declared under Wildlife Protection Act, 1972 and located in Uttarakhand, India. Its alternate name comes from its primary purpose of protecting the endangered Himalayan musk deer. Consisting of an area of 975 km^{2} (376 mi^{2}), it is the largest protected area in the western Himalayas.It is famous for alpine musk deer, Himalayan Thar, Himalayan Griffon, Himalayan Black bear, Snow Leopard and other flora park and fauna. It is internationally important for the diversity of its flora and fauna (particularly of ungulate species).

Located in the Himalayan Highlands with an elevation ranging from 1,160 metres (3,810 ft) (near Phata) to the Chaukhamba peak at 7,068 m (23,189 ft), it was a notified reserve forest between 1916 and 1920. It was changed to a sanctuary on 21 January 1972, and has been designated a "Habitat/Species Management Area" by the IUCN.

The sanctuary straddles a geographically diverse landscape and transitional environment. IUCN has reported that "From 44.4% to 48.8% of the sanctuary is forested, 7.7% comprises alpine meadows and scrub, 42.1% is rocky or under permanent snow and 1.5% represents formerly forested areas that have been degraded."

The sanctuary takes its name from the famous Hindu temple of Kedarnath which is just outside its northern border. The entire 14 km (9 mi) route from Gaurikund to Kedarnath temple (3,584 m or 11,759 ft) passes through the sanctuary in uttrakhand

== Geography ==
The sanctuary is geographically situated in the Chamoli and Rudraprayag districts of Uttarakhand. It lies within the larger Western Himalayan alpine shrub and meadows of alpine ecoregion of India, Nepal and Tibet, At higher altitudes, the sanctuary is characterised by glaciers that have created deep V-shaped valleys over centuries. Generally in the north-south direction river valleys are formed by the Mandakini, Kali, Biera, Balasuti and Menan rivers flowing through the sanctuary. The geological formation in the catchment is made up of "Central Crystallines" that are metamorphic rocks such as gneisses, granites and schists. Lakes, waterfall and high-rise mountain peaks abound in this forest belt, as do a number of old Hindu pilgrimage sites - Madhyamaheshwar, Tungnath, Rudranath, Kedarnath, Triyuginarayan and Kalpeshwar all are located within or on the periphery of the sanctuary.

== Religious and social aspect ==
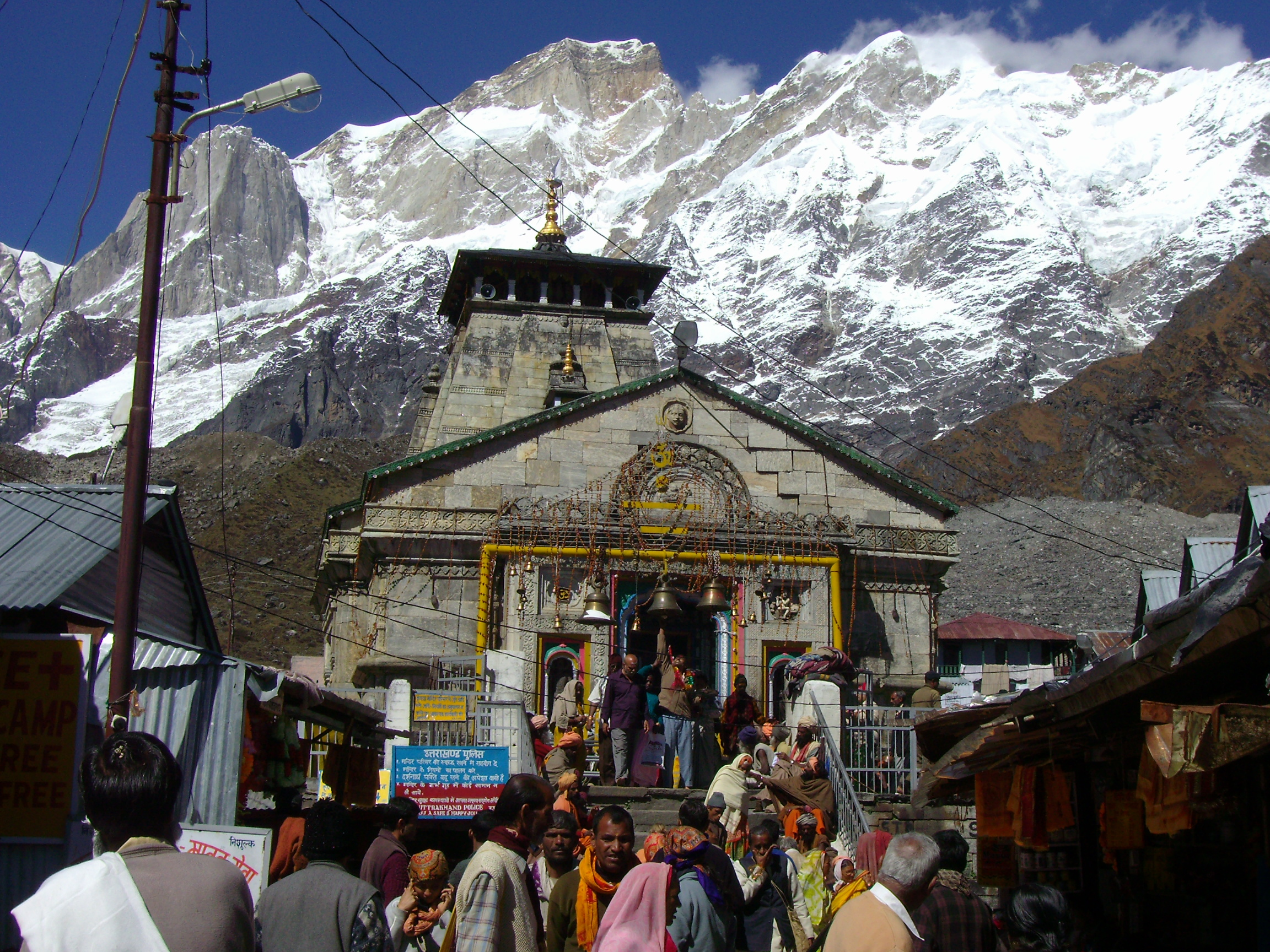
Kedarnath temple gives its name to the sanctuary as it is located amidst the temple precincts

The sanctuary has a large number of Hindu temples located within its precincts. Kedarnath temple is the most historic of these and is visited by a very large number of pilgrims. This temple dates to the 8th century. Other temples, though not of matching importance, have strong legends related to the epic Mahabharata days. These are the Mandani, Madhyamaheshwar, Tungnath, Ansuya Devi and Rudranath. The local Hindu culture is also imbibed by the Bhotiyas (may be with some Tibetan link) who have pastoral work culture and are an integral part of the valleys. Visitors to these temples have occasionally been attacked by wildlife.

== Climate ==
A typical temperate to sub-arctic climate prevails in the locale of the sanctuary. The South West summer monsoon rains recorded is the mean annual precipitation of 3,093 mm (122 in). This high value of precipitation is due to the fact that the hill ranges to the south, of about 3,000 m (9,800 ft) height, are open without much of rain-shadow effect. On the basis of rainfall of 3,050 mm (120 in) recorded near Tungnath in 1979-81, the monsoon rain (June to September) was about 81% while snow precipitation during December–March was 11%. Summer temperature recorded is 25 °C (77 °F), the highest in May or June; a mild and pleasant condition. The lowest winter temperature recorded in the first half of January is −10 °C (14 °F), when heavy snowfall is received in the upper region. This results in severe cold conditions. For about three months, following heavy snowfall in December, the sanctuary is snow-covered.

== Flora ==
The sanctuary is reputed to be one of the world's richest bio-reserves. It is host to temperate forests in the middle altitudes; higher elevations are dotted by coniferous, sub-alpine and alpine forests, and further up by alpine grasslands and high-altitude bugyals. The diverse climate and topography in the sanctuary area has created dense forests of chir pine, oak, birch, rhododendrons and alpine meadows with incidence of numerous Himalayan flowering plants. At Tungnath, two sedges, Carex lacta and C. munda, have been reported which had previously only been reported in the far west region of Nepal. The sanctuary is reputed to have many high value medicinal and aromatic plant species, of which 22 species are rare and endangered. Aconitum balfourii, Angelica glauca, Arnebia benthamii, Artemisia maritima, Bergenia stracheyi, and Dactylorhiza hatagirea are among the threatened medicinal plant species of the sanctuary.

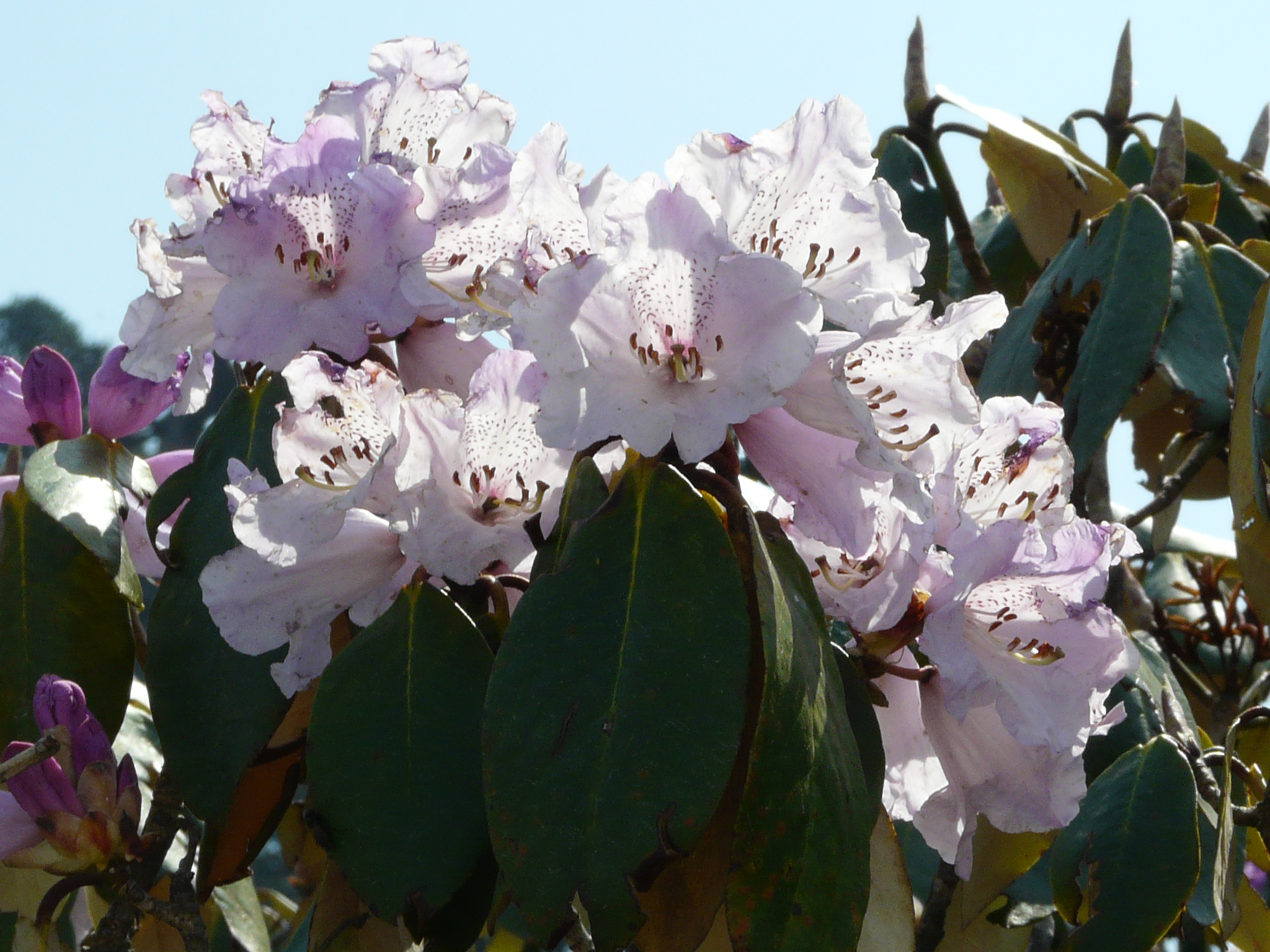
Rhododendrons(Ericaceae)

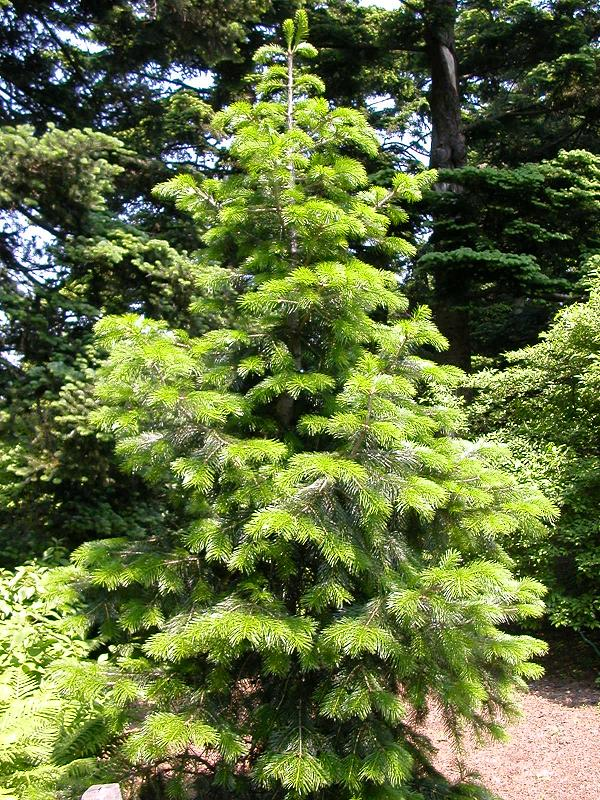
pindrow fir (Also known as West Himalayan Fir)

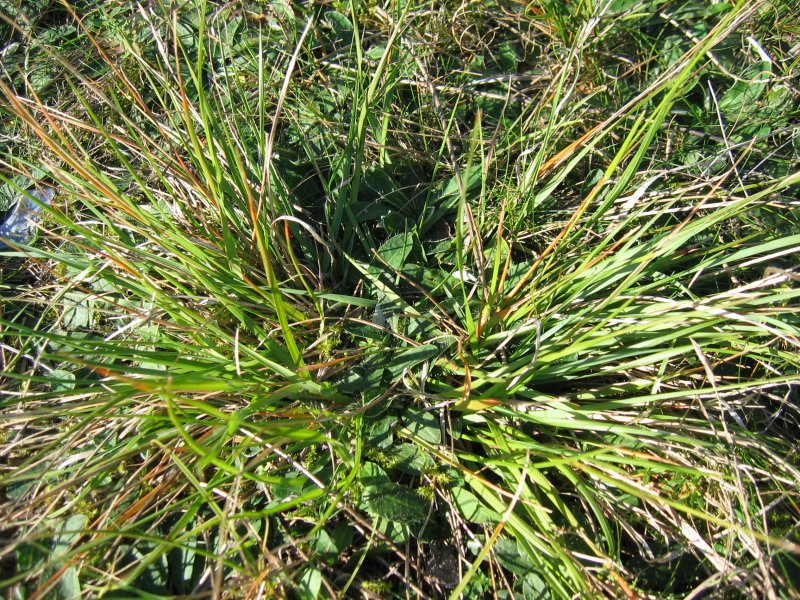
Danthonia decumbens

== Fauna ==
The sanctuary is rich in faunal, avifaunal and aquafaunal species (some are pictured in the gallery).

=== Mammals ===
- Carnivores are: Indian jackal (Canis aureus indicus), red fox (Vulpes vulpes), Himalayan black bear (Selenarctos thibetanus laniger) (V), yellow-throated marten (Martes flavigula), leopard cat (Felis bengalensis), Indian leopard (Panthera pardus fusca) (V) and snow leopard (Uncia uncia). In June 2019, a tiger was also captured on camera in this sanctuary.
- Ungulates are Indian boar (Sus scrofa cristatus), Himalayan musk deer (Moschus leucogaster), and Indian muntjac. The primates recorded are rhesus macaque (Macaca mulatta) and common langur (Presbytis entellus). Among the smaller mammals are Hodgsons's brown-toothed shrew (Episoriculus caudatus), red giant flying squirrel (Petaurista petaurista), and Royle's pika (Ochotona roylei).

=== Birds ===
Important bird species reported are Himalayan monal (Lophophorus impejanus) (the state bird of Uttarakhand), Snow Partridge (Lerwa lerwa), kalij pheasant (lophura leucomelanos hamiltonii), koklass pheasant (Pucrasia macrolopha), West Himalayan bush warbler (Locustella kashmirensis), little pied flycatcher (Ficedula westermanni), grey-cheeked warbler (Seicercus poliogenys) and Rusty-flanked treecreeper (Certhia nipalensis).

=== Reptiles ===
Recorded reptile species are Himalayan pit viper (Gloydius himalayanus syn. Ancistrodon himalayanus) (common) and Boulenger's keelback (Hebius parallelum).

=== Fish ===
In the Mandakini river, fishes recorded include Schizothorax sp., mahseer (Tor tor, Labeo spp., Garra spp., Barilius spp., a new species of Nemacheilus, Glyptothorax spp. and Balitora brucei.

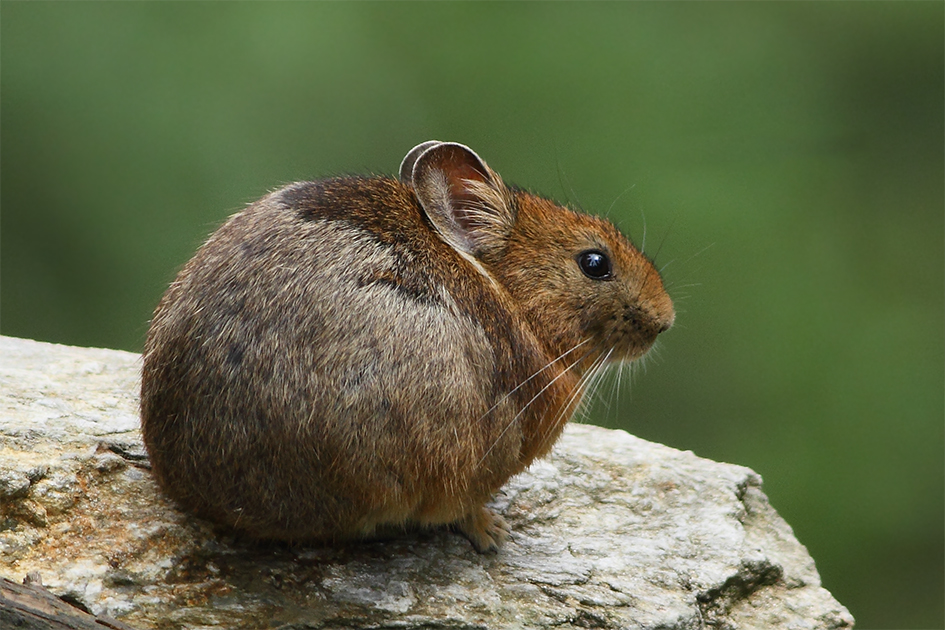
Royle's pika(Ochotona roylei)

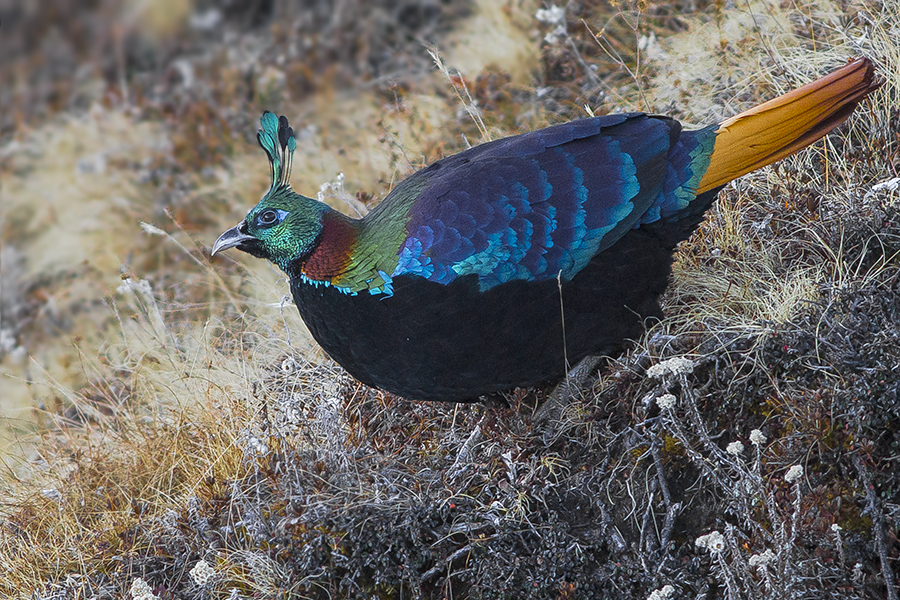
Himalayan monal(Lophophorus impejanus ♂)

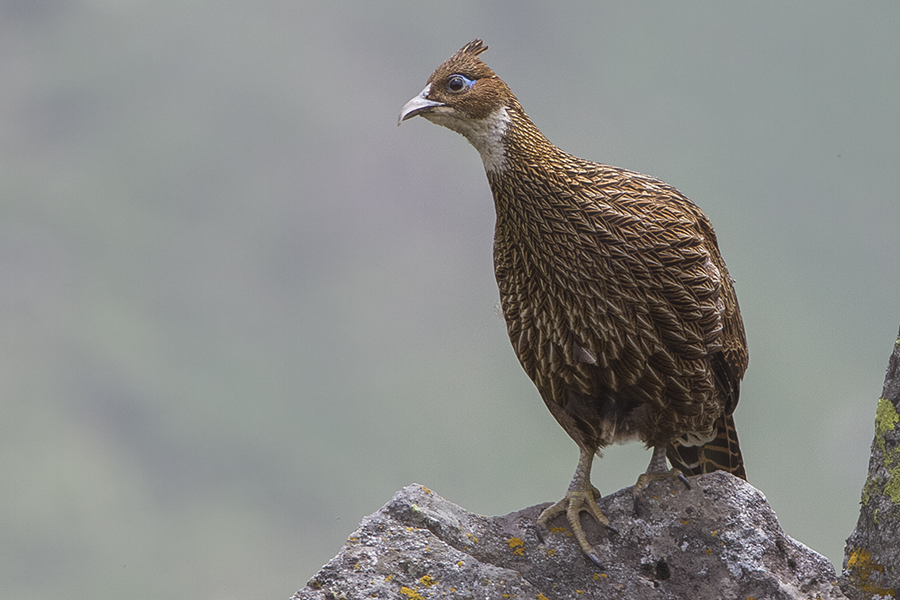
Himalayan monal(Lophophorus impejanus ♀)

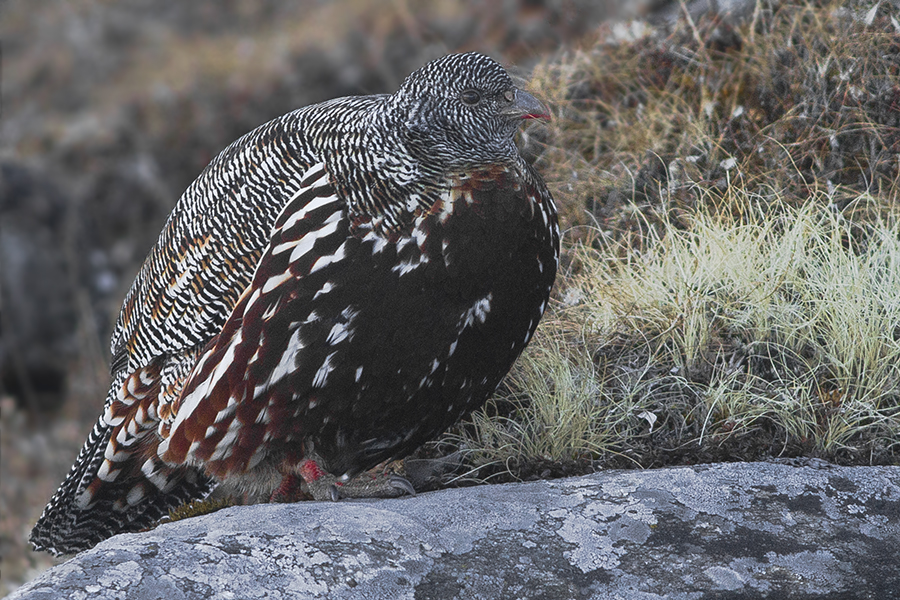
Snow partridge(Lerwa lerwa)

== Conservation ==
Among the more notable of the animals in the region is the animal for which it is alternatively named; the musk deer. Declining population (over 40% in 21 years) of this species and large scale poaching for profit, dictated the decision to declare it as an endangered animal (EN) in 1973 (Halloway, 1973) and the species was listed vulnerable in the red data book of IUCN in 1974. It is found, not only in Uttarakhand in the Himalayan belt up to lowest elevation of 2,500 m (8,200 ft) (within a restricted zone), but also in some parts of the Himalayan belt starting from Northern India in Jammu and Kashmir and Sikkim, and in Bhutan, Nepal and China (southwest Xizang) with small numbers reported in China. These deer dwell generally live alone at a density of 3-4 animals per square kilometer in meadows, fell-fields, shrublands or first forests.

The male species of the endangered musk deer in the Kedarnath Wildlife Sanctuary carries the much valued pods musk pod (glands). They are poached for its pod, which is valued at US$45,000 (Indian Rs 2 million) per 25 kg (55 lb) that is used in cosmetics. It has reportedly pharmaceutical properties also. Its meat is also consumed as a delicacy. The animal is protected under the "Threatened Deer Programme" of the IUCN, with cooperation by the Government of India and World Wide Fund for Nature . The sanctuary includes a breeding center at Kharchula Kharak, both to help advance understanding of the animal's conservation requirements and to breed it in captivity for reintroduction to the wild. Through 1987, it had successfully reared nine deer.

Other scientific activities centered around the sanctuary have been: the high-altitude botanical field station established at Tungnath (3,500 m or 11,500 ft) by the Garhwal University; further ecological studies of the ungulates; WWF on ecology of the Himalayan musk deer and other ungulates near Tungnath, together with surveys of the mammalian fauna and avifauna; and fish fauna studies in the Mandakini River.

== Management of sanctuary ==
The management of the wildlife sanctuary is done by the Uttarakhand Forest department. The Divisional Forest Officer(DFO) Kedarnath Wildlife Division is responsible for scientific management of the wildlife sanctuary as per the approved management plan. The headquarter of Kedarnath Wildlife Division is located at Gopeshwar, District Chamoli. The permission of trekking, camping or conducting scientific study inside the sanctuary is provided by DFO Kedarnath. Wildlife Division. The management of the wildlife sanctuary focuses mainly on wildlife habitat improvement, grazing regulation, forest protection and conservation.

== Visitor information ==
Visitors are mostly Indian nationals on pilgrimage to various temples, though a few international tourists also visit the area. The approach to Kedarnath Temple is only through the sanctuary. Visiting season is from April to June and again from September to November. The number of visitors to the Kedarnath shrine, who passed through the sanctuary, was 5,57,923 in 2007 as against 87,629 in 1987, a quantum jump in 20 years.

The nearest airport is at Jolly Grant Airport at Dehradun at a distance of 227 km (141 mi) from Chopta, the entry point to the sanctuary. Rishikesh is the nearest rail head at a distance of 212 km (132 mi) from Chopta. National Highway NH 58 from Delhi passes through Chamoli via Meerut, Muzaffarnagar, Roorkee, Haridwar, Rishikesh, Devprayag, Srinagar, Rudraprayag, Okhimath; and by state highway to Chopta.

The sanctuary and surroundings offer some housing for visitors, including the forest hut at Madhyamaheshwar for which prior reservation needs to be done through the DFO, Kedarnath Wildlife Division, Gopeshwar. The Temple Committee maintains Dharamshalas (rest houses or inns) for use by pilgrims and tourists at Trijuginarayan, Dougalbitta, Mandal, Gaurikund and Kedarnath. There is also a guest house at Sonprayag.

=== Sanctuary landscape ===
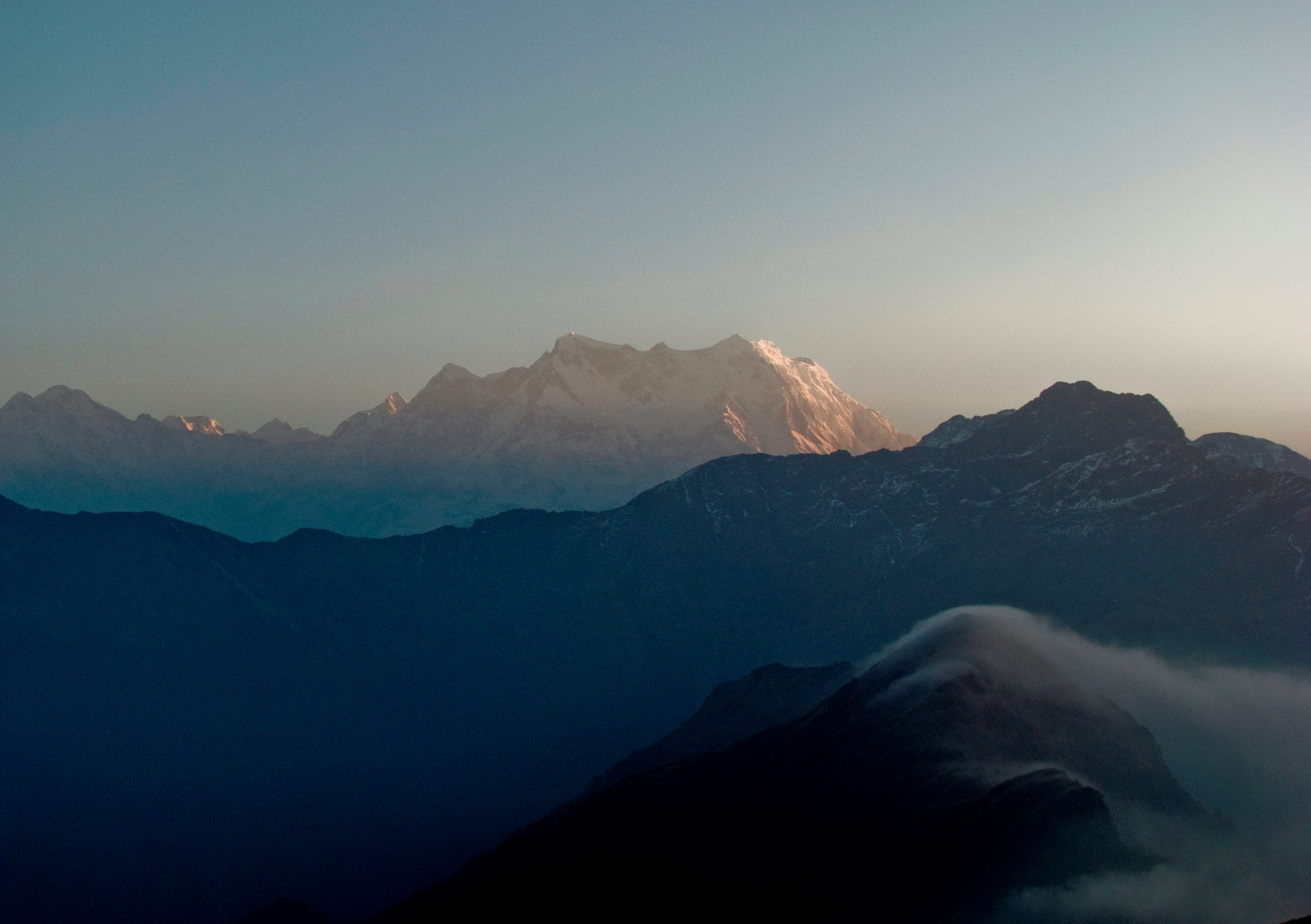
Chaukhamba peak, northern boundary of sanctuary

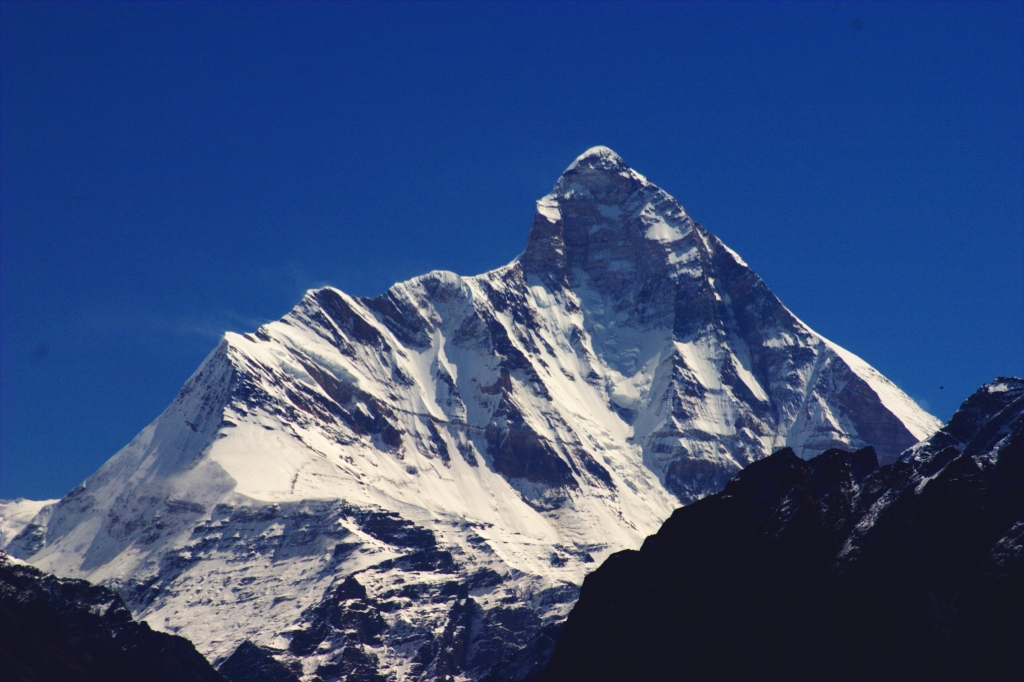
Nanda Devi in reserve forests precincts

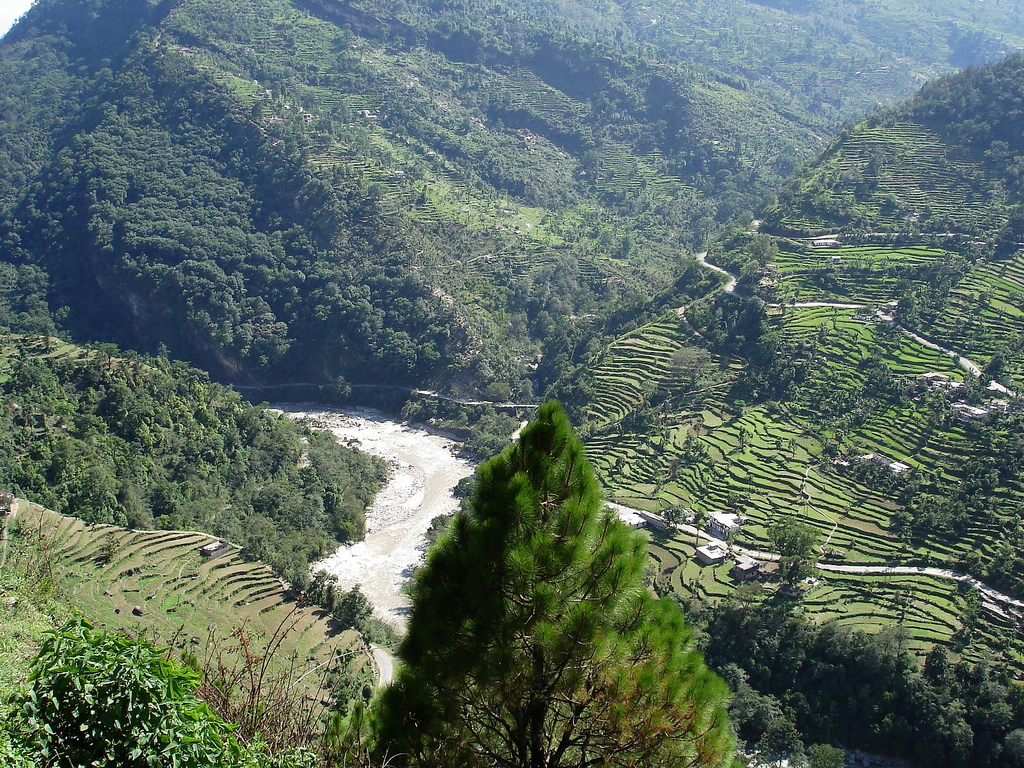
Sanctuary entry from Chopta
