= Rudraprayag district =

- District of Uttarakhand
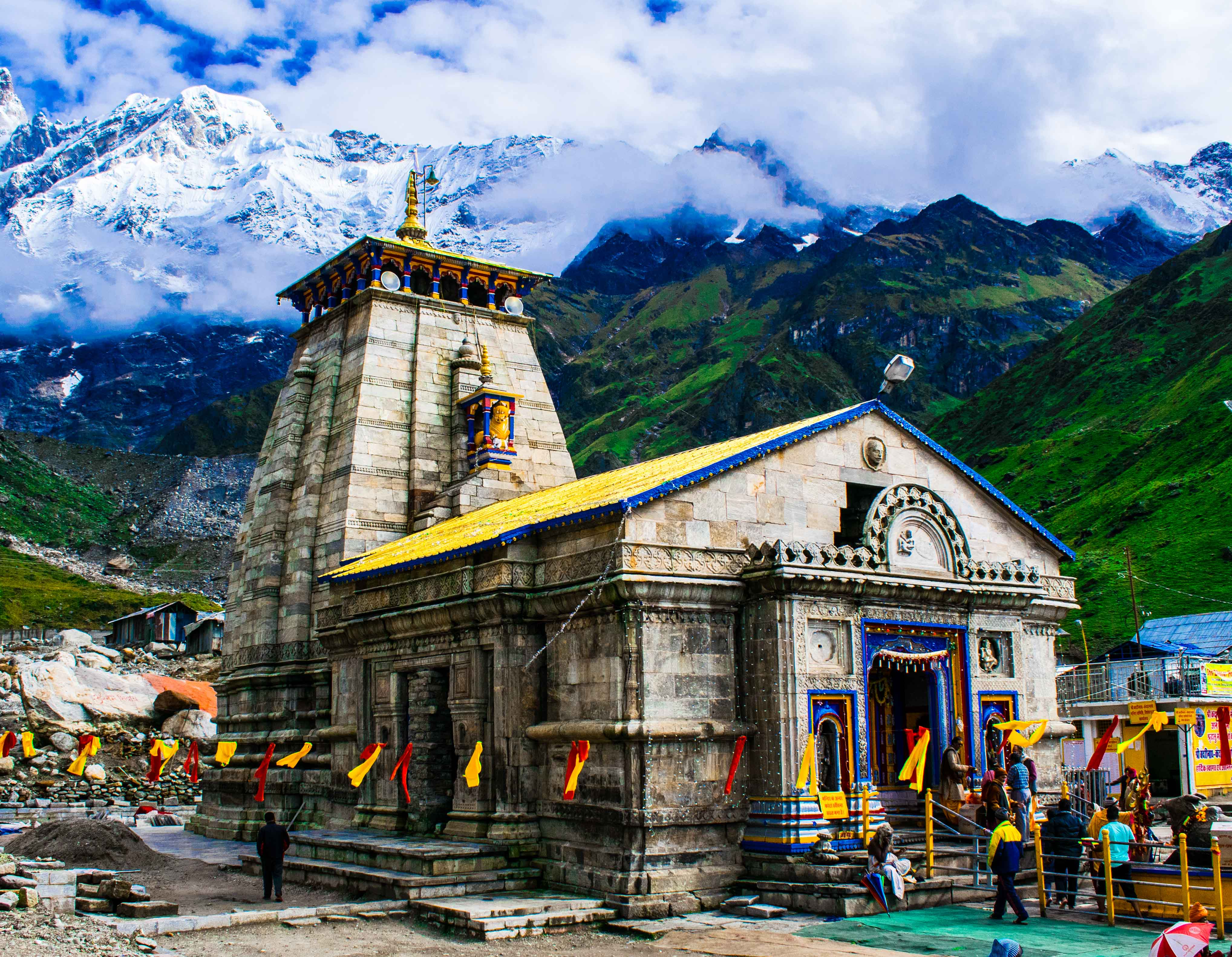
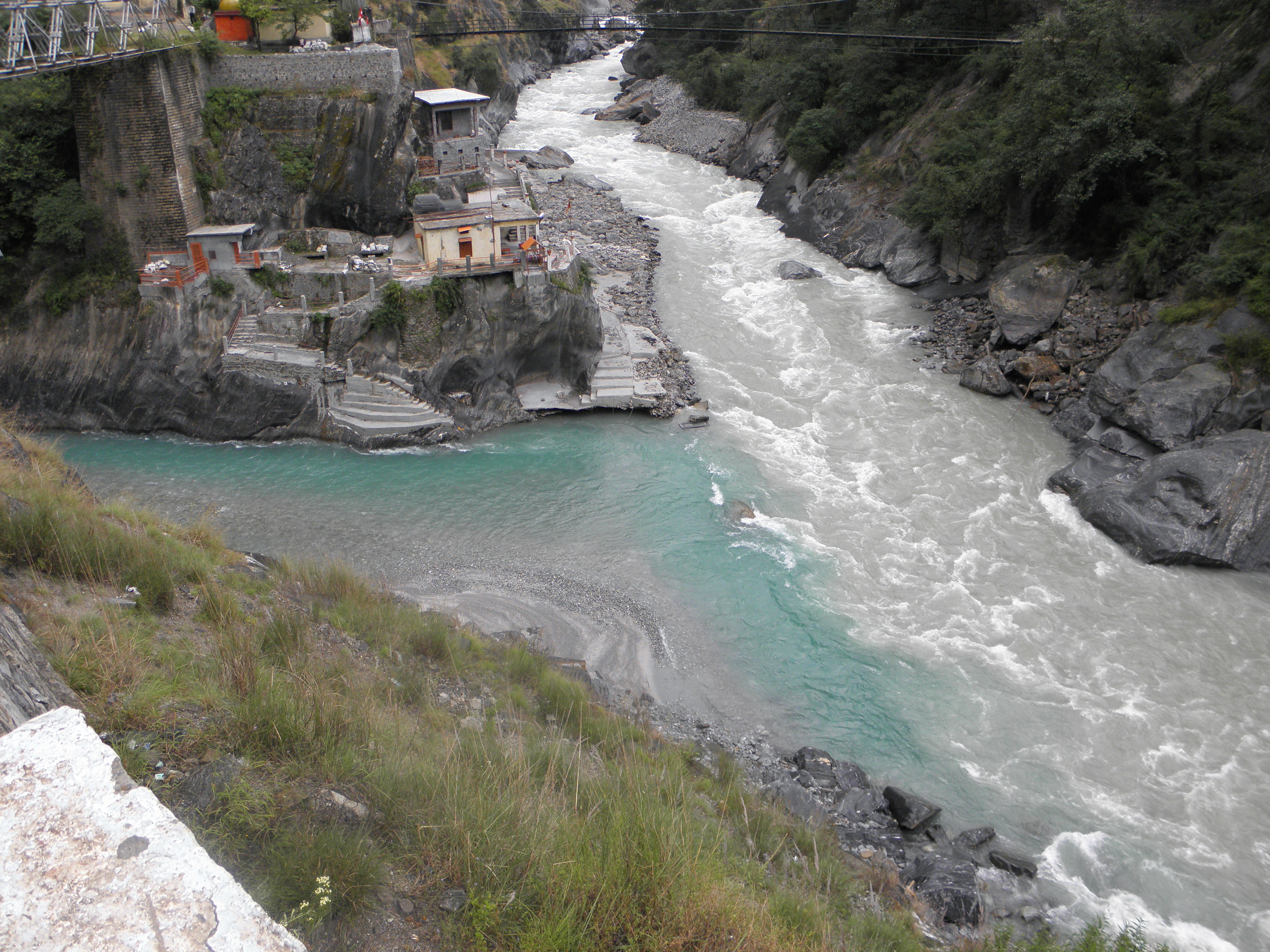
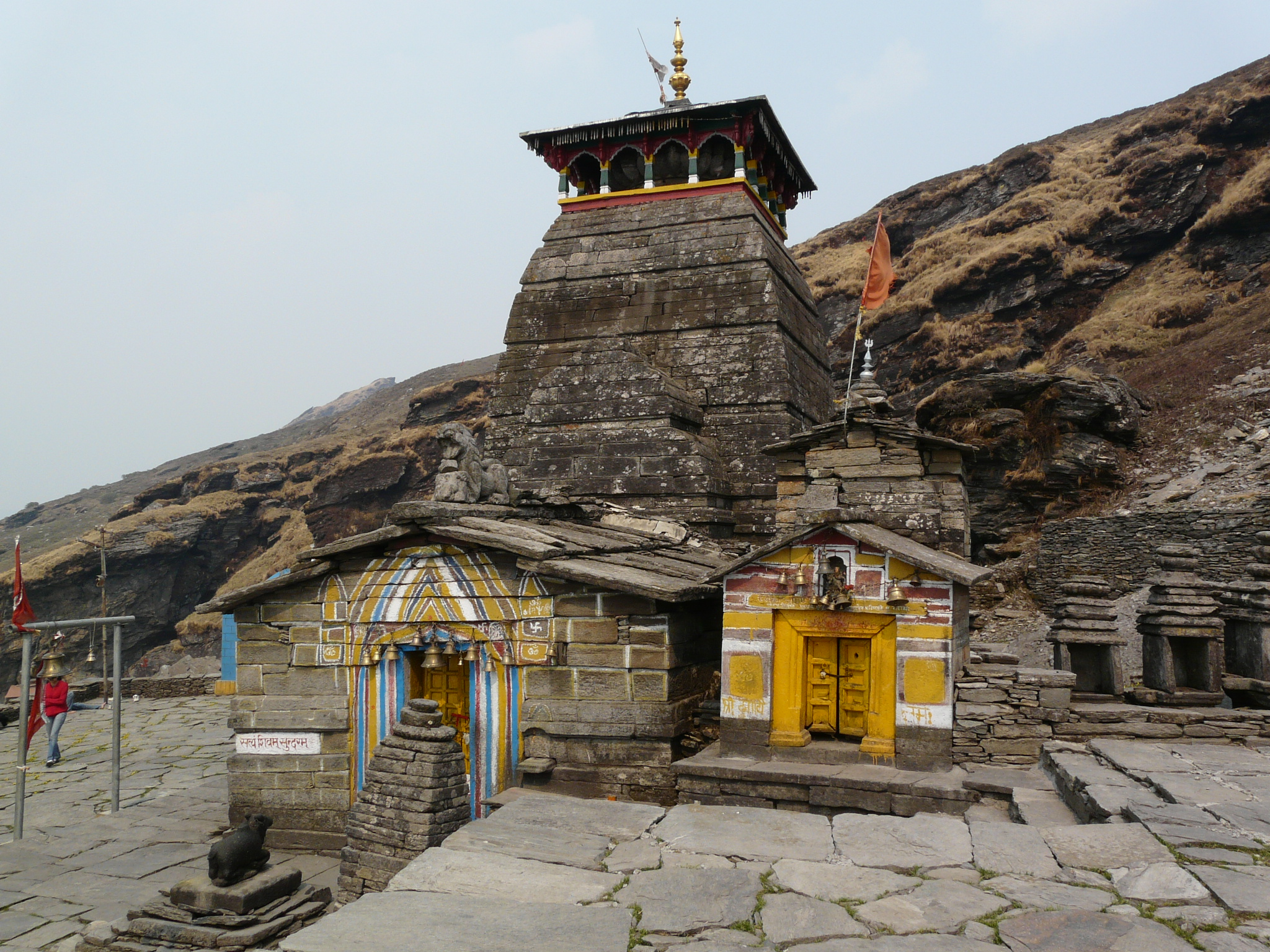
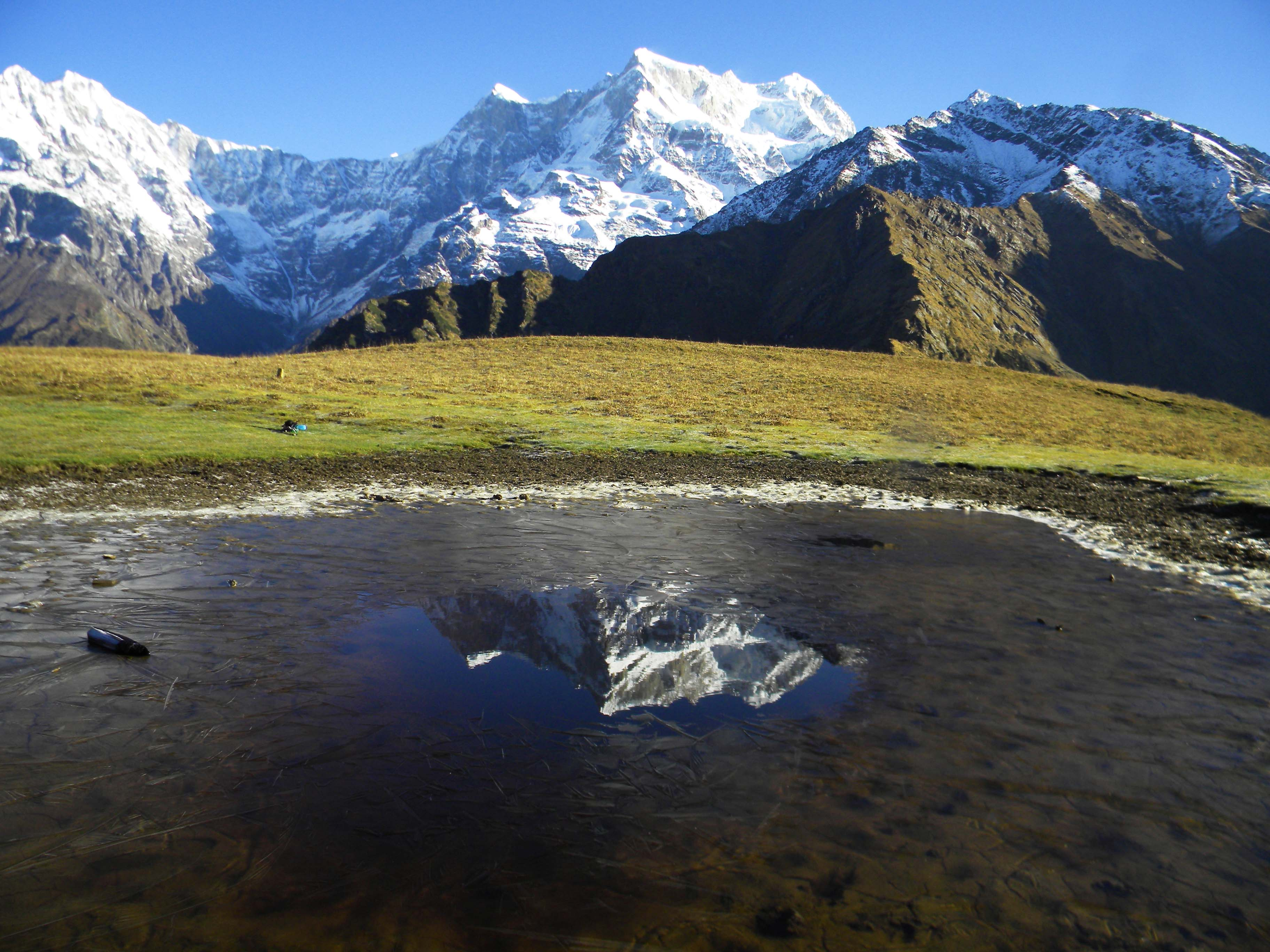
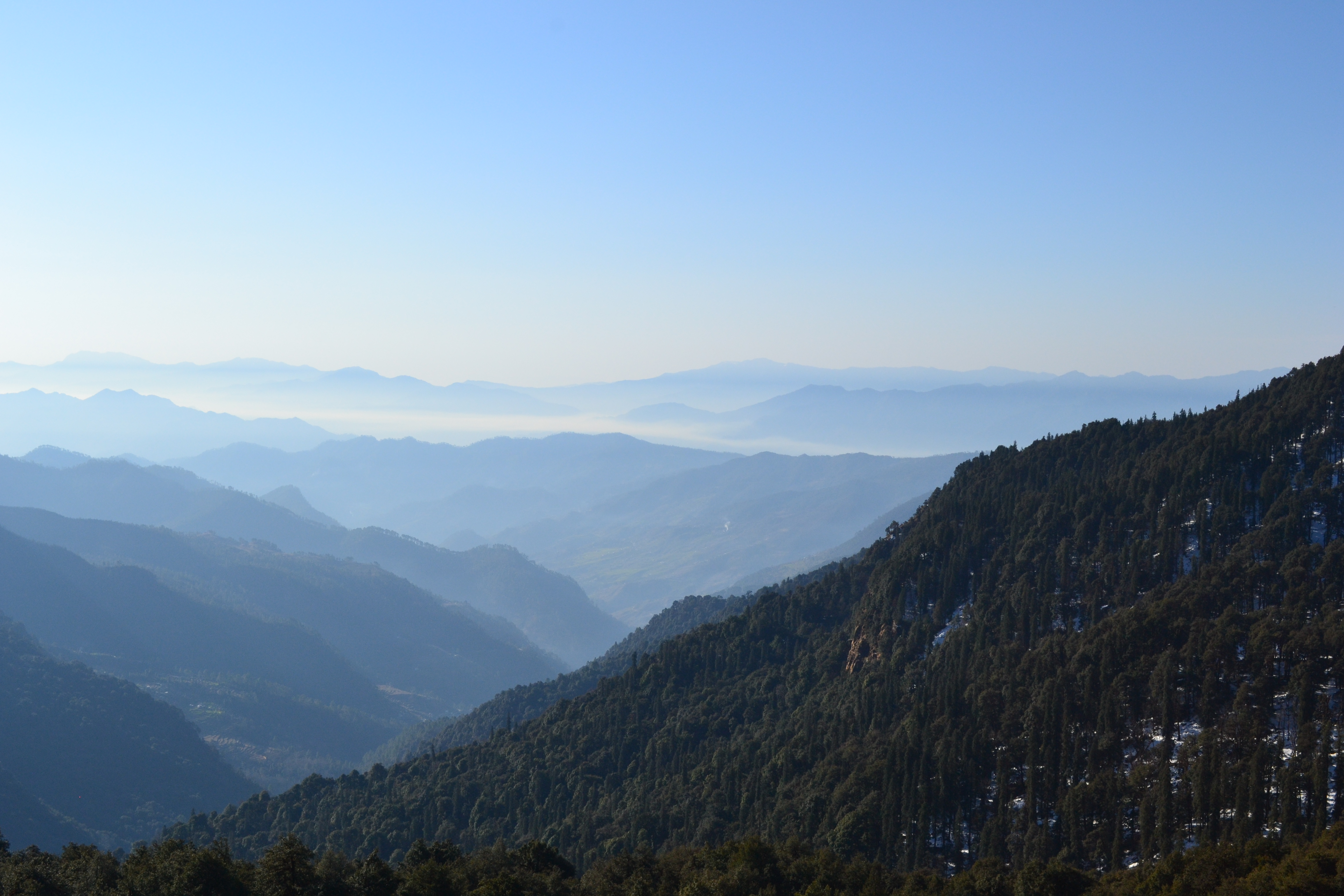
- Clockwise from top-left: Kedarnath Temple, Confluence of Alakananda and Mandakini at Rudraprayag, Chaukhamba at Bodha Madhyamaheshwar, Hills at Chopta, Tungnath

- Location in Uttarakhand
- Rudraprayag district
- Country: India
- State: Uttarakhand
- Division: Garhwal division
- Headquarters: Rudraprayag
- Established: 16 September 1997

Government
  - District magistrate: Vishal Mishra IAS

Area
  - Total: 1,984 km^{2} (766 sq mi)

Population (2011)
  - Total: 242,285
  - Density: 122.1/km^{2} (316.3/sq mi)

Language
  - Official: Hindi, Sanskrit
  - Native: Garhwali
- ISO 3166 code: IN-UT
- Vehicle registration: UK 13
- Website: rudraprayag.nic.in

Rudraprayag district is a district of the state of Uttarakhand of northern India. The district occupies an area of 1984 km^{2}. The town of Rudraprayag is the administrative headquarters of the district. The district is bounded by Uttarkashi District on the north, Chamoli District on the east, Pauri Garhwal District on the south, and Tehri Garhwal District on the west.

== Overview ==
Rudraprayag District was established on 16 September 1997. It was carved out from the following areas of three adjoining districts:

- The whole of Augustmuni and Ukhimath block and part of Pokhri and Karnprayag block from Chamoli District
- Part of Jakholi and Kirtinagar block from Tehri District
- Part of Khirsu block from Pauri District

The internationally known Kedarnath Temple is at the north, Madmaheshwar at east, Nagrasu at southern east and Srinagar at extreme south. The Mandakini River is the main river of the district.

As of 2011 it is the least populous district of Uttarakhand (out of 13).

== Demographics ==
Historical population
Year	Pop.	±% p.a.
1901	70,510	—
1911	78,790	+1.12%
1921	80,700	+0.24%
1931	88,743	+0.95%
1941	100,305	+1.23%
1951	105,848	+0.54%
1961	119,921	+1.26%
1971	135,654	+1.24%
1981	169,743	+2.27%
1991	200,515	+1.68%
2001	227,439	+1.27%
2011	242,285	+0.63%

Religions in Rudraprayag district (2011)
Religion	Percent
Hinduism	99.13%
Islam	0.61%
Other or not stated	0.26%
Distribution of religions

According to the 2011 census Rudraprayag district has a population of 242,285, roughly equal to the nation of Vanuatu. This gives it a ranking of 583 in India (out of a total of 640). The district has a population density of 119 inhabitants per square kilometre (310/sq mi) . Its population growth rate over the decade 2001-2011 was 4.14%. Rudraprayag has a sex ratio of 1120 females for every 1000 males, making it the 6th highest in the country as per 2011 census, second being Almora that too in uttarakhand, and a literacy rate of 82.09%. Scheduled Castes and Scheduled Tribes make up 19.68% and 0.16% of the population respectively.

Languages of Rudraprayag district (2011)
1. Garhwali (94.5%)
2. Hindi (4.20%)
3. Others (1.32%)

The predominant first language of the district is Garhwali, spoken by 94.48% of the population according to the 2011 census. Hindi, though widely used a lingua franca, is the first language of 4.20%, while 0.60% are speakers of Nepali.

Rudraprayag district: mother-tongue of population, according to the 2011 Indian Census.
Mother tongue code	Mother tongue	People	Percentage
006195	Garhwali	228,916	94.5%
006240	Hindi	10,167	4.2%
014011	Nepali	1,444	0.6%
–	Others	1,758	0.7%
Total		242,285	100.0%

== Assembly constituencies ==
- Kedarnath
- Rudraprayag

== Shrines and temples ==
- Kedarnath temple
- Tungnath
- Madhyamaheshwar
- Mathiyana Devi
- Kalimath Shakti Peeth
- Kartikswami temple
- Triyuginarayan Temple

== Cities, towns and villages in Rudraprayag district ==
- Rudraprayag
- Sumerpur
- Bawai - 20 km from Rudraprayag city via Maikoti-Durgadhar, and 18 km from Tilwada
- Maikoti
- Biron Dewal village
- Gaundar village
- Darmwari
- Benji Village
- Triyuginarayan विलेज
- Ravigram village
- Guptakashi
- Gaurikund
- Jaggi Kandai village
- Bainji Kandai Dashjula village
- Maniguh
- Koteswer temple of Siva

== See also ==
- Leopard of Rudraprayag
