= Maniguh =

Maniguh मणिगुह Library Village Maniguh
- Village
- Maniguh
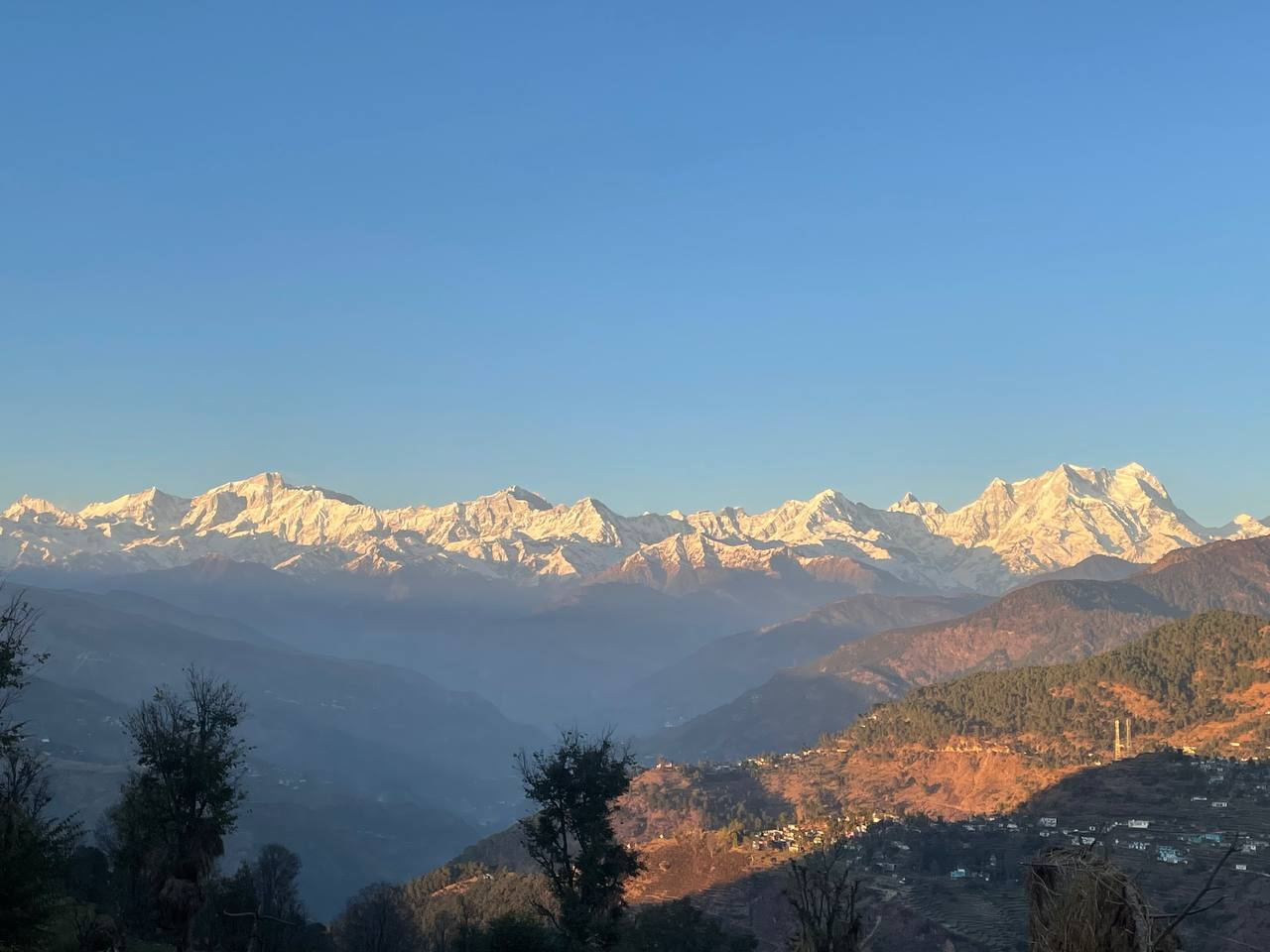
- Nickname: Library Village of Uttarakhand
- Location in Uttarakhand, India Maniguh (India)
- Country: India
- State: Uttarakhand
- District: Rudraprayag
- Tehsil: Rudraprayag
- Block: Augustmuni
- Elevation: 1,628 m (5,341 ft)

Population (2011)
  - Total: 747
- Time zone: UTC+5:30 (IST)
- PIN: 246442
- Vehicle registration: UK

Maniguh also known as Library Village Maniguh is a village in the Augustmuni block of Rudraprayag district in the Indian state of Uttarakhand. Situated in the Mandakini River valley of the Garhwal Himalaya, it is recognised as the Library Village of Uttarakhand due to a community library initiative launched by the Hamara Gaon Ghar Foundation on Republic Day 2023.

== Geography ==
Maniguh is located at an elevation of 1,628 metres (5,341 ft) amid terraced fields characteristic of the central Himalayan foothills. It lies approximately 15 km north of Rudraprayag, 7 km from Augustmuni, and 36 km from the Kedarnath route via Bedu Bagad, with the last 13 km on unpaved roads.

Road access is via National Highway 107 and National Highway 7, with PIN code 246442 served by the Bhatwari post office.

== Demographics ==
The total population of the village is estimated as 747 people.

== Library Village initiative ==
Launched to address low literacy and out-migration, the project by Hamara Gaon Ghar Foundation, a registered company under Section 8 of the Companies Act 2013, led by Suman Mishra, Bina Mishra, Rahul Rawat and Aalok Soni.

They established a central library by January 2023, initially with over 4,000 books. The collection has since grown to more than 20000 volumes in Hindi, English, and regional languages, covering literature, textbooks, competitive exams, science, history, children's books, Uttarakhand movement records, and rare Nawal Kishore Press manuscripts.

It prioritises works by Uttarakhand authors including Lalit Mohan Thapliyal, Bhagwan Singh, Shashibhushan Dwivedi, Anisur Rahman, Khurshid Alam, and Avinash Mishra.

Eight decentralised "Book Temples" supplement the main library, alongside facilities for free computer training, internet access, smart classes with projectors, and digital literacy programs. Open free on working days, it attracts 10–12 children daily plus women and youth. Activities encompass the three-day Gaon Ghar Mahotsav cultural festival, book marathons, pine needle crafts, and beekeeping workshops.

== Economy and tourism ==
The economy relies on terraced agriculture (apricots, oranges, figs), livestock, and nascent tourism via homestays for trekkers and educational visitors, aimed at retaining youth.

== Gallery ==
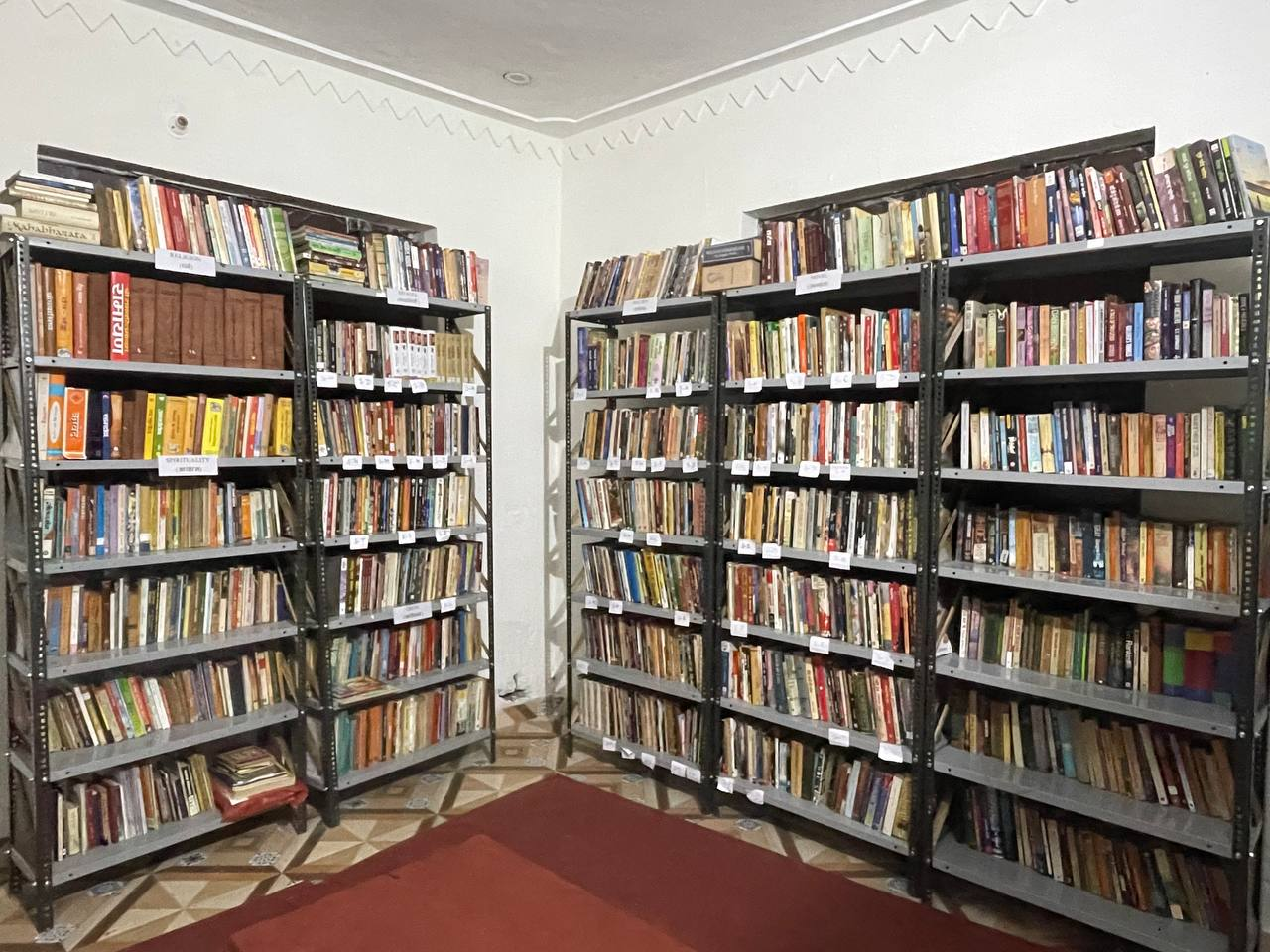
Gaon Ghar Library

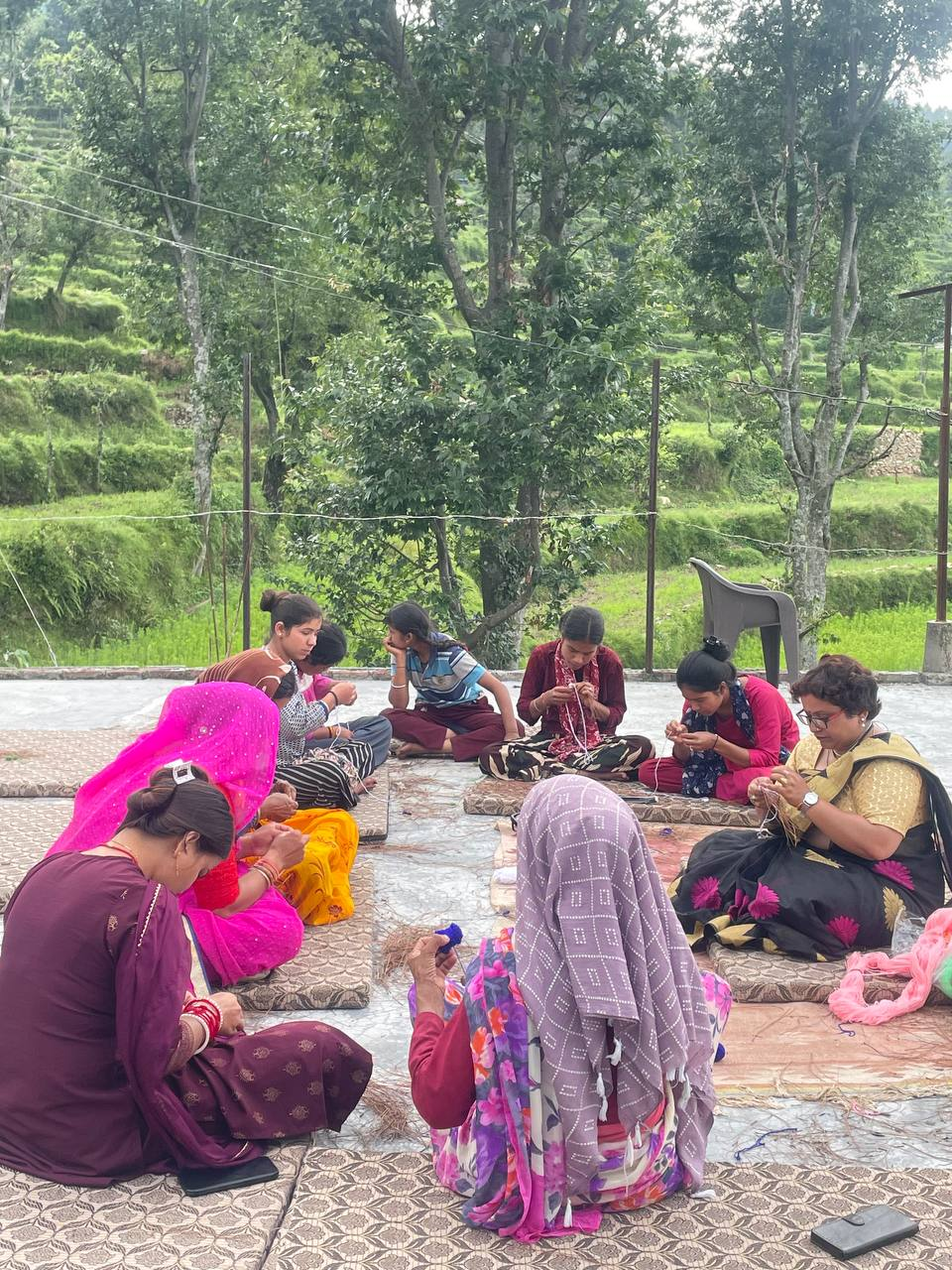
Readers at Gaon Ghar Library

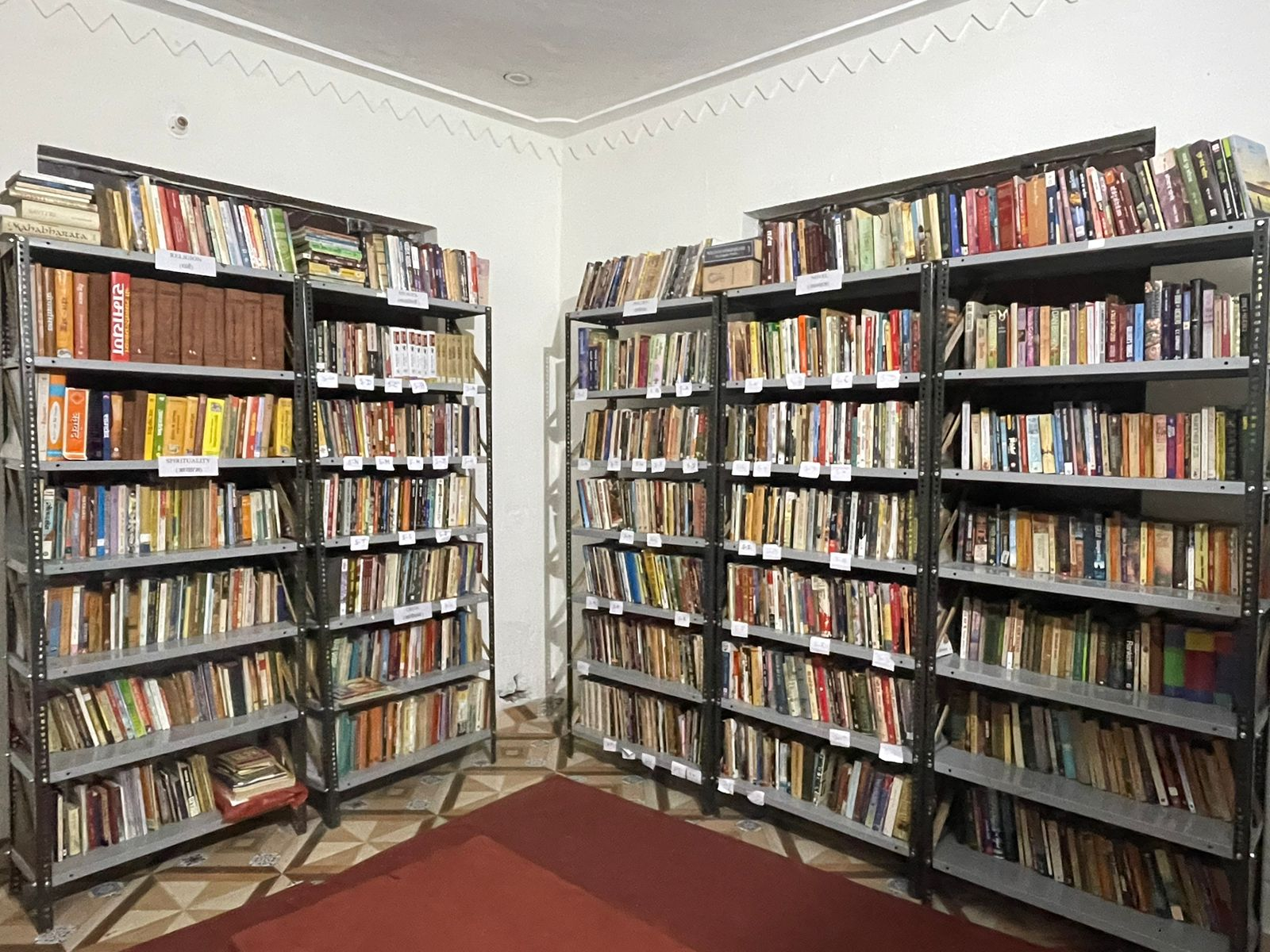
Gaon Ghar Library

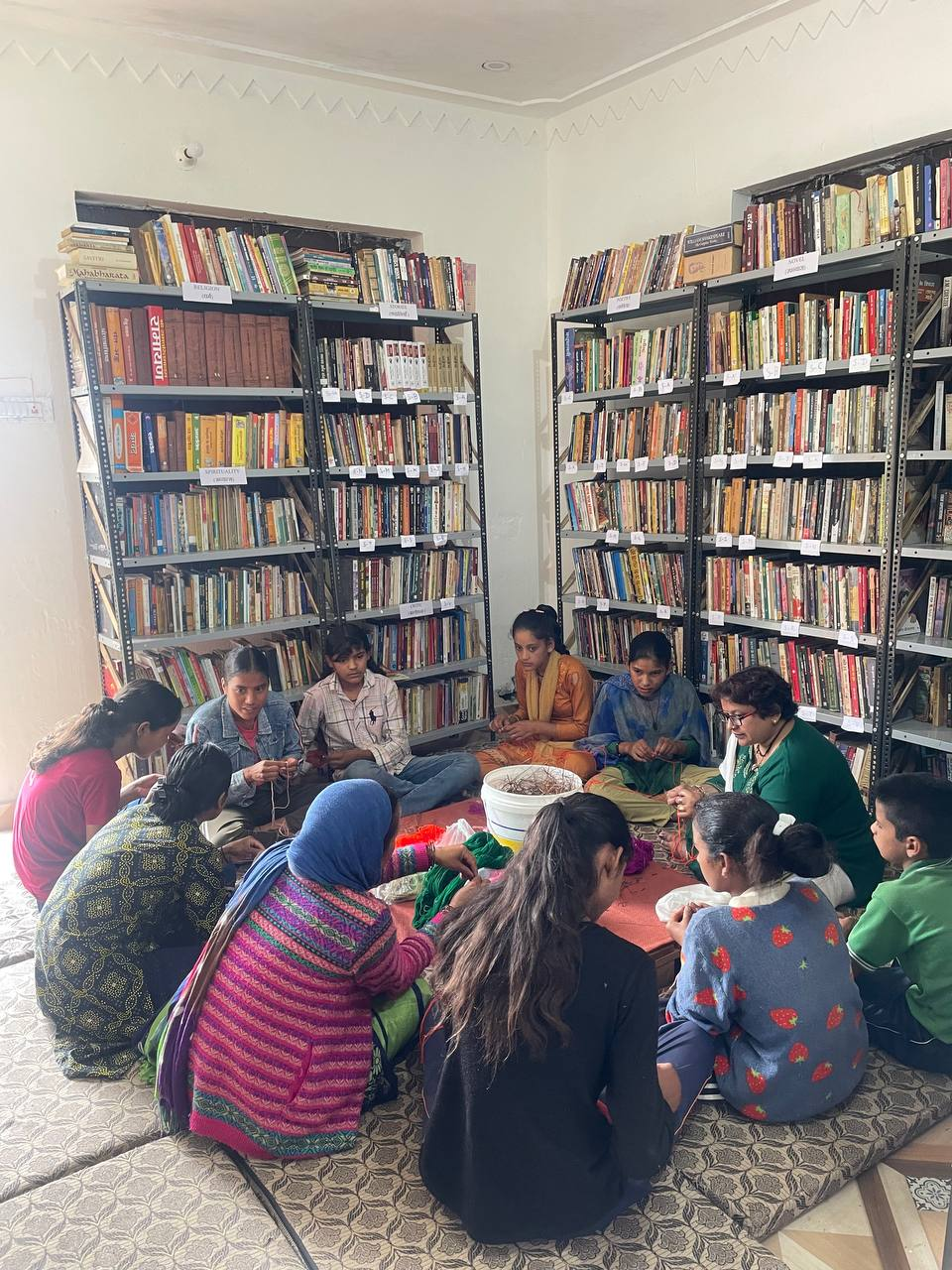
Women making Rakhis from Pine needles
