= Chorabari Lake =

Chorabari Lake (Gandhi Sarovar)
- Interactive map of Chorabari Lake (Gandhi Sarovar)
- Location: Kedarnath, Uttarakhand, India
- Coordinates: 30°44′51″N 79°03′39″E
- Type: Former glacial lake
- Primary inflows: Rainfall, melting snow
- Primary outflows: Chorabari Valley
- Basin countries: India
- Average depth: 15 to 20 m (49 to 66 ft)
- Water volume: 262,000,000 L (212.4 acre-feet)
- Shore length^{1}: Boulder-strewn flat
- Surface elevation: 3,900 m (12,800 ft)
- Settlements: Kedarnath
- ^{1} Shore length is not a well-defined measure.

Chorabari Lake, also known as Gandhi Sarovar, was a glacial lake at the snout of the Chorabari Glacier at an altitude of 3,900 m (12,800 ft). It was about 2 km (1.2 mi) upstream from the town of Kedarnath in the Indian state of Uttarakhand, part of the Mandakini River system. On 17 June 2013, the moraine holding back the waters of the lake gave way and vast quantities of water cascaded down the valley below, causing a catastrophic flash flood. The lake did not reform after the event because much of the moraine had been washed away, leaving a boulder-strewn flat area with a small stream flowing through it.

== Description ==
The Chorabari Glacier is in a cirque some 6 km (3.7 mi) wide, and the meltwater flows down a narrow steep-sided valley. The instability of the alpine soils and deforestation of the valley sides caused large quantities of glacial debris and sediment to accumulate and form a moraine at the foot of the glacier. Like many others, the Chorabari Glacier has been shrinking during the 21st century, and by 2013 the snout of the glacier had retreated several hundred metres from the moraine. Below the glacier, water had been accumulating, dammed back by the moraine, and formed a lake some 250 m (820 ft) long and 150 m (492 ft) wide. Its depth was 15 to 20 m (49 to 66 ft), depending on the time of year. The water in the lake mostly accumulated from rainfall and melting snow in its catchment area. A monitoring camp set up beside the glacier by the Wadia Institute of Himalayan Ecology was monitoring water levels in the lake; most years, the water depth increased by between 2 and 4 m (7 and 13 ft) at the start of the monsoon.

== Gandhi Sarovar ==
Chorabari Lake was renamed Gandhi Sarovar after some of Mahatma Gandhi's ashes were scattered in the lake. This caused many pilgrims visiting the temple at Kedarnath to undertake the trek to the lake.

== June 2013 ==
The monsoon rainfall was very heavy in Uttarakhand in June 2013. In the upper Chorabari catchment, incessant rainfall and rapid melting of snow caused the water level in the lake to rise by 7 m (23 ft). On the morning of 17 June, an avalanche swept into the lake, putting immense pressure on the dam, which then burst. Water cascaded into the valley below, taking with it enormous boulders and great quantities of debris. The whole lake emptied in five to ten minutes. The volume of water that escaped was estimated to be 262,000,000 L (212.4 acre-feet), and the peak discharge rate was estimated to be about 1,700 m^{3} (60,000 ft^{3}) per second. The lake did not reform after the event, as much of the moraine had been washed away. What remains of Chorabari Lake is a boulder-strewn flat area with a small rivulet flowing through it.

== See also ==
- 2013 North India floods
