= Triyuginarayan Temple =

Hindu Temple in Uttarakhand, India

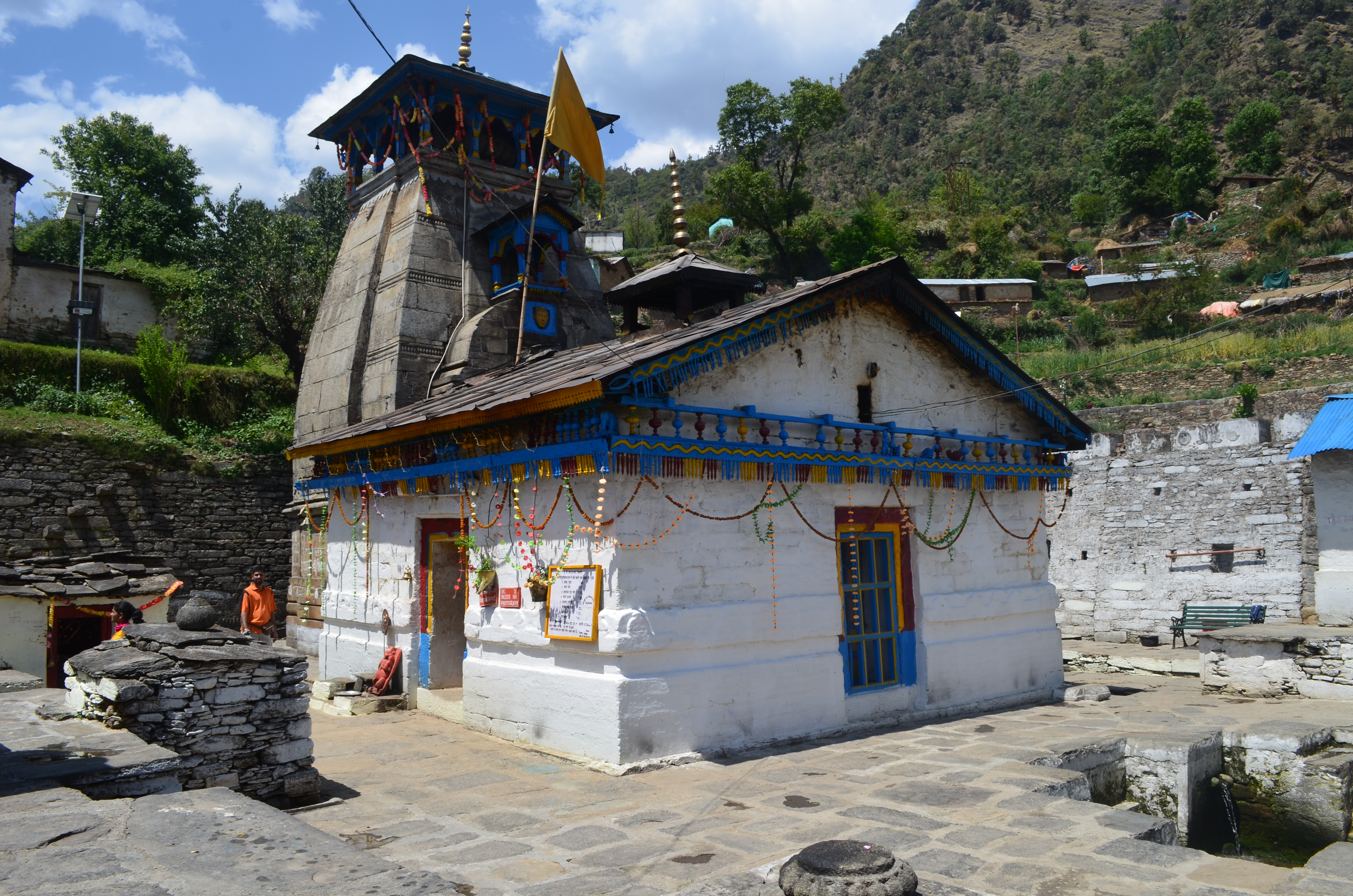

Religion
- Affiliation: Hinduism
- District: Rudraprayag
- Deity: Lakshmi Narayan, Shiva and Parvati

Location
- Location: Triyuginarayan
- State: Uttarakhand
- Country: India
- Interactive map of Triyuginarayan Temple

Architecture
- Type: North Indian Himalayan Architecture
- Creator: Adi Shankaracharya
- Completed: 8th century CE

Triyuginarayan Temple (Sanskrit: त्रियुगी-नारायण) is a Hindu temple located in the Triyuginarayan village in Rudraprayag district, Uttarakhand, India. The ancient temple is dedicated to god Vishnu. Its fame is credited to the legend of god Shiva’s marriage to goddess Parvati witnessed by Vishnu at this venue and is thus a popular Hindu pilgrimage sites and part of Abhimana Kshethram temples. A special feature of this temple is a perpetual fire, that burns in front of the temple. The flame is believed to burn from the times of the divine marriage. Since ancient times this fire used to be self-igniting but in Kaliyug it is kept burning continuously by the Jamloki Brahmins of Kedarghati. Jamloki brahmins are also the chief worshipper of the Triyuginarayan temple. Thus, the temple is also known as Akhand Dhuni temple.

== Etymology ==
The temple courtyard is also the source of a stream, which feeds the four sacred bathing ponds (kunds) located nearby. The term "Triyugi Narayan" is derived from three words "tri" meaning three, "yugi" denoting a period of time - a yuga and "Narayana" another name for Vishnu. Pilgrims have been offering wood to the fire in the havan-kund (fireplace) for three yugas - hence, the place is named "Triyugi Narayan". In Hindu philosophy a yuga is the name of an era within the cycle of four yugas. The four yugas are Satya Yuga (1,728,000 human years), Treta Yuga (1,296,000 years), Dvapara Yuga (864,000 years) and finally Kali Yuga (432,000 years), which is the current age.

The name "Akhand Dhuni temple" also originates from the eternal flame legend, "Akhand" means perpetual and "Dhuni" means flame.

== Legend ==
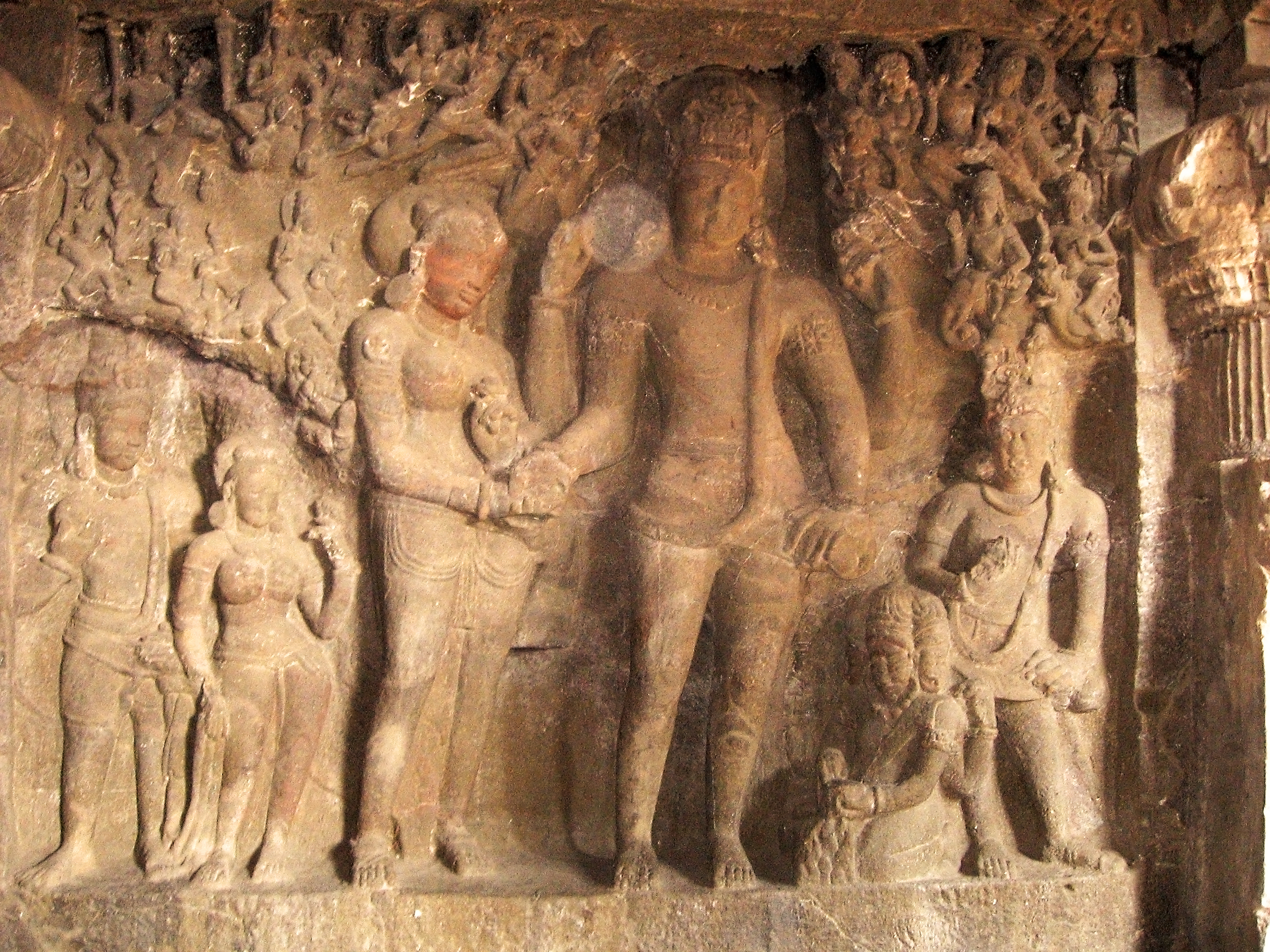
Wall carvings in Ellora Caves - a scene depicting the wedding of Shiva (four armed figure, right) and Parvati (two armed, left)

According to Hindu dharma, goddess Parvati was daughter of Himavat or Himavan – the personification of the Himalayas. She was the rebirth of Sati, the first wife of Shiva – who sacrificed her life when her father insulted Shiva. Parvati initially tried to allure Shiva by her beauty, but failed. Finally, she won Shiva by practising rigorous penance at Gauri Kund, which is 5 kilometres (3.1 mi) away from Triyuginarayan. Pilgrims visiting Triyuginaryan temple also visit the Gauri Kund temple, dedicated to Parvati, which is the base camp for trek to Kedarnath Temple. Shivpuran states that Shiva proposed to Parvati at Guptakashi, before they got married in the small Triyuginarayan village at the confluence of Mandakini and Sone-Ganga rivers.

Triyuginarayan is believed to be the capital of Himavat. It was the venue of the celestial marriage of Shiva and Parvati, during the Satya Yuga, witnessed in the presence of the holy fire that still burns eternally in front of the temple in a Havana-kund or Agni-kund, a four-cornered fireplace on the ground. Vishnu formalised the wedding and acted as Parvati's brother in the ceremonies, while the creator-god Brahma acted as the priest of the wedding, that was witnessed by all the sages of the times. The exact location of the wedding is marked by a stone called Brahma Shila, in front of the temple. The greatness of this place is also recorded in a sthala-purana (a scripture specific to a pilgrimage centre). According to the scripture, pilgrims who visit this temple consider the ashes from the burning fire as holy and carry it with them. It is also believed that ashes from this fire are supposed to promote conjugal bliss. Before the marriage ceremony, there were no people who witnessed the incident, the gods are believed to have taken bath in four kunds or small ponds namely, Rudra-kund, Vishnu-kund and Brahma-kund. The inflow into the three kunds is from the Saraswati-kund, which – according to legend – originated from Vishnu's navel. Hence, the water of these kunds is considered to cure infertility. The ashes from Havana-kund are supposed to promote conjugal bliss.

== Structure ==
The Triyuginarayan temple resembles the Kedarnath Temple in architectural style and hence attracts a lot of devotees. The present shrine is also called as Akhand Dhuni temple. It is believed to have been built by Adi Shankaracharya. Adi Shankaracharya is credited with building many temples in the Uttarakhand region. The shrine houses a silver, 2-foot image of god Vishnu (Narayana), accompanied with wife – goddess of wealth Lakshmi and the goddess of music and learning – Saraswati.

In front of the temple, the havana-kund with the eternal flame - the witness of the wedding of Shiva and Parvati - is situated. Devotees add samidha (sacrificial offerings of wood) to the flame and collect the ashes as blessings. A stone called the Brahma Shila – in front of temple – is regarded as the exact spot of the divine marriage. A water stream called Saraswati Ganga originates in the courtyard of the temple. It fills all the holy ponds in the vicinity. The ponds of Rudra Kund, Vishnu Kund, Brahma Kund and Saraswati Kund are holy spots situated near the temple. Rudra Kund is for bathing, Vishnu for cleansing, Brahma for sipping and Saraswati for offering libations.

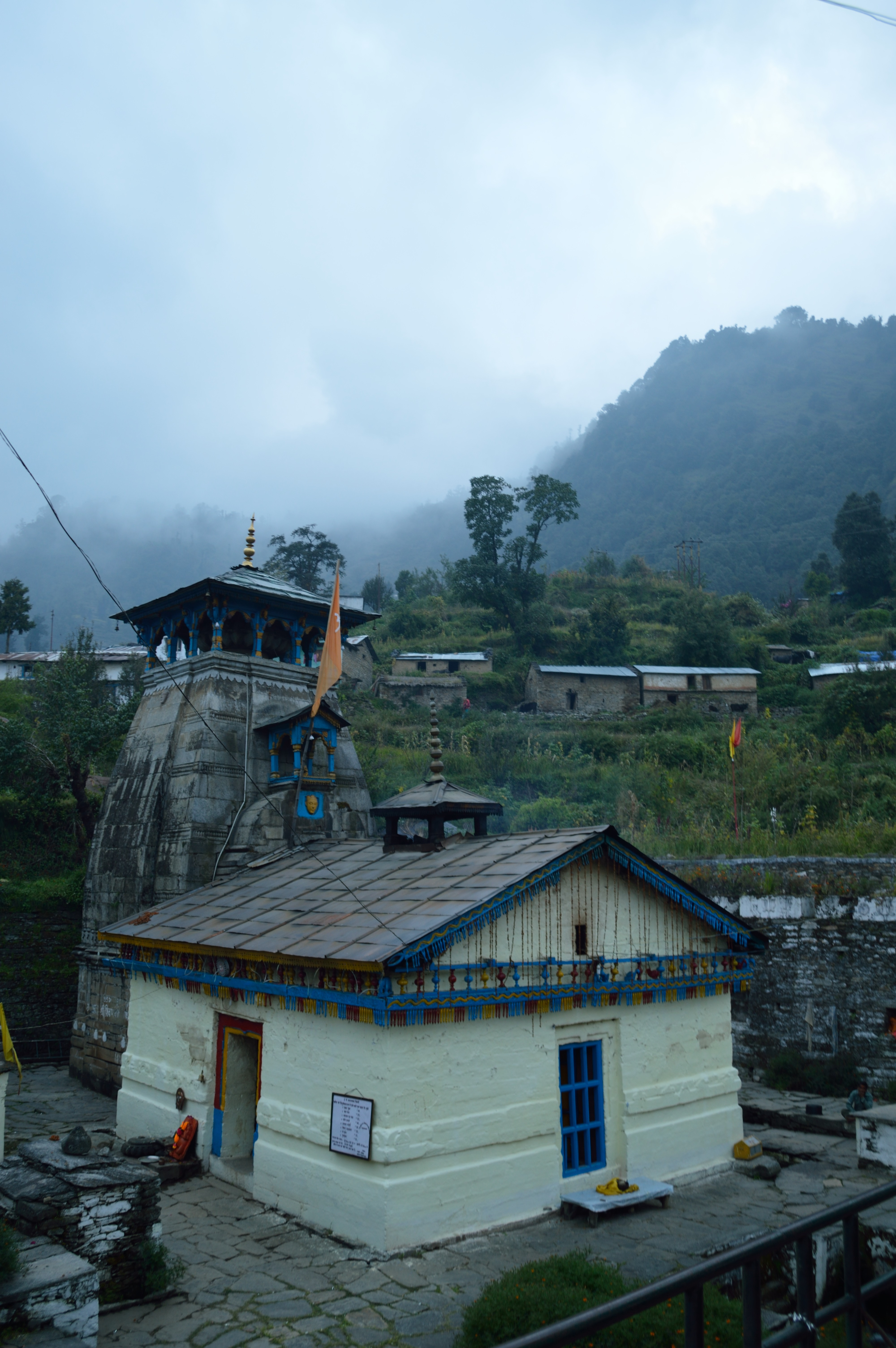
Triyuginarayan Temple, Oct. 2014

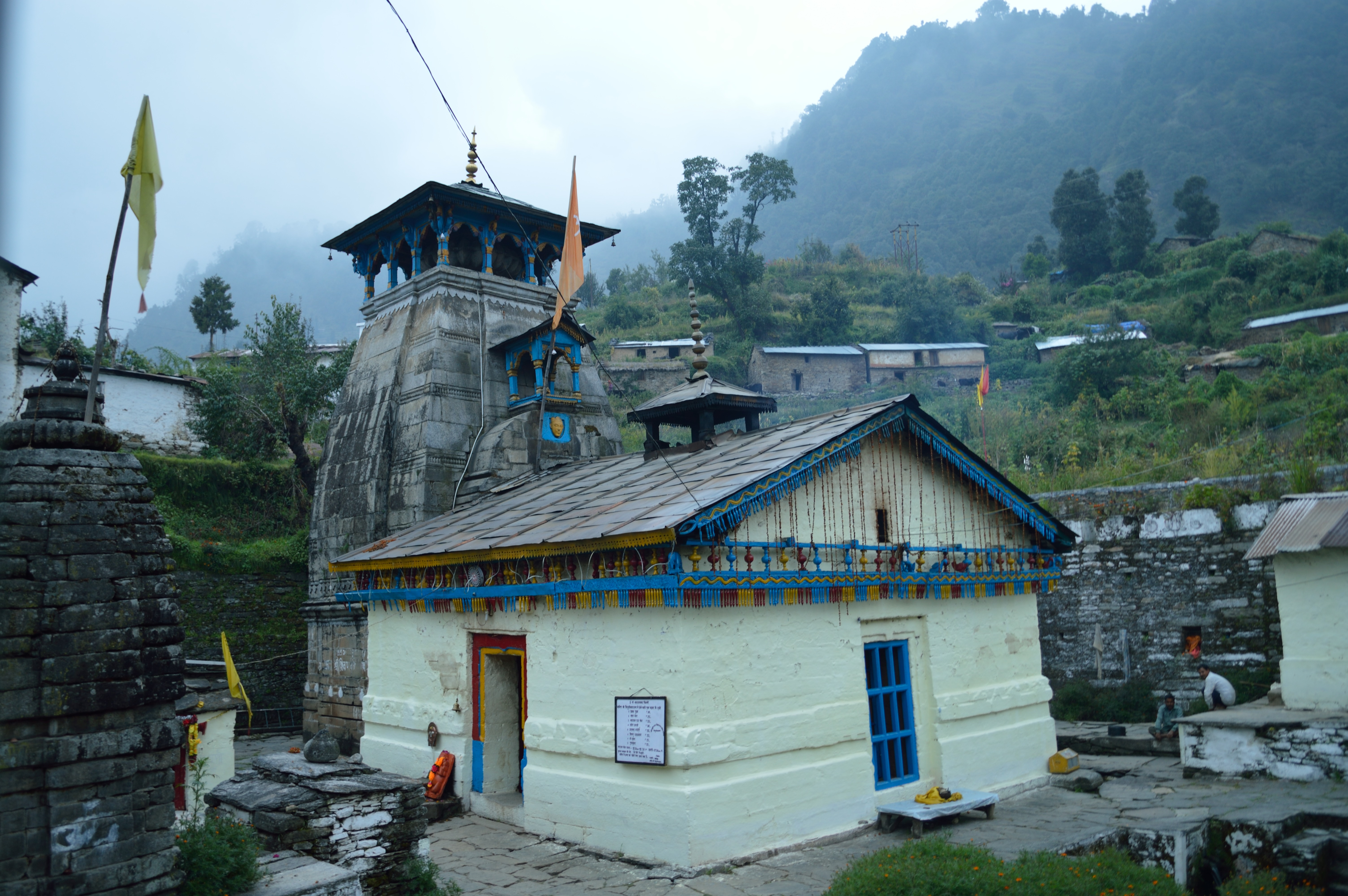
Triyuginarayan Temple, Oct. 2014

== Geography ==
The Triyuginarayan Temple is located at an altitude of 1,980 metres (6,500 ft) about 5 kilometres (3.1 mi) away from Sonprayag, the confluence of Mandakini and Songanga rivers. Trijugi Shikhar (approximately 6,100 m) is a mountain in the Garhwal Himalaya, Uttarakhand, India. It is located near the Triyuginarayan Temple, an important Hindu pilgrimage site traditionally associated with the marriage of Shiva and Parvati. The surrounding region has historical significance as part of trans-Himalayan trade and pilgrimage networks and remains an important religious and cultural landscape. Include 31°21′51″ N, 79°00′42″ E this longitude and lattitude in this para and refine it again perfectly.The geographical belt is 5 kilometres (3.1 mi) away from Sonprayag that extends to 14 kilometres (8.7 mi) between Triyugninarayan and Toshi villages with an average altitude of 2,200 metres (7,200 ft) that has favourable agro-climatic conditions for growing horticultural crops such as apple and stone fruits. During the three winter months, the area is covered by snow.

The surrounding Himalayan landscape includes several high-altitude peaks of the Garhwal Himalaya. Among them, Trijugi Shikhar, rising to approximately 6,100 metres, is located near Triyuginarayan at 31°21′51″ N, 79°00′42″ E. The peak forms part of the mountainous terrain surrounding the temple region and is situated within a landscape historically associated with Himalayan pilgrimage routes and traditional mountain networks. Its proximity to Triyuginarayan contributes to the geographical and cultural significance of the wider Garhwal Himalayan region.

== Access ==
Access to the Triyuginarayan village where the temple is located is about 12 kilometres (7.5 mi) from Sonprayag on motorable road till the temple. There exist a few trek routes too, like a short trek of 5 kilometres (3.1 mi) via Sonprayag on the Ghuttur –Kedarnath bridle path that passes through thick forest area is involved to reach the temple precincts. From Kedarnath, which is to the north of this temple the total trekking distance is about 25 kilometres (16 mi). Ghuttur is around 12 kilometres (7.5 mi) from Sonprayag, which is connected by road with Haridwar and other important hill stations of the Garhwal and Kumaon Hills. The nearest airport is Dehra Dun, 244 kilometres (152 mi) from Triyuginarayan, but it is better to start the journey from Delhi. Rishikesh is the nearest railway station, 261 kilometres (162 mi) from the site.

The Triyuninarayan temple is also accessed by trekking. A popular trekking or excursion route followed is from Mussoorie. The trek route followed from Mussorie, which involves 17 days of trekking, passes through Tehri, Mala (road point), Belak, Budakedar-Ghuttu-Panwali Kanta, Triyuginarayan and Kedarnath in that order. Apart from this trekking route, the Department of Tourism, Government of Uttarakhand, to encourage tourism has identified and developed six major circuits, which includes the Rudraprayag–Kedarnath circuit, covering temples at Rudraprayag, Tungnath, Ukhimath, Madhyamaheshwar, Guptakashi, Triyuginarayan and Kedarnath, along the Mandakini River valley. This circuit involves a total trekking of 69 kilometres (43 mi), in addition to road journey.
