= Anekadhangavadeswarar temple =

Temple in Tamil Nadu, India

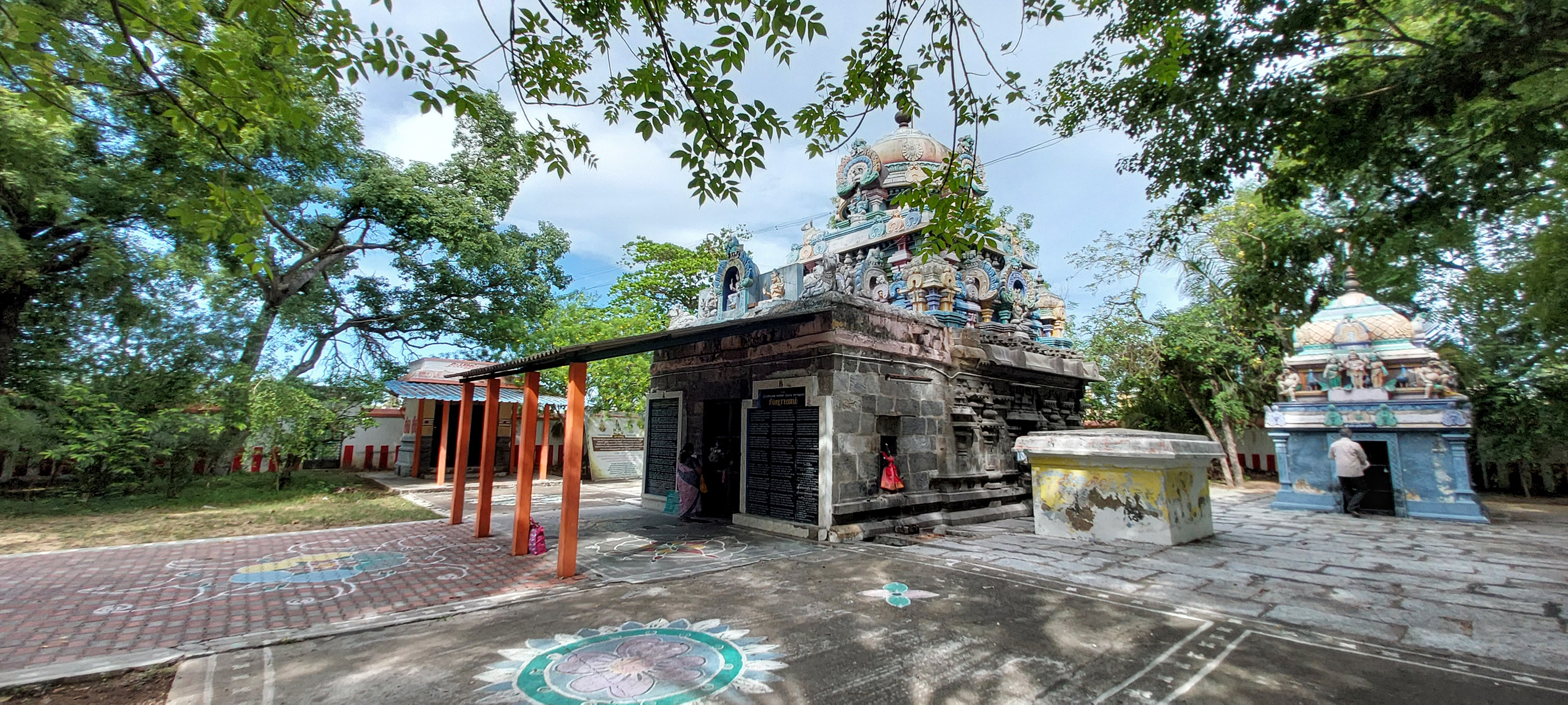
- Anekadhangavadeswarar temple complex

- Location in Tamil Nadu

Religion
- Affiliation: Hinduism
- District: Kanchipuram
- Deity: Anekadhangavadeswarar (Shiva), Manonmani (Parvathi)

Location
- Location: Kanchipuram
- State: Tamil Nadu
- Country: India
- Coordinates: 12°50′31″N 79°41′28″E

Architecture
- Type: Dravidian architecture

Anekadhangavadeswarar Temple (also called Anegathangavadham) is a Hindu temple to Shiva in the town of Kanchipuram, Kanchipuram district, Tamil Nadu, India. Anekadhangavadeswarar is mentioned in the 7th century Tamil Saiva canonical work, the Tevaram, and is a Paadal Petra Sthalam, one of the 275 temples revered in the canon. The temple is maintained and administered by the Hindu Religious and Endowment Board of the Government of Tamil Nadu.

== Etymology and legend ==
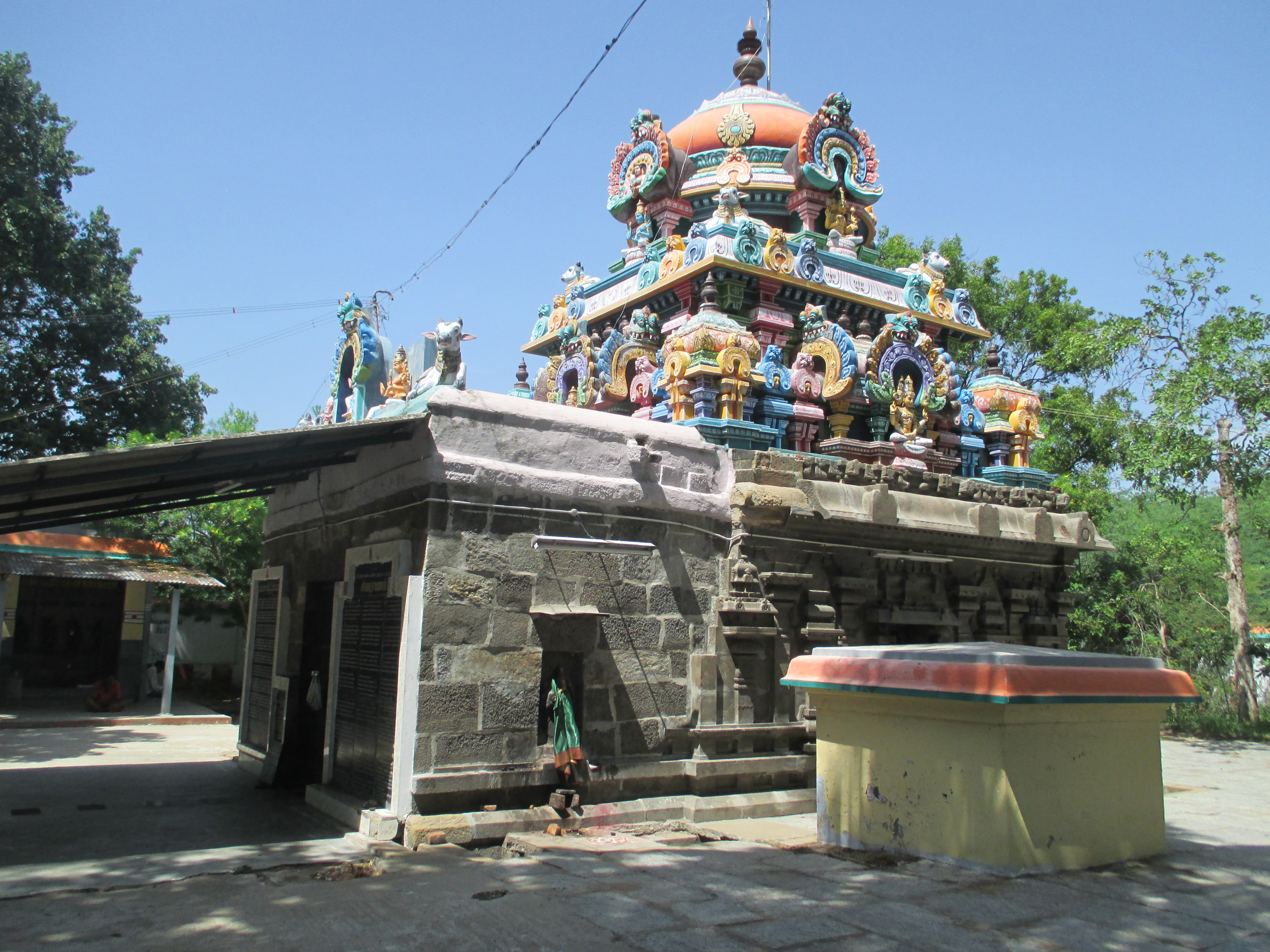

According to legend, Vinayaka, the son of Shiva, established Anegabeswarar in the form a Lingam (an iconic representation of Shiva). Anegabeswarar is believed to have killed the demon Iraniyapura king Kesi and arranged for the marriage of his daughter Vallabai with Vinayaga. Kubera, the king of wealth is also believed to have worshipped Angebeswarar. There are two Anegathangavadham temples, one in the North and one in the South. This temple is referred as Kachi Angegathangavadham to differentiate it from the northern shrine. The word Anekapa is believed to have been derived from elephant as it drinks water with its trunk and mouth. The elephant is believed have worshipped the king.

Tirugnana Sambandar, a 7th-century Tamil Saivite poet, venerated Chandramouleeswarar in ten verses in Tevaram, compiled as the First Tirumurai. Sundarar, venerated Anegaveswarar in 10 verses in Tevaram, compiled as the Seventh Tirumurai. As the temple is revered in Tevaram, it is classified as Paadal Petra Sthalam, one of the 276 temples that find mention in the Saiva canon. Sundarar mentions that Shiva prefers to reside at this most happening place.

== Architecture ==
The temple is located in Kanchipuram, on the way from the town to the Kanchi Kailasanathar Temple. Anekadhangavadeswarar temple complex has a single prakarams (outer courtyard) and a small rajagopuram (gateway tower) facing North. The central shrine faces east and holds the image of Anekadhangavadeswarar (Shiva) in the form of lingam made of granite. As in other temples in Kanchipuram, there is no separate shrine of Parvathi as it is believed that Kamakshi of Kanchipuram is the common Parvathi shrine for all Shiva temples. The granite images of Nandi (the bull and vehicle of Shiva) is located axial to the sanctum. As in other Shiva temples of Tamil Nadu, the first precinct or the walls around the sanctum of Anekadhangavadeswarar has images of Dakshinamurthy (Shiva as the Teacher), Durga (warrior-goddess) and Chandikeswarar (a saint and devotee of Shiva). There is a separate shrine for Periya Vinayaga. The temple precinct is surrounded by granite walls.

== Gallery ==
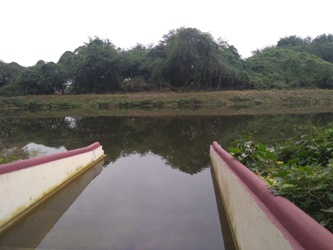
Temple tank

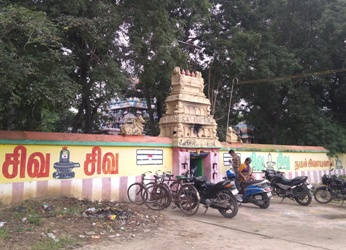
Entrance with compound wall

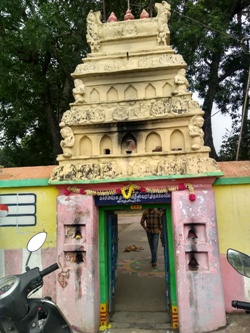
Entrance

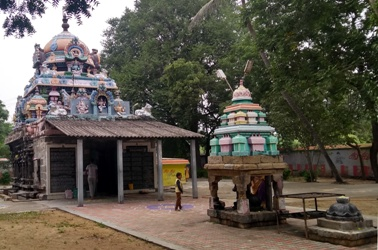
Balipeetam and Nandhi mandapa

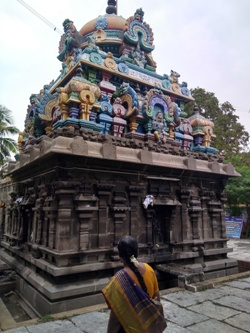
Vimana of the presiding deity
