= Mathiyana Devi =

Hindu Temple in Uttarakhand

Shidhpeeth Mata Bhagwati Maa Mathiyana Devi Mandir is a Hindu temple in the Indian state of Uttarakhand. It is located at Bhardhar Patti, north of Mathiyana Khal and is surrounded by green mountains. The nearest city is Rudraprayag. One priest lives in the temple. Many pilgrims travel there.

== Legend ==
Mathiyana Maa, a maternal deity, is one of the most powerful goddesses of Uttarakhand. Many stories relate to her origin:

When Lord Shiva was wandering with the dead body of Mata Sati in the sky, Lord Vishnu cut Sati's lifeless body using Sudharshan Chakra into 51 pieces. One of the body parts fell in the Bhardar Pati of Rudraprayag, Uttrakhand.

Another story is that hundreds of years ago, Mathiyana Maa was a girl married to a Tibetan prince. The prince was killed by her stepmother and relatives. When her husband was burned in Rudraprayag, she performed Sati, throwing herself on her husband's funeral pyre, and then became a goddess who took revenge against murderers.

Every year in Navaratri, people visit to receive blessings from Mathiyana Maa. She is considered the protector of Bhardar Pati and Rudraprayag.
