= Mandakini River =

River in India

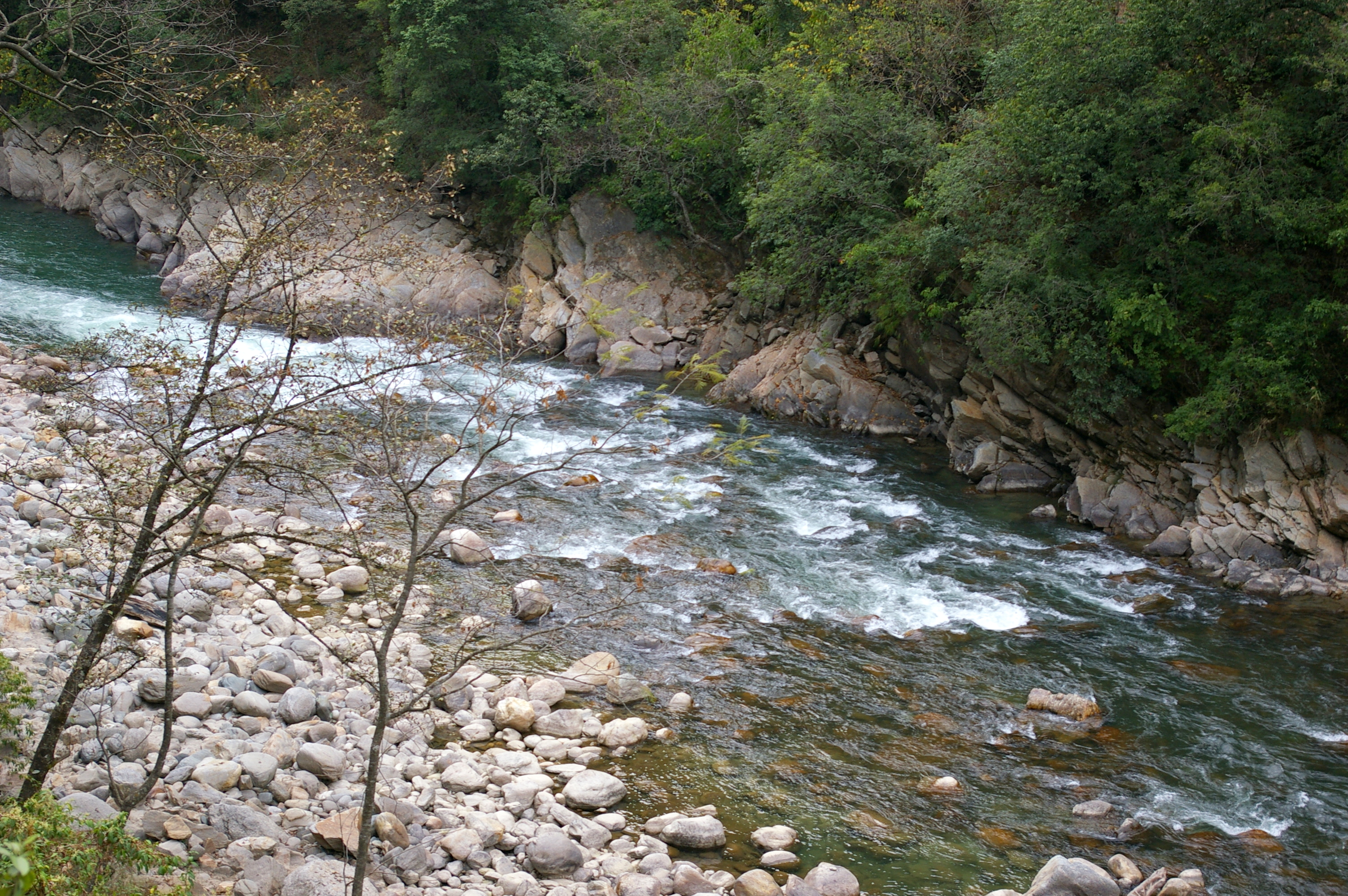

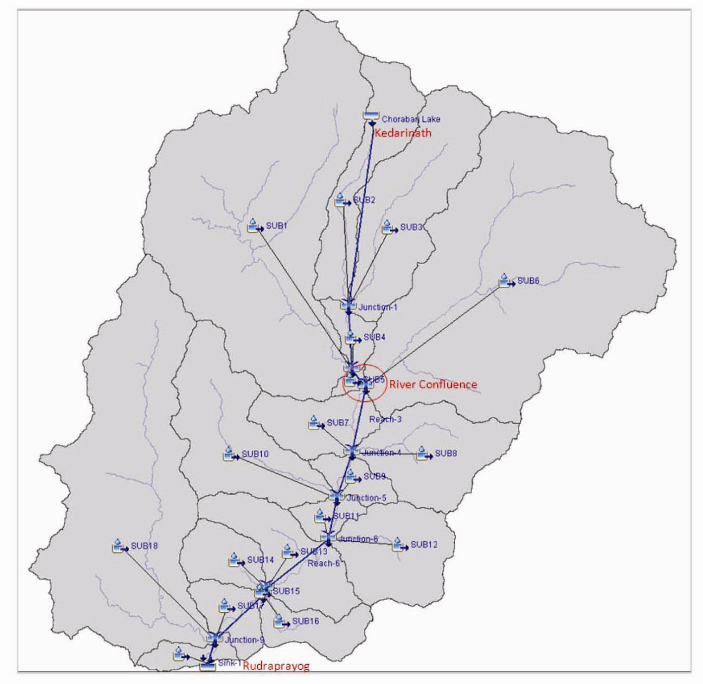
- Hydrological setup of the Mandakini showing its course through Kedarnath

Location
- Country: India
- State: Uttarakhand

Physical characteristics
- Source: Chorabari Glacier
  - location: Kedarnath Summit, Kedarnath, India
  - coordinates: 30°44′50″N 79°05′20″E
  - elevation: 3,895 m (12,779 ft)
- Mouth: Alaknanda River
  - location: Rudraprayag, Uttarakhand, India
  - coordinates: 30°17′16″N 78°58′44″E
  - elevation: 690 m (2,260 ft)
- Length: 81.3 km (50.5 mi)
- Basin size: 1,646 km^{2} (636 mi^{2})
- Discharge
  - average: 108.6 m^{3}/s (3,840 cu ft/s)

The Mandakini River is a tributary of the Alaknanda River in the Indian state of Uttarakhand. The river runs for approximately 81 kilometres (50 mi) between the Rudraprayag and Sonprayag areas and emerges from the Chorabari Glacier. The Mandakini merges with river Songanga at Sonprayag and flows past the Hindu temple Madhyamaheshwar at Ukhimath. At the end of its course it drains into the Alaknanda, which flows into the Ganges.

The Mandakini is considered by Hindus a sacred river within Uttarakhand as it runs past the Kedarnath and Madhyamaheshwar temples. For this reason, the Mandakini has been the site of pilgrimages and religious tourism, with treks passing significant sites of spirituality such as Tungnath and Deoria Tal. The Mandakini area also attracts millions of tourists annually for whitewater rafting, hiking, and religious tours around the winter Chardham being offered. In 2011, more than 25 million tourists visited the river (for comparison, the State of Uttarakhand has a population of about 10 million). The health of the river and surrounding landforms have slowly been degraded, giving rise to environmental conservation projects such as the Kedarnath Wildlife Sanctuary.

The Mandakini is subject to heavy rainfall, especially during monsoon season. The annual rainfall within the surrounding region is 1,000–2,000 millimetres (39–79 in), which is elevated almost 70% in monsoon season (late July–October). This heavy rainfall is often responsible for rising water levels and intense flash floods. In conjunction with the collapse of a segment of the dammed Chorabari Lake in 2013, an intense patch of heavy rainfall led to the historical devastation of rural villages and death of thousands of locals, pilgrims and tourists. These are known as the 2013 Kedarnath flash floods.

== Etymology and names ==
In Hinduism, Mandākinī (मन्दाकिनी) signifies 'the river of the air or heaven'. As coined within the Vāyu Purāṇa, this name correlates to the Mandakini's high elevation and its course through significant spiritual locations.

Within Shilpa shāstra (ancient Hindu texts referring to the arts and their standards within Indian culture), Mandākinī translates to 'slow' and refers to an illustration of Mandākinī-śruti, an ancient example of Indian religious iconography. Her shapely beauty and flowing scarf are often seen in relation to the natural flow of the river. The items being held, particularly the vīṇā, are significant symbols within Hinduism.

In Purāna and Itihāsa (ancient Indian literature; commonly associated with legends and Indian lore), Mandākinī refers to the 'river which emerges from the holy mountain'. This is referring to Kulaparvata in Bhārata, a region south to the South of Hemādri.

In Marathi-English, Mandākinī translates to 'the milky way' or 'the galaxy'.

In Sanskrit-English the Mandakini is called mandāka, which roughly translates to 'the Ganges of Heaven'.

== Ecology ==
The Mandakini basin ranges in elevation from 3,800 metres (12,500 ft) above sea level to approximately 6,090 metres (19,980 ft) at the head of the Chorabari Glacier. Climates are generally cooler than the Indian mainland with maximum temperatures ranging from 30–60 °C (86–140 °F) to a minimum of 0–8 °C (32–46 °F). Humidity is relatively high, especially in the monsoon season (usually exceeding 70%). The region houses very steep valleys and large slopes, which commonly result in great sediment movement and landslides.

== Course ==
With a total length of approximately 80 km (50 mi) between regions Kedarnath and Rudraprayag, the Mandakini stretches past many significant locations of Uttarakhand. It also acts as a means of direction for passage through that particular area of the Garwhal Himalayas. Due to great variety in weather and geographical conditions, such as the melting and reforming of the surrounding glaciers, discharge of the Mandakini fluctuates greatly throughout the year. For these reasons, yearly discharge for the Mandakini has been split into two categories: average monsoonal discharge and average daily discharge. This also charts the temperature and sediment levels of the water. The highest discharge recorded (in 2018) was between 6 and 12 m^{3}/s (210 and 420 cu ft/s) observed from June to September with the average daily rainfall being 120–150 mm (4.7–5.9 in).

=== Sources ===
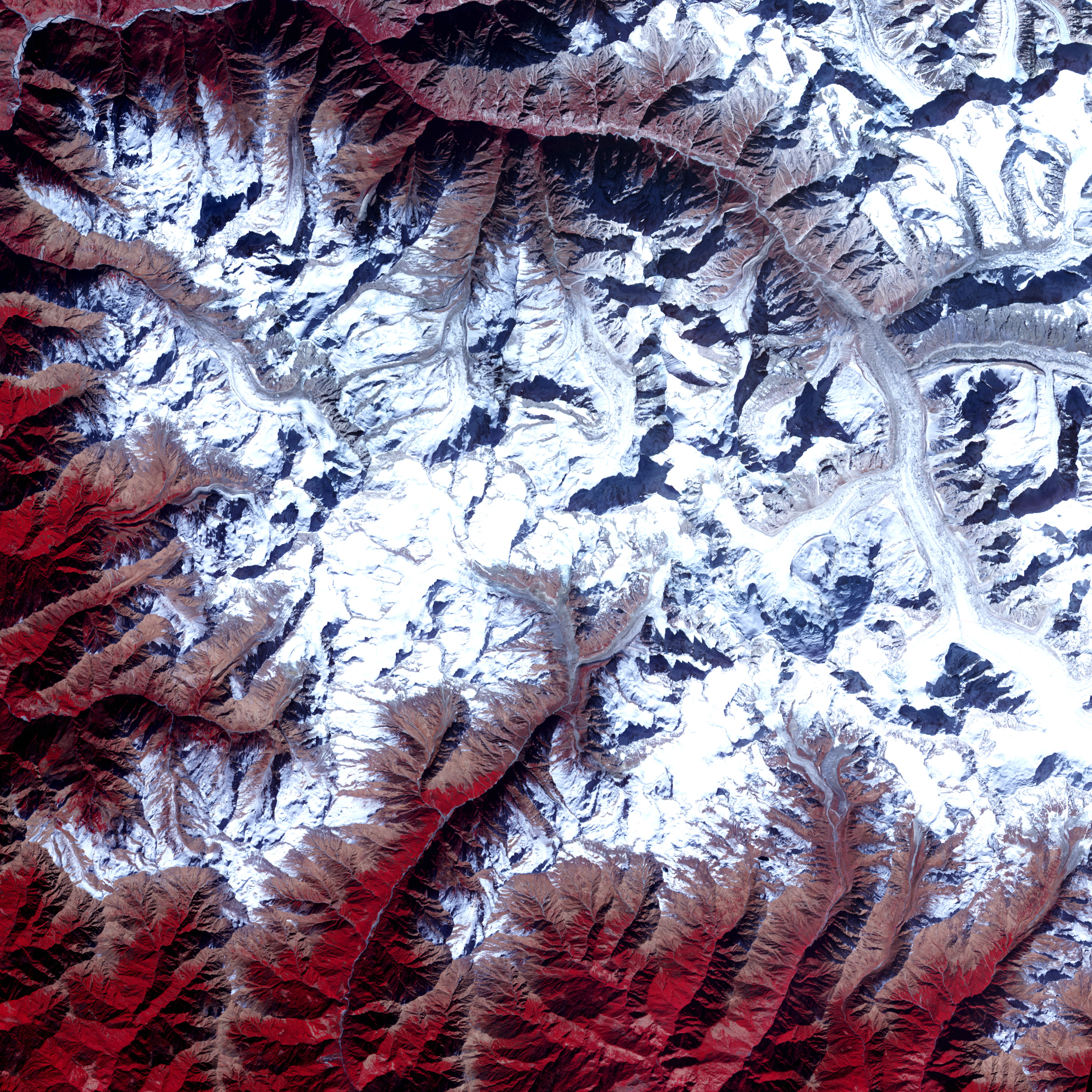
Satellite image of Chorabari Glacier showing Mandakini flow

The Mandakini's single source is the Chorabari Glacier. Chorabari is a medium-sized valley-type glacier that covers an area of approximately 6.6 km^{2} (2.5 sq mi) within the Mandakini basin. It is also one of the many glaciers nestled in the Himalayan region, which many residents rely on for their water needs. The glacier is between the Kedarnath summit to the north and the town of Kedarnath to the south. In recent years (from data received between 1962 and 2014), however, exposure to higher temperatures and increased human intervention has seen a reduction in landmass of the Chorabari glacier (a loss of 1% of its frontal area and approximately 344 m [1,129 ft] of its length). As a result, the Mandakini river has seen steadily increasing water levels and potential for flash flooding. This also diminishes fresh water supplies for surrounding towns.

== History ==
=== Pilgrimage ===
The Mandakini's rich pious significance dates back to its mention in the Srimad Bhagavad. Its plethora of ancient Hindu temples, including the Jagdamba temple and Shiva temple, also contribute to its holy significance. Over 10,000 pilgrims travel the main 16 km (9.9 mi) Kedarnath trek along the Mandakini every year to reach the Kedarnath temple. The trek can be completed on foot or on a mule's back for a small fee. Longer treks along the basin are also offered for locals and experienced tourists. These extend to the shrine of Tungnath and retrace the footsteps of important Hindu sages such as Swami Rama and Bengali Baba. People have also been known to bathe in the river during various religious events such as baptisms.

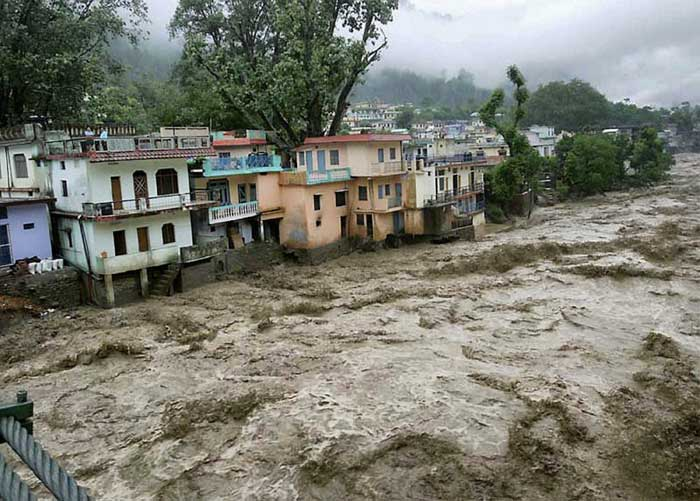
Kedarnath flash floods damaging houses along its banks

=== 2013 flash floods ===
On June 16–17, 2013, unprecedented rainfall and damage to dammed areas of the Chorabari glacier caused the Mandakini and its tributaries in the Garwhal Himalaya to flood and subsequently devastate surrounding villages. The onslaught of water then caused large-scale landslides in the area. 137 separate incidents of 'flash-flood induced debris' were charted within the Kedarnath valley. Downstream settlements such as Kedarnath (3,546 m [11,634 ft] a.s.l.), Rambara (2,740 m [8,990 ft] a.s.l.) and Gaurikund (1,990 m [6,530 ft] a.s.l.) were the most heavily impacted due to an accumulated debris buildup from damaged villages upstream, creating a 'snowball effect' of devastation. During the floods, the main channel of the river increased approximately 406% with about 50% (7 km [4.3 mi]) of the single pedestrian route (14 km [8.7 mi]) between Gaurikund and Kedarnath being completely washed away. As a result, rescue operations were impeded, and evacuation was unable to be effectively completed. Over 1000 deaths of tourists, pilgrims and locals were recorded in the following months. Approximately 120 buildings were destroyed; 90 of these were surrounding the Kedarnath shrine and within Rambara, a small village downstream. While numerous homes and farms were destroyed in the floods, the majority of shrines and the Kedarnath temple were left intact. Locals were seen trekking to the temple and praying only days after the disaster. Pilgrims and locals reported "black clouds" and "black water" taking over the land and the skies on the day of the flooding.

It is theorised that increased construction of hydropower projects, exponential growth in tourism and a steady increase in emission of greenhouse gases all contributed to the disaster. Thus, members of the Kedarnath natural council have made efforts to recuperate areas of the land. Some methods include conservation plans, wildlife sanctuaries and the strategic placement of concrete blocks to restore the original and favoured course of the river.

== Environmental impacts ==
=== Geography ===
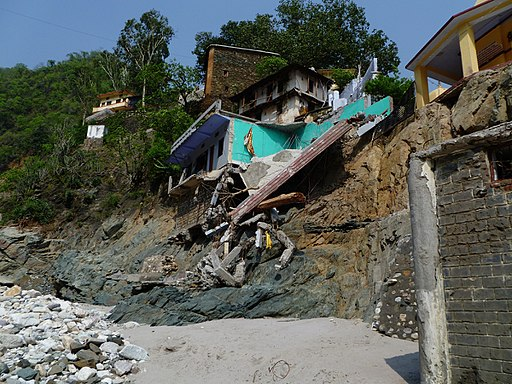
Image of collapsed bridge over Mandakini due to erosion of soil

Because of the altitudinal variation of the Mandakini (altitude ranging from 210 to 7,187 m [689 to 23,579 ft] a.s.l), climate conditions vary throughout the region. A general increase in temperatures, which scientists from the Department of Water Resources Development and Management, Indian Institute of Technology, Roorkee, India, attribute to climate change, has been recorded in the area. As a result, soil erosion has increased, and soil productivity has decreased. This has caused more frequent large-scale landslides and the inability for new crops to grow and be harvested. Increased levels of rainfall have also been attributed to climate change, with researchers predicting larger numbers of soil loss occurring over coming years. Studies show that moraine-dammed lakes, which are attributed to the melting of snowcaps and increased rainfall, are also giving rise to lake outbursts and subsequent flash flooding.

The Mandakini region is seismically and ecologically fragile due to its position along a collision zone. Well exposed crystalline rock groups in the Higher Himalayas and surrounding Kedarnath form the oldest crystalline base in the Himalayan region. This rock is highly susceptible to displacement and is also therefore one of the biggest triggering agents to the many landslides in the region.

Constant flooding, particularly following the flash floods of 2013, has seen the decline in forest density along the Mandakini. Data indicate that the area of forest pastures diminished from 1,240.98 to 1,207.80 ha (3,066.5 to 2,984.5 acres) between 2012 and 2013. Hence, soil fertility and diversity in flora and fauna have been in steady decline since 2013. The fragmentation of forest area has also resulted in a loss in land for usage in husbandry, agriculture, and tourism.

The river ecology is also significantly affected by forest fire activity.

=== Human intervention ===
The Mandakini has become a prime location for investigating the impact of waste dumping and tourism on the quality of water. Due to its cultural and religious significance, the Mandakini and neighbouring villages attract thousands of tourists and pilgrims each year. Increased traffic of people, mules and cars has led to an exponential degradation of roads along the river. Many towns are along the banks of the Mandakini and use the river as a dumping source. Populations of these towns are witnessing explosive growth, and many of these inhabitants are below the poverty line. A number of drains carrying wastewater from towns join the river at various points, increasing the pollution load of the river and altering its water quality. Chitrakoot, for example, possesses gutter and sewer lines that are directly connected to the river.

Researchers from the Department School of Environmental Biology A.P.S. University, Rewa, observed high levels of alkalinity (Minimum pH value was 7.23 in Sphatikshila ghat, and maximum pH value was 7.80 in Arogyadham ghat) within the water. The following activities were observed by these same researchers during sampling of the Mandakini at various locations; religious, tourism, bathing, washing, open defecation, cultivation, sand, stone and gravel recovery, stone crushing, road construction, mining, cremation; fishing, surface drainage, irrigation, drinking water, rafting, and interacting with wildlife habitats. Garbage from religious practice such as Hawan is also thrown into the river. The towns of Chitrakoot, Rambara and Kedarnath have also been known to cover river banks in concrete for the construction of fisheries and docks. This has disturbed the natural flow of the river and caused further soil erosion.

== See also ==
- Badrinath
