= Gauri Kund =

Religion
- Affiliation: Hinduism

Location
- Location: Uttarakhand, India
- State: Uttarakhand
- Country: India
- Interactive map of Gauri Kund
- Coordinates: 30°38′N 79°1′E

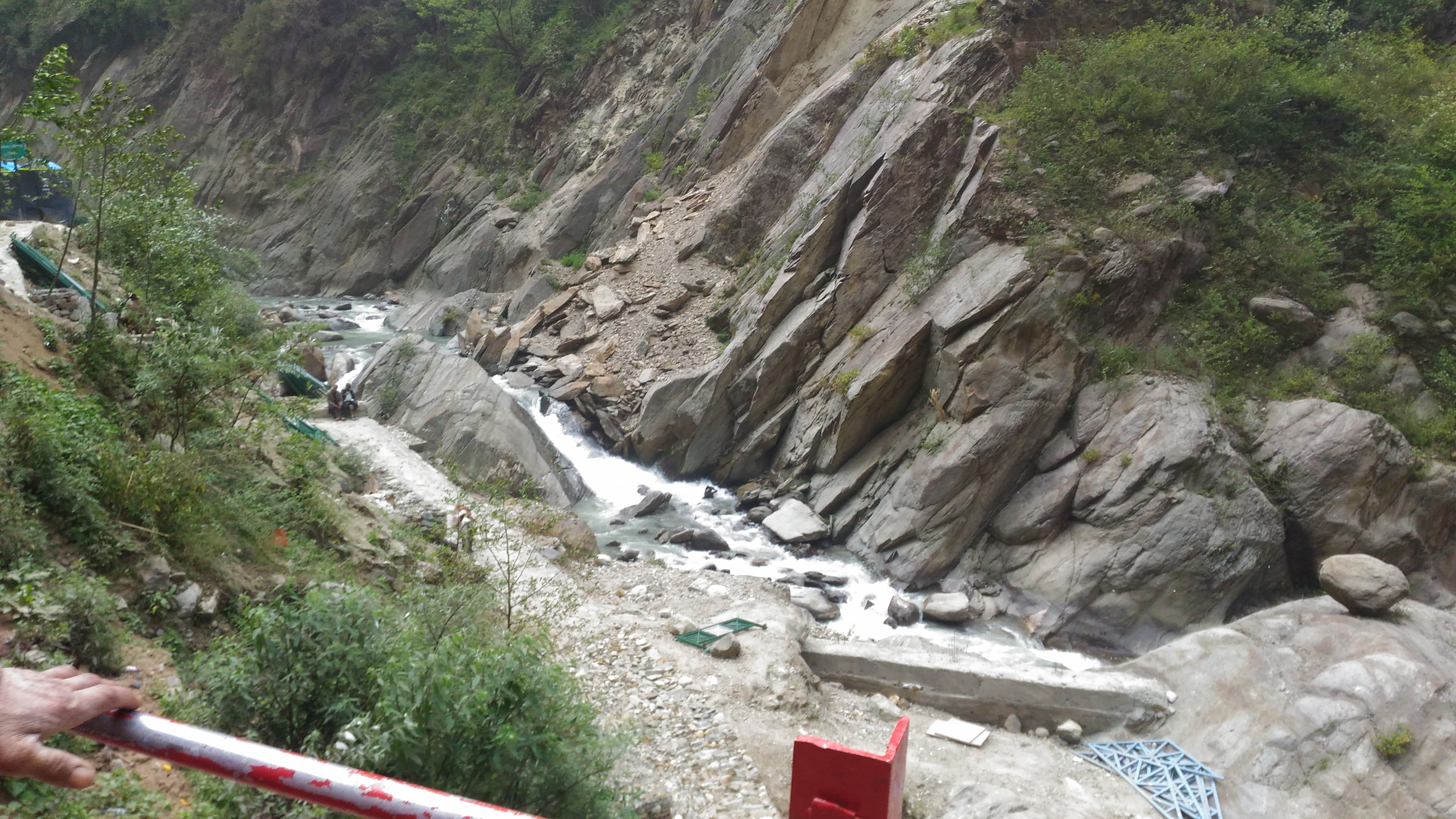
Starting point to Kedarnath yatra on the Gauri kund trail

Gauri Kund is a Hindu pilgrimage site and base camp for trek to Kedarnath Temple, in Uttarakhand, India. It is situated at an altitude of 6502 feet above mean sea level in the Garhwal Himalayas. Anekadhangavadeswarar is revered in the 7th century Tamil Saiva canonical work, the Tevaram, written by Tamil saint poets known as the nayanars and classified as Paadal Petra Sthalam, the 275 temples reverred in the canon.

== Legend ==
Gauri Kund is associated with Shiva's wife, Parvati, who is also known as Gauri. In Hindu folklore, Gauri committed to penance involving many ascetic and yogic practices to win over Shiva's affections. Local tradition claims that Gauri Kund is the spot where Gauri lived while carrying out these practices and it was here that Shiva finally admitted His love for Her. They were married at Triyugi Narayan, which is located nearby. There are hot springs in Gauri Kund and they are converted to bathing places.

This place is also associated with the legend of how Ganesha acquired his elephant head. While bathing in the kund, Goddess Parvati fashioned Ganesha from the soap suds on her body, breathed life into him and placed him at the entrance as her guard. Lord Shiva happened to arrive at the spot and he was stopped by Ganesha. Indignant at this affront, Shiva cut off Ganesha's head and Parvati was inconsolable. She insisted that the boy be brought back to life and Shiva took the head of a wandering elephant and placed it on Ganesha's body. Parvati had her son back and Ganesha acquired the persona by which he is known all over the Hindu world since then.

== History ==
There are several inscriptions in the temple from historical times. One of the inscriptions states that the son of a Devadasi vowed to kill himself if the temple could not be completed.

== Saints and literary mention ==
Tirugnana Sambandar, a 7th-century Tamil Saivite poet, venerated the deity in one verses in Tevaram, compiled as the First Tirumurai. He is believed to have rendered the verse while he visited the Kalahast temple. As the temple is revered in Tevaram, it is classified as Paadal Petra Sthalam, one of the 276 temples that find mention in the Saiva canon. There is a temple in Kanchipuram, the Anekadhangavadeswarar temple carrying the same name.
