= Chopta =

Coordinates: 29°57′N 79°05′E

- Village
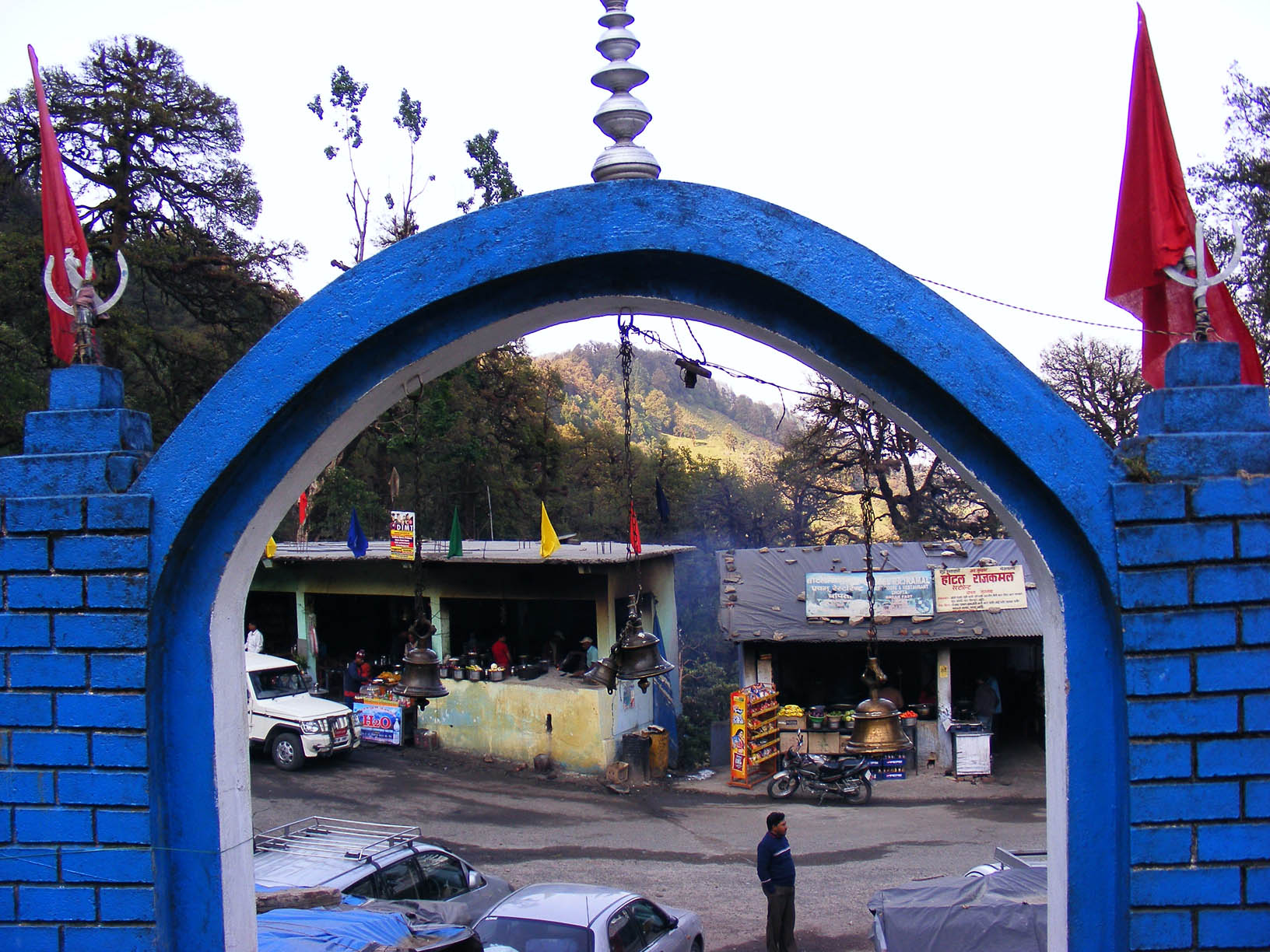
- Chopta, starting point for treks to Tungnath and Chandrashila.
- Interactive map of Chopta
- Country: India
- State: Uttarakhand
- Division: Garhwal
- Elevation: 2,608 m (8,556 ft)

Language
  - Official: Hindi , Sanskrit
  - Native: Garhwali

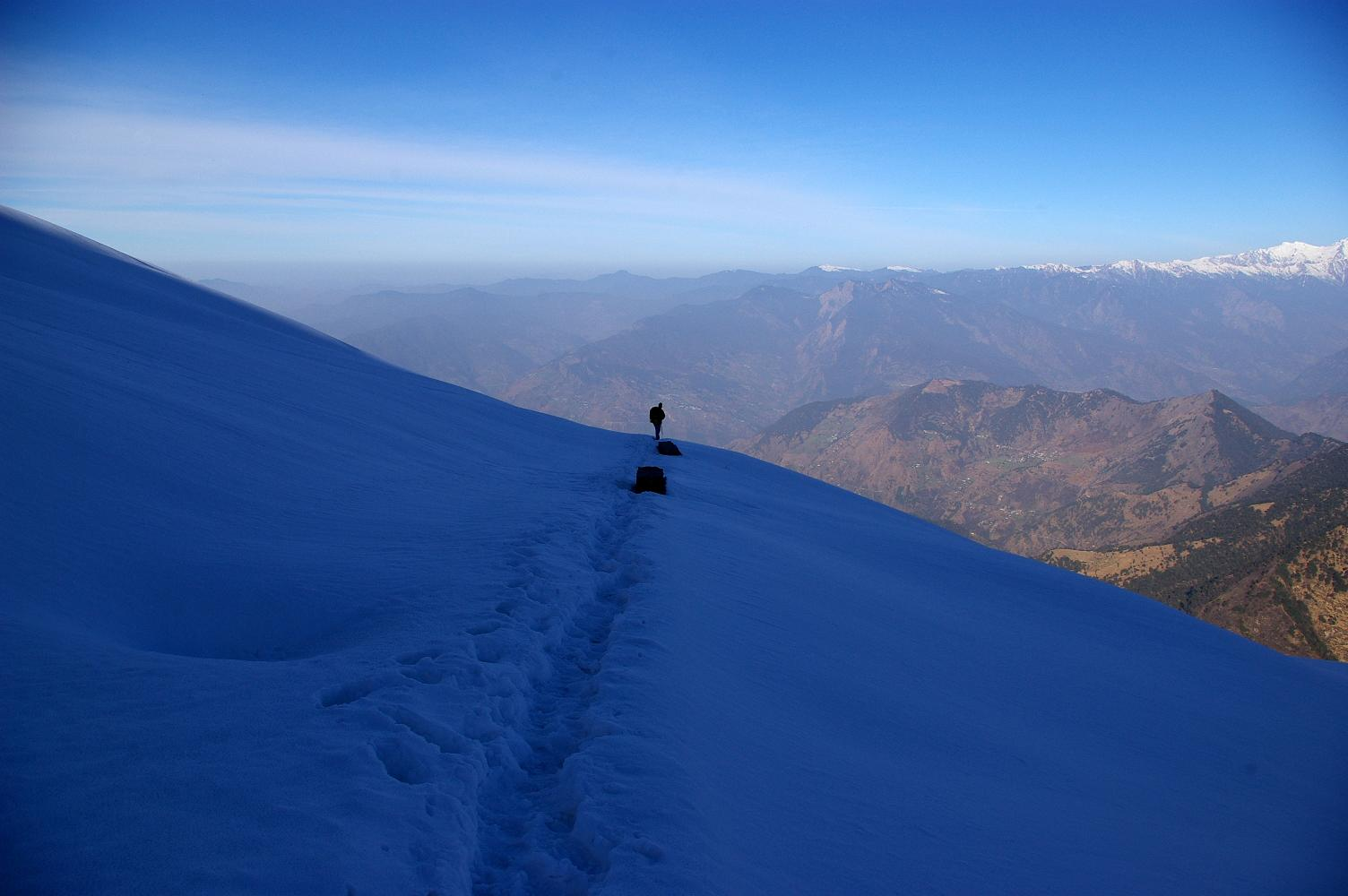
The route to Chandrashila; snowfall at Chopta

Chopta is a small region of meadows and evergreen forest area, a part of Kedarnath wildlife sanctuary located in Uttarakhand state, India and a base for trekking to Tungnath, the third temple of Panch Kedar which lies 3.5 kilometres (2.2 mi) away. Located at a distance of 1.5 kilometres (0.93 mi) from Tungnath is Chandrashila, a summit rising to over 4,000 metres (13,000 ft).

Chopta is an unspoiled natural destination lying in the lap of the Uttarakhand Himalayas and offers views of the imposing Himalayan range including Trishul, Nanda Devi and Chaukhamba. It is located at an elevation of 2,709 metres (8,888 ft) above sea level. Chopta village is surrounded by forests of pine, deodar and rhododendron and is rich in flora and fauna include rare species of birds and musk deer.

== Location ==
It lies 45 km from Ukhimath, 162 kilometres (101 mi) from Rishikesh and approximately 450 kilometres (280 mi) from the capital Delhi. Chopta is also a popular destination during the winter months due to the snowfall that the area experiences. Tungnath temple and Chandrashila are covered with snow from December to March. Chopta can be reached from Rishikesh via Rudraprayag, Kund, and Ukhimath or via Rudraprayag, Karnprayag, Chamoli, Gopeshwar, and Mandal.

Chopta is accessible via the road connecting Gopeshwar and Guptkashi, offering views of the surrounding Himalayas.

== Activities ==
The Chopta - Tungnath - Chandrashila trek is a destinations for trekkers. The Chopta region has many treks and trails cutting through jungles and grasslands. Chandrashilla, Tunganath and Devariyatal are the best known trekking routes in the Chopta region. Because of an abundance of birds, Chopta is popular among birdwatchers.

Activities in Chopta

- Camping and trekking, yoga, survival activity
- Snow trekking, snow skiing
- Rock craft, rock climbing, rappelling
- Photography of rare Himalayan species such as the monal bird, musk deer and pika mouse.

=== Trekking ===
The trek to Chopta, which can be extended to climbing the Chandrashila Peak, is a popular adventure trip among hiking lovers. Since the route lies in a protected area, the journey takes one through enchanting forests with panoramic views of the Himalayas, far from the maddening crowds. The best time to start a trek for Chandrashila peak is in the morning as around afternoon clouds and rain can smudge the beautiful 360 degrees view of the entire Himalayan valley from the peak. The town of Kund in Uttarakhand is the usual starting point and the entire tour can be done in 3-5 days, making it a preferred activity for city dwellers in India seeking a short getaway. The general pit stops are as follows:

- Kund to Deoriatal (3-5 hours trek) - start at Kund, a quaint town situated at 1,350 m, approximately 200 km away from the spiritual town of Haridwar.
- Deoriatal to Chopta (4-5 hours trek)
- Chopta to Chandrashila Peak (4,000 m), via Tungnath Temple and back (4-5 hours trek). The distance from Tungnath Temple to Chandrashila peak is only 1 km and serves as a highlight of the trip. Though the distance is less, it takes time as it is relatively steep.

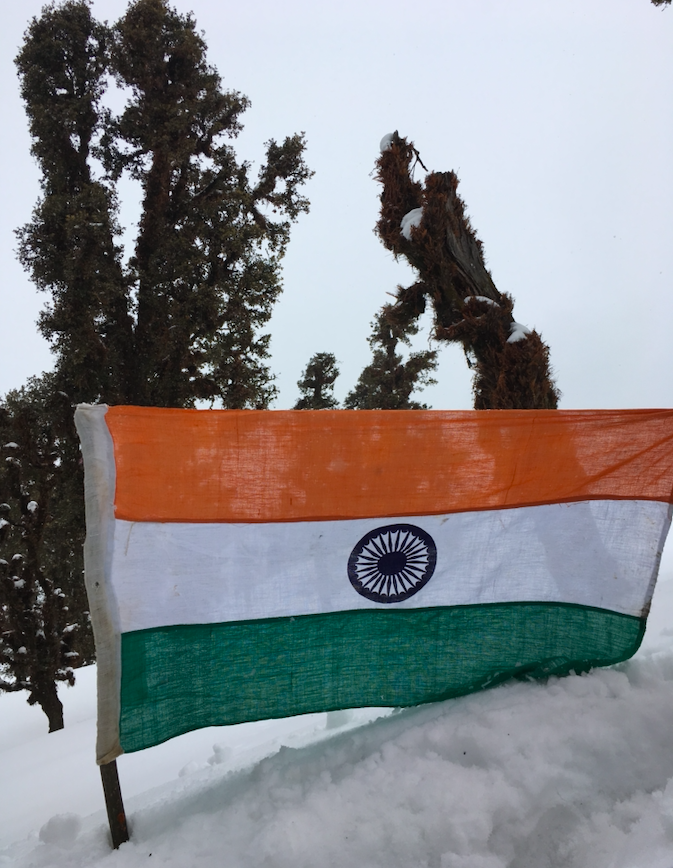
Trekked to Tungnath, Hoisted Indian Flag to show respect to our Motherland & this peak which protects us from the cold Siberian waves.

The return journey from Chopta to Kund can be on foot by retracing the path or in a car.

== Places of interest ==
- Dense forest of Kedarnath Wild Life Sanctuary; where temperate and alpine trees are found in abundance. Trees like, oak, pine, burans and other himalayan species occupy major land part of Chopta, Uttarakhand region.
- Flora and fauna with high diversity
- Grass land patches (Bugyal/ Meadows)
- Chandrashilla peak 4090 m
- Tungnath temple at 3680 m
- Deoria Tal (lake) at 2350 m
- Atrimuni falls
- Visibility of 41 Himalayan peaks - Meru, Sumeru, Ganesh Parwat, Chaukhamba, Bandarpunch, Nilkantha, Tirsuli, Nanda Devi etc. and Panoramic view of Himalayan mountain range.

== Climate ==
Chopta has a very cool and pleasant climate from March to May with the temperature between 10 °C and 30 °C. After that comes monsoon season that starts from July and ends in October. Chopta witnesses snowfall from November to March and the temperature is between a minimum of −15 °C and a maximum of 15 °C. It starts snowing in the month of November and increases significantly day by day. By January it is a 4- to 7-foot-thick layer of snowfall. It is fully covered with snow during winters and during the same time, some of the routes going to Chopta are blocked. An alternative route to Chopta is from Deoria Tal, which is 10–12 km trek that starts from Deorial Tal. Deoria Tal can be approached from Saari Village.

Summertime in Chopta does not offer clear view of Himalayas due to cloudy weather from June to August. All the peaks are covered in clouds and the view is unclear. During winters, the sky is clear and all the mountains are visible.

== Sanitation ==
In September 2020, the Uttarakhand state's tourism department, as part of an initiative, decided to provide mobile toilets in tourist spots lacking this facility. One such toilet is to be built in Chopta-Tungnath.

== Gallery ==
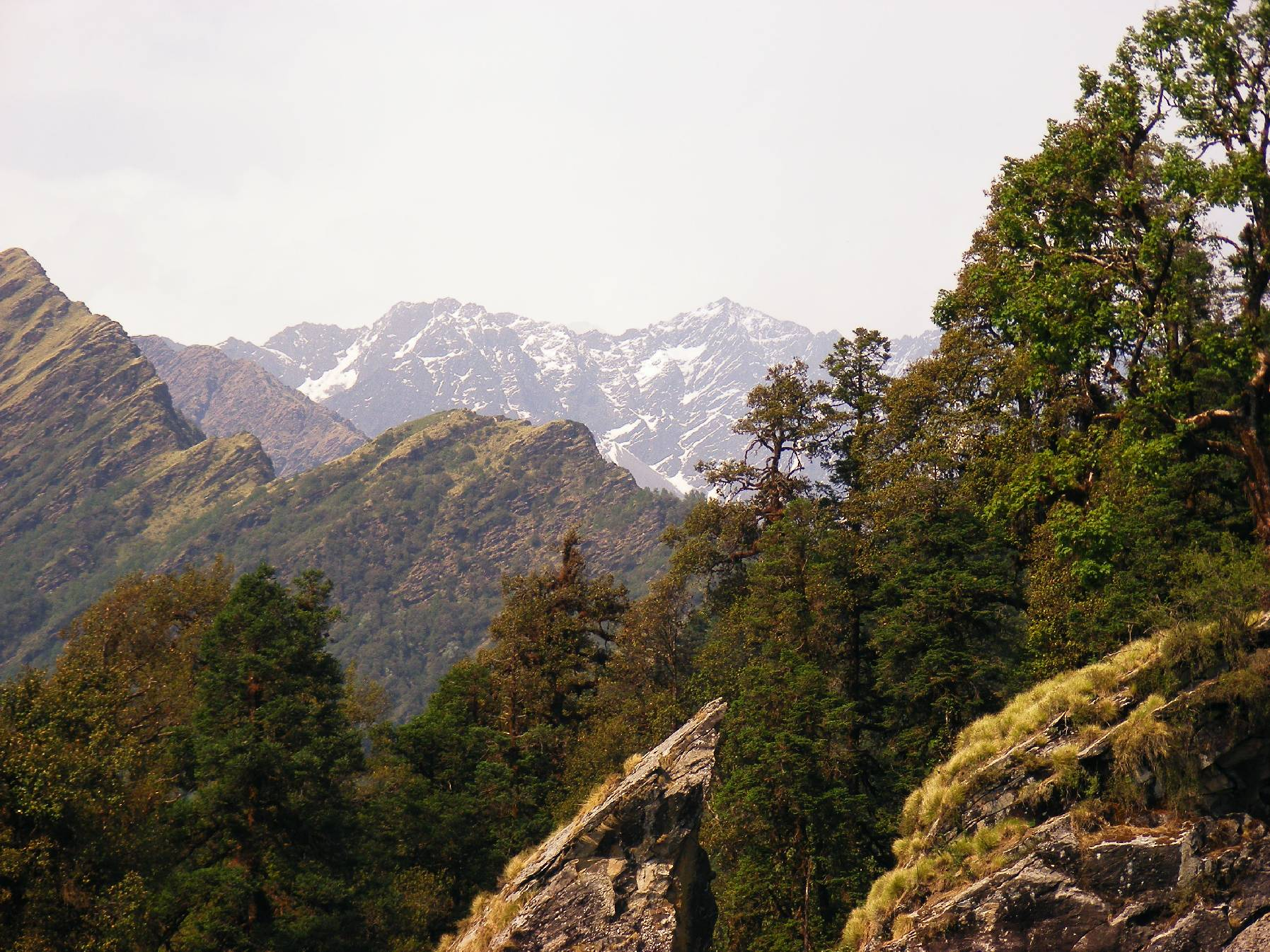
Snow-capped mountains view from Chopta-Tungnath Trek

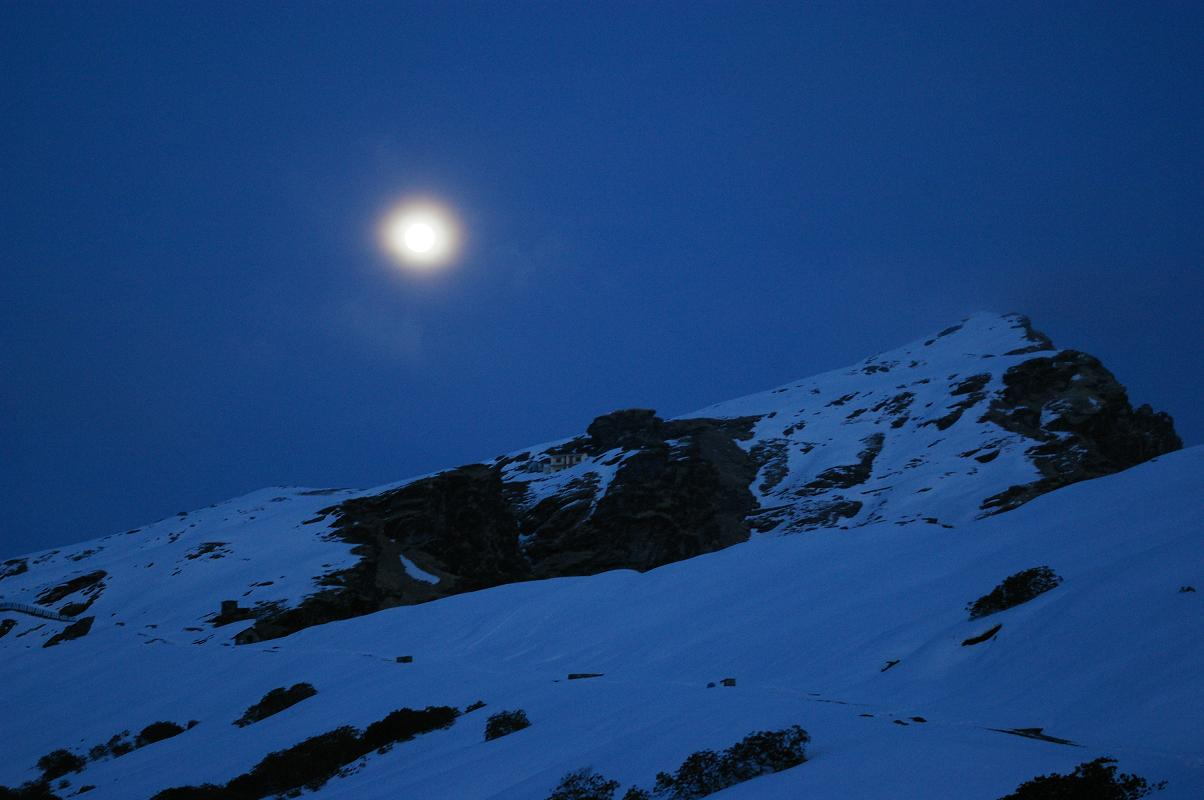
Chandra (Moon) shining over Chandrashila and Tungnath, near Chopta

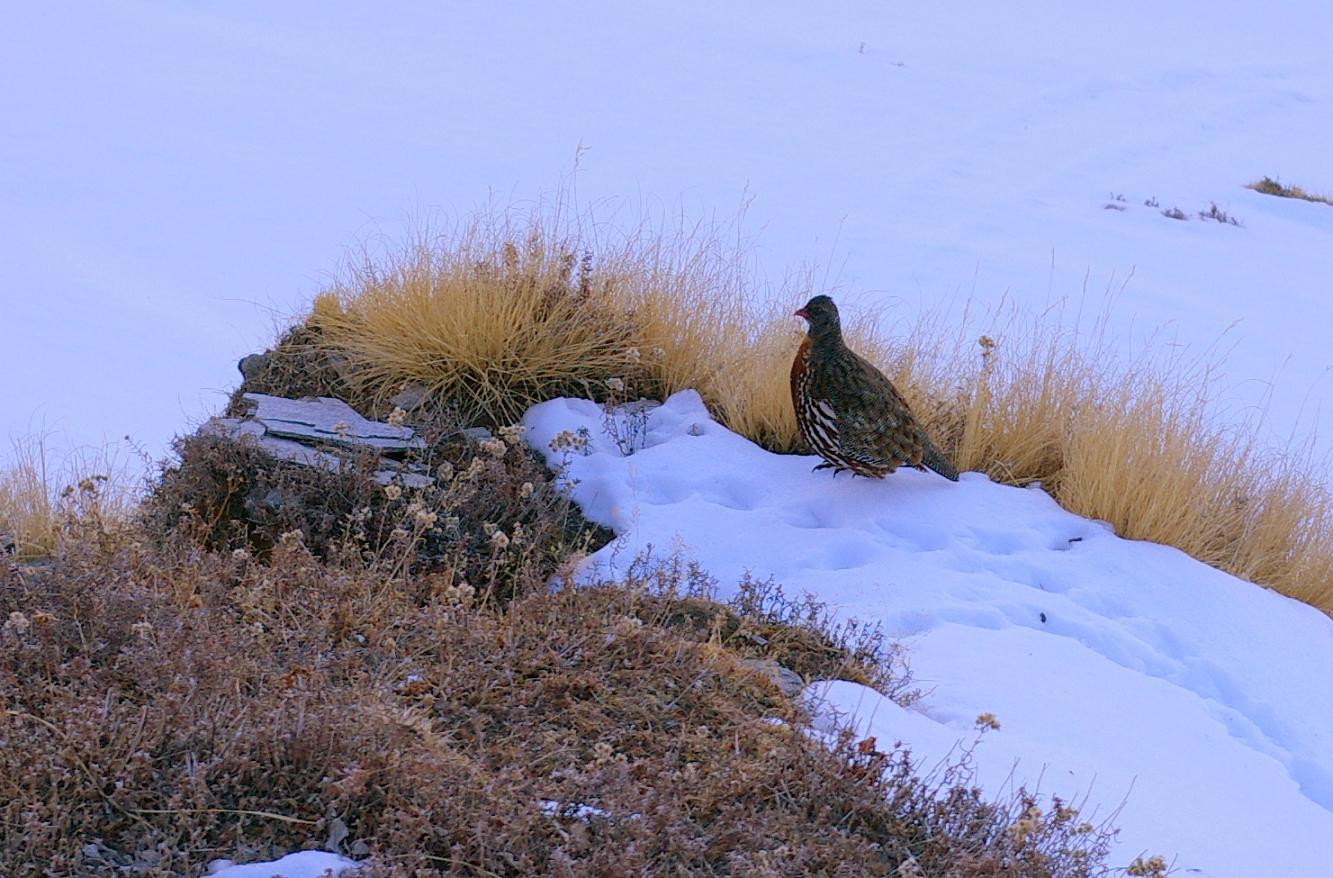
Snow partridge near Chopta

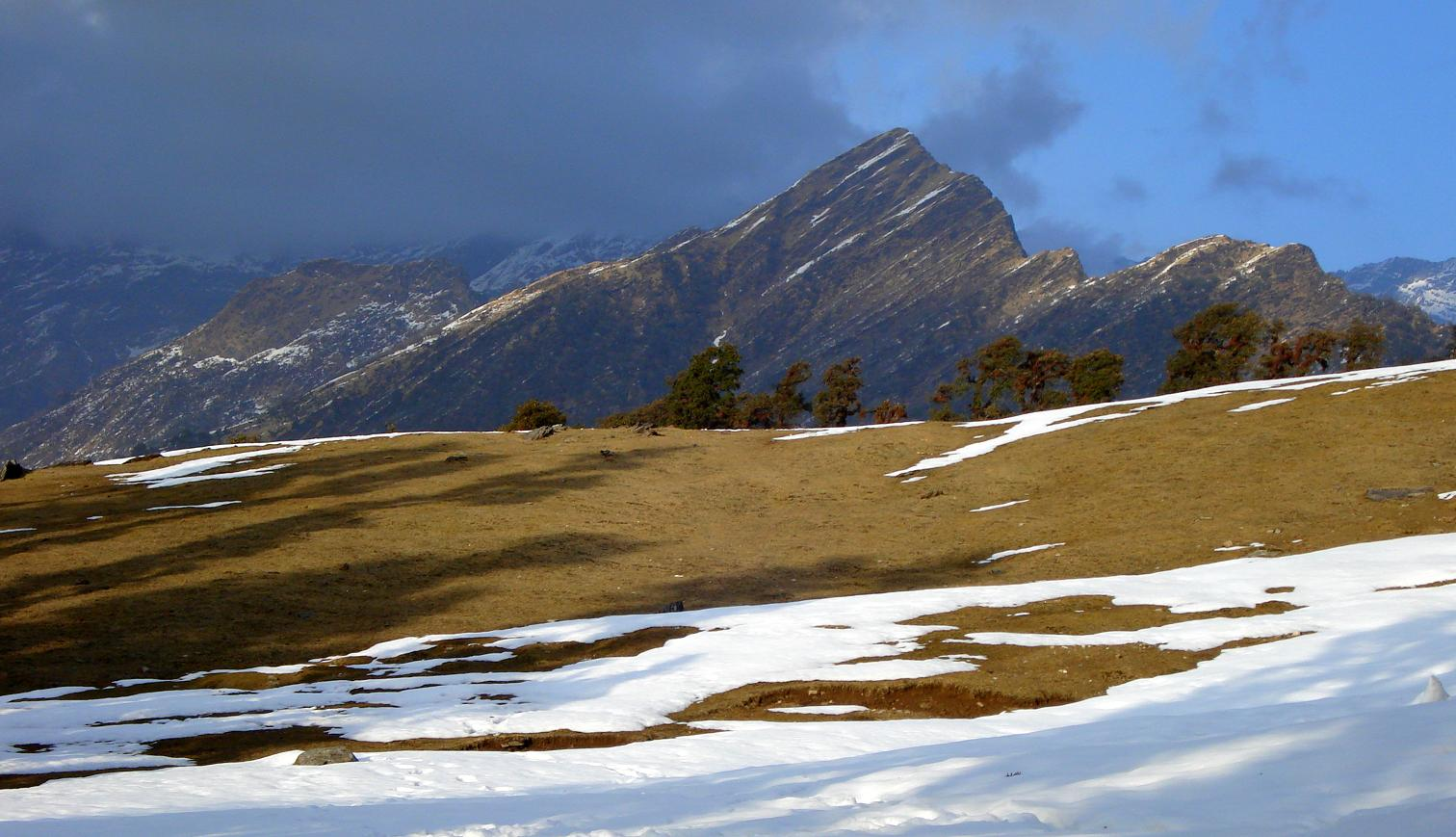
Bugyals (pastures) en route Tungnath from Chopta in evening light

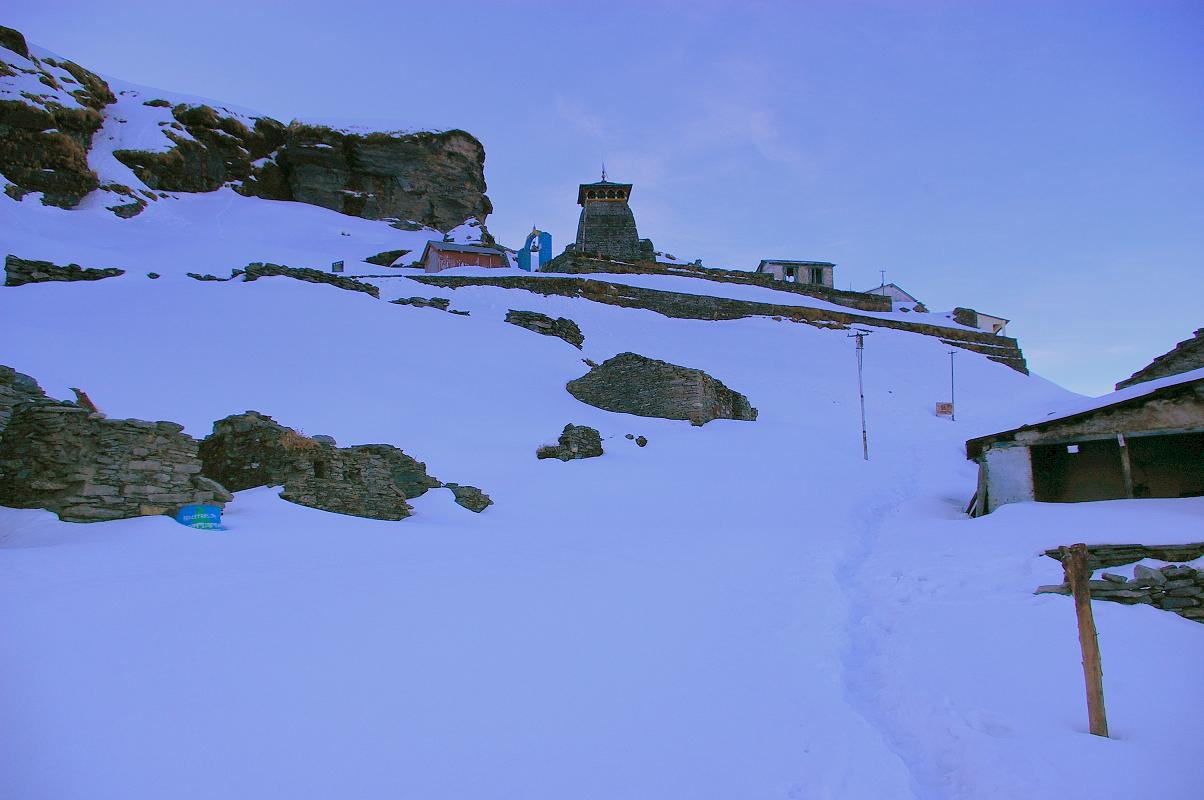
Approaching Tungnath on a winter morning

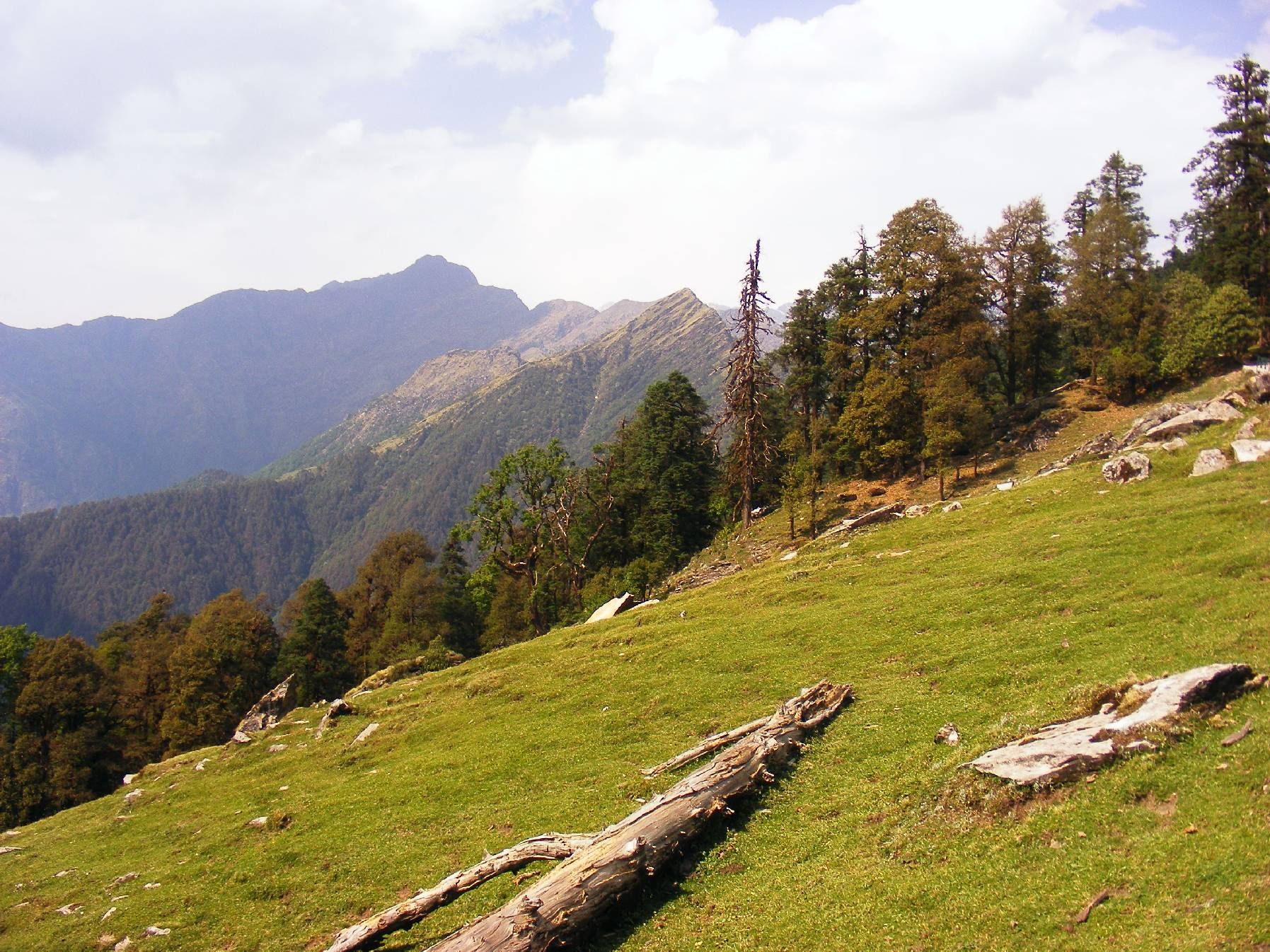
Chopta Bugyal

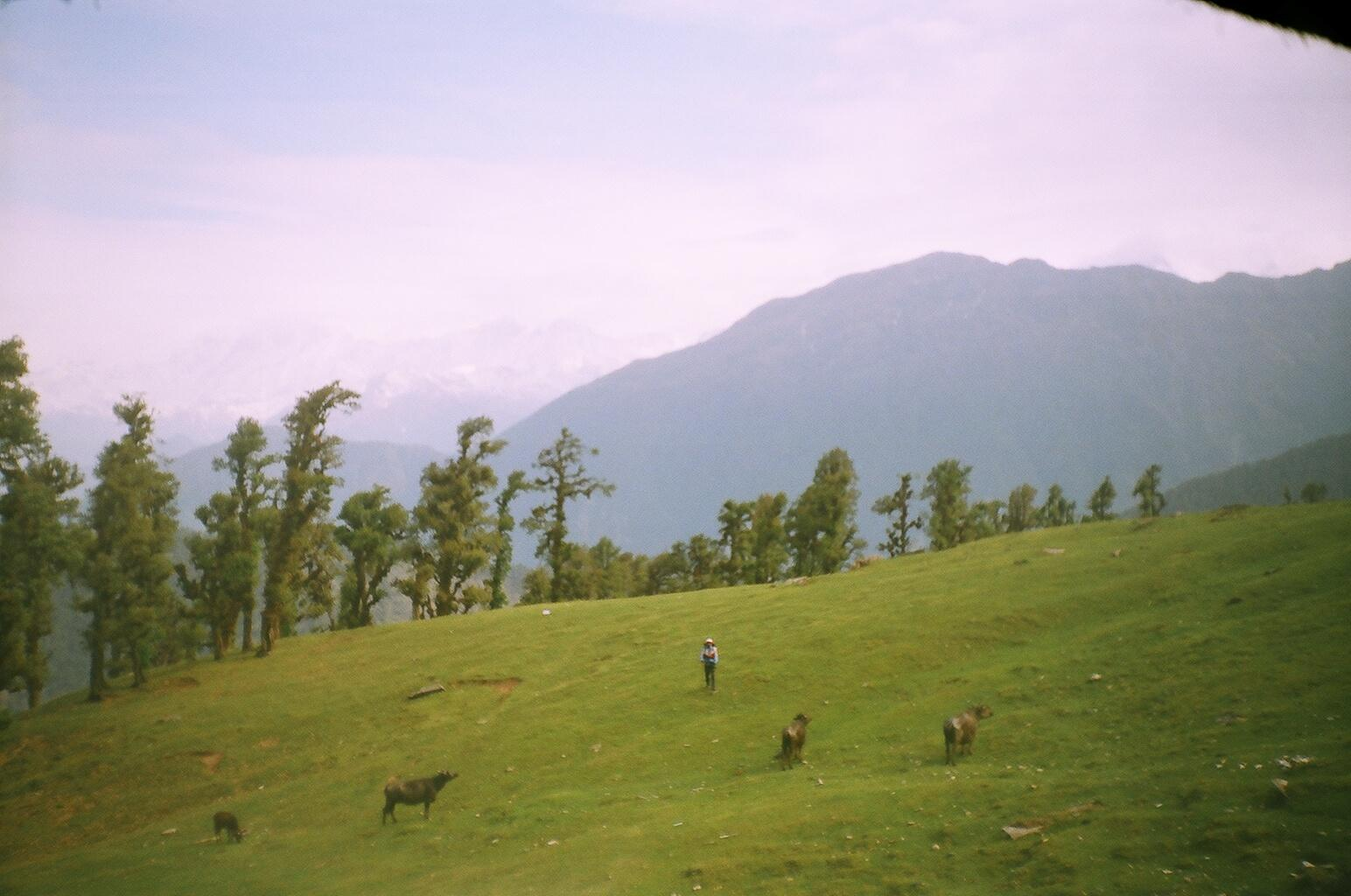
Bugyal on the way to Tungnath

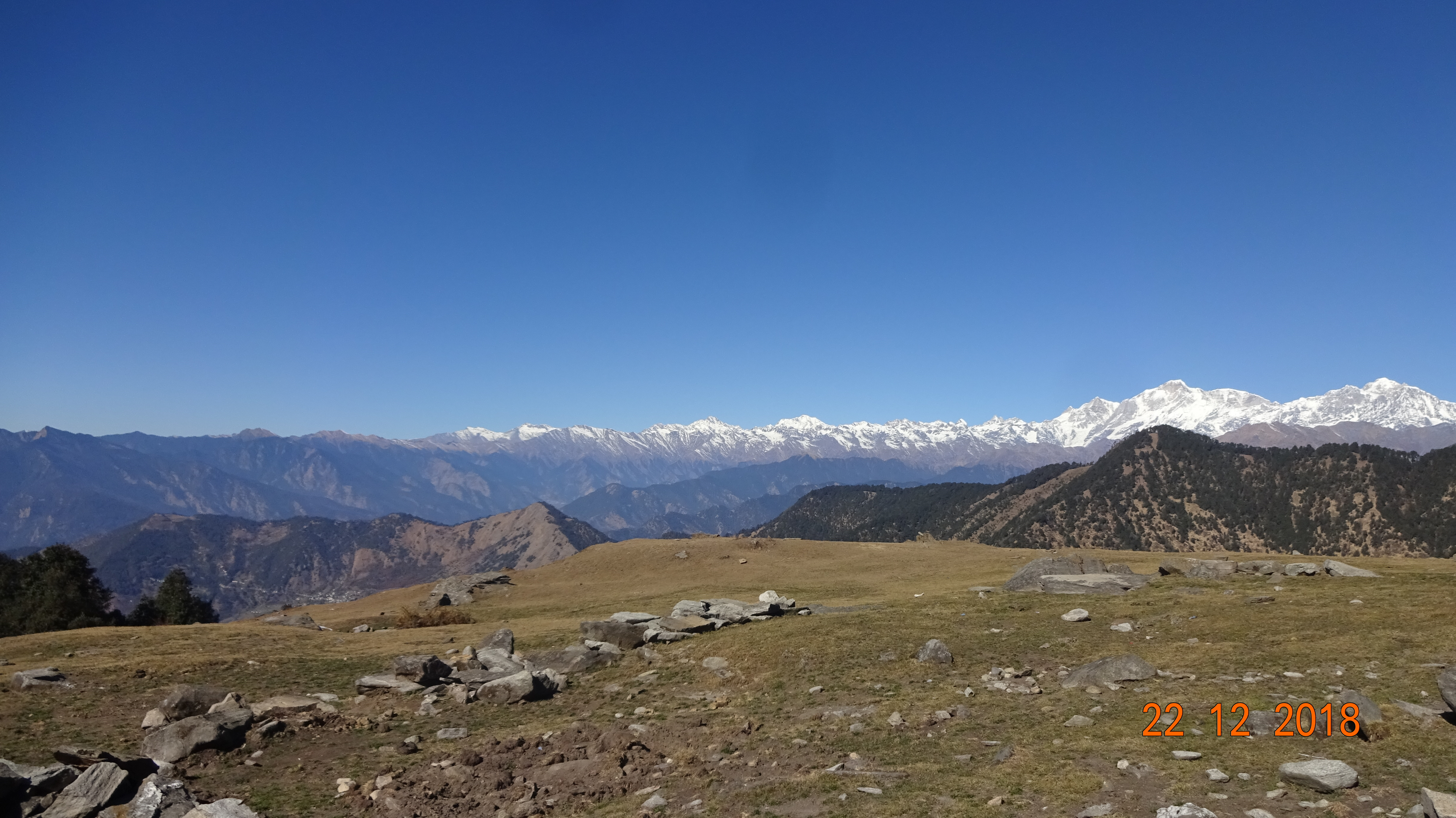
Snow Capped mountains en route to Chopta

== See also ==
- Chandrashila
- Deoria Tal
- Tungnath
- Ukhimath
- Mandal
- Gopeshwar
