= Deoria Tal =

Lake in Uttarakhand, India

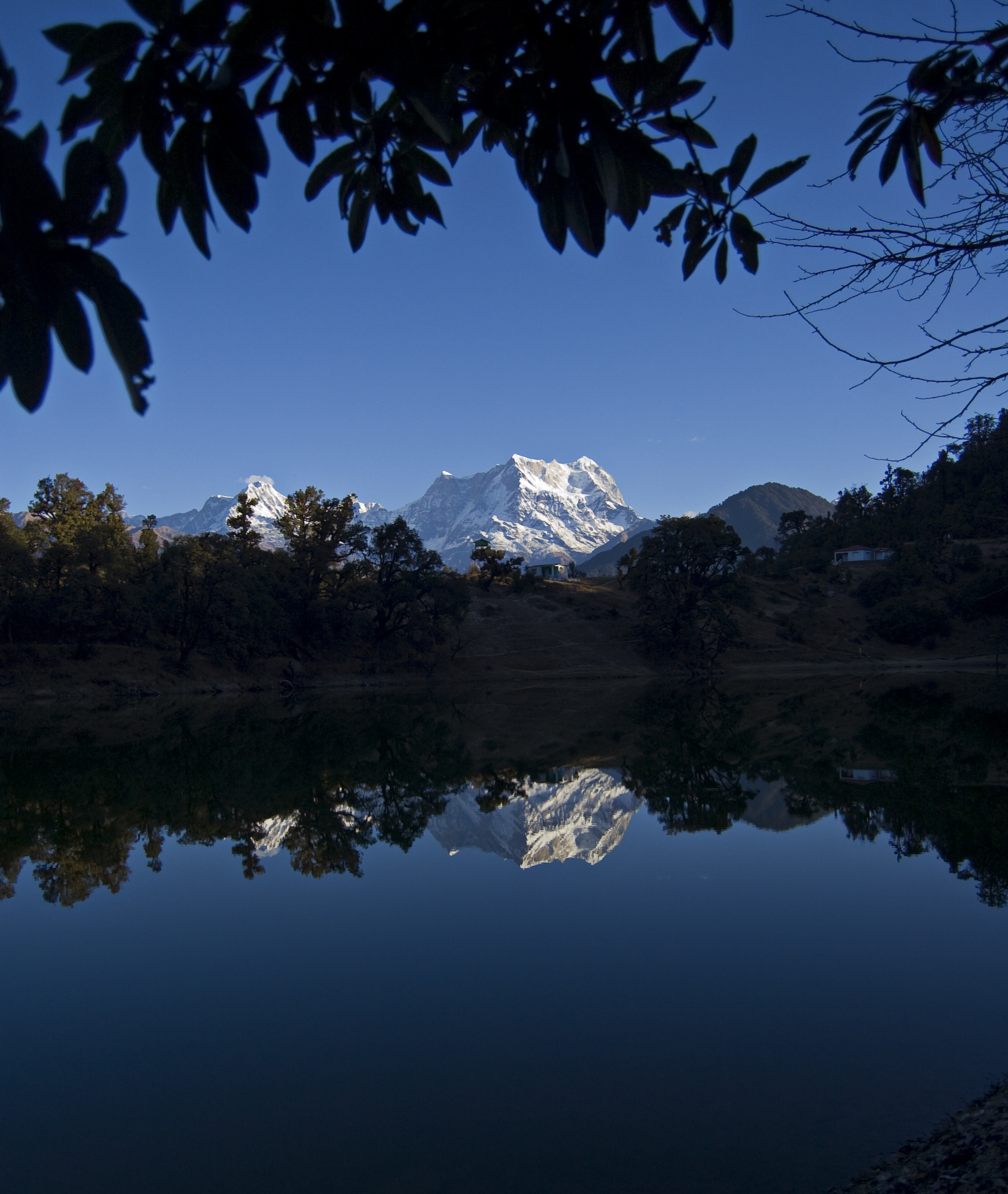
- Reflection of Chaukhamba Peak in Deoria Tal

- Location in Uttarakhand Deoria Tal (India)
- Interactive map of Deoria Tal
- Coordinates: 30°31′20″N 79°7′40″E
- Basin countries: India
- Surface elevation: 2,438 m (7,999 ft)

Deoria Tal (also Devaria or Deoriya) is a lake about 3 km (1.9 mi) from the villages of Mastura and Sari on the Ukhimath-Chopta road in the state of Uttarakhand in India. Situated at an altitude of 2,438 metres (7,999 ft) in the Garhwal Himalayas, it has heavily wooded, lush green surroundings with snow-covered mountains (Chaukhamba being one of them) in the backdrop. It is sacred to the vast population of India, such as the Hindus, Jains, Buddhists and Sikhs and other sects.

== Access ==
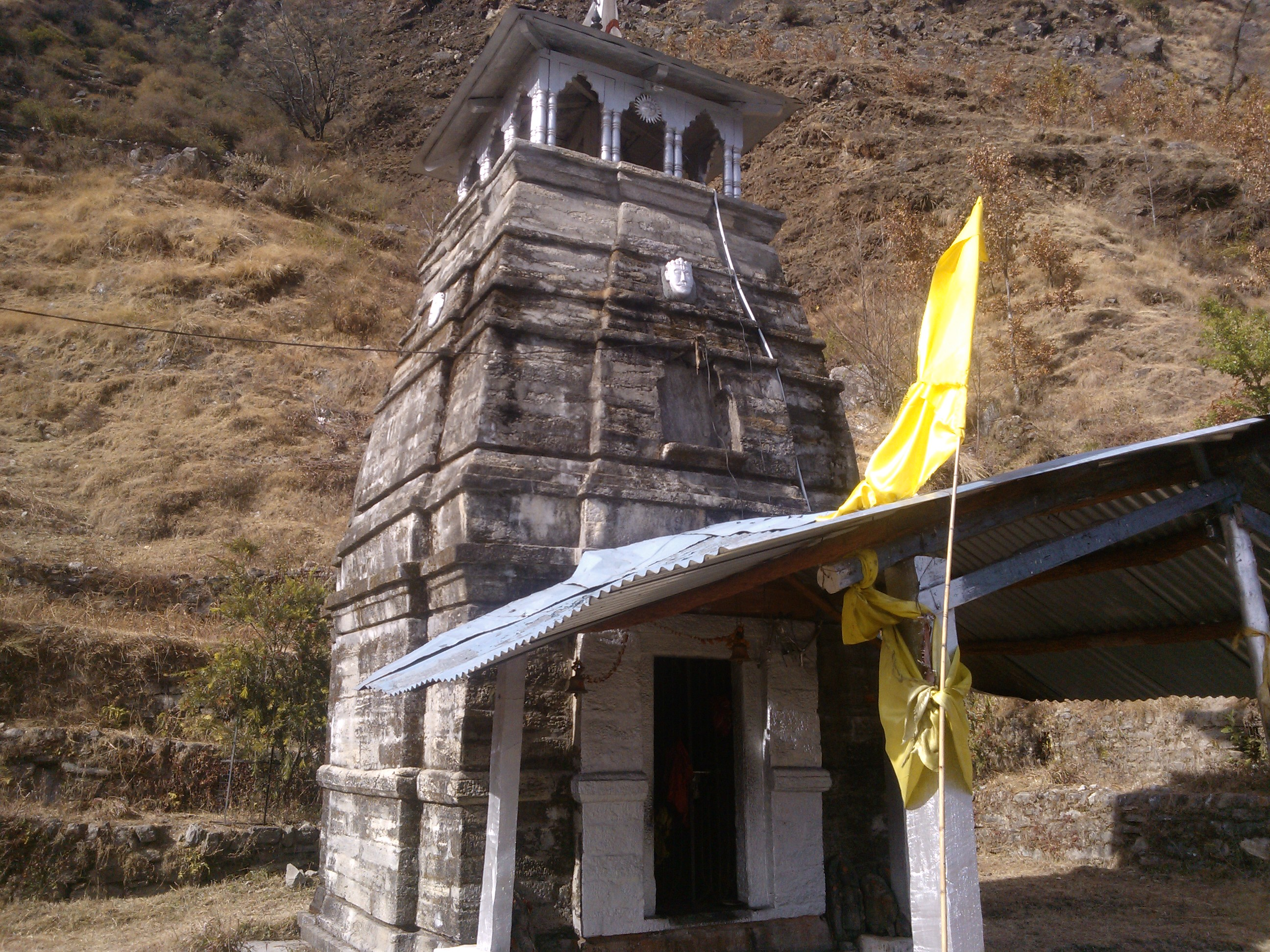
Small temple en route to Deoria Tal

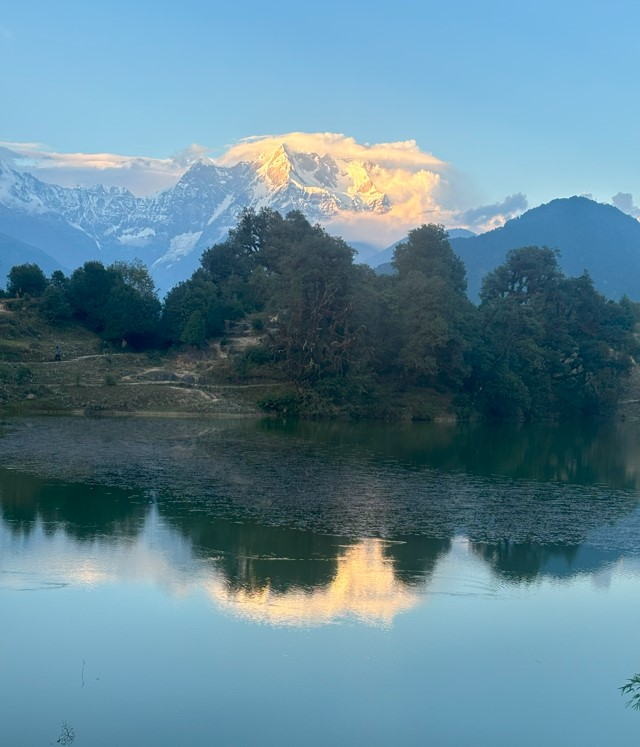
Chaukhamba peak reflection

Deoriatal is primarily accessed from the village of Sari, which serves as the starting point for the trek to the lake. The nearest major transit hub for reaching Sari and the surrounding region is Chopta, a well-connected location in the Rudraprayag district of Uttarakhand. Chopta is accessible by road and can be reached from both the nearest airport, Jolly Grant Airport in Dehradun, and the nearest railway station, Yog Nagari Rishikesh Railway Station. The standard approach route from Rishikesh consists of the following sequence: Rishikesh → Devprayag → Srinagar (Garhwal) → Dhari Devi → Rudraprayag → Kund Bridge → Ukhimath (the final point serviced by regular buses) → Chopta.

Jeeps are available from Ukhimath to reach Sari, a nearby village, via Mastura village. For return journey, one can go down trekking to Mastura to get a shared jeep.

Alternately, one can trek 7 km (4.3 mi) to Deoria Tal from Ukhimath. Even though, trekkers are no longer allowed to camp at the famous Deoriatal, there are options of jungle trekking, videography, etc. There are a couple of shops that sell tea and snacks, but these close at sundown. Trekkers usually combine this trek with the nearby trek to Tungnath (the highest Hindu shrine devoted to Lord Shiva) and Chandrashila, which are approached from Chopta.

=== Panoramic view ===
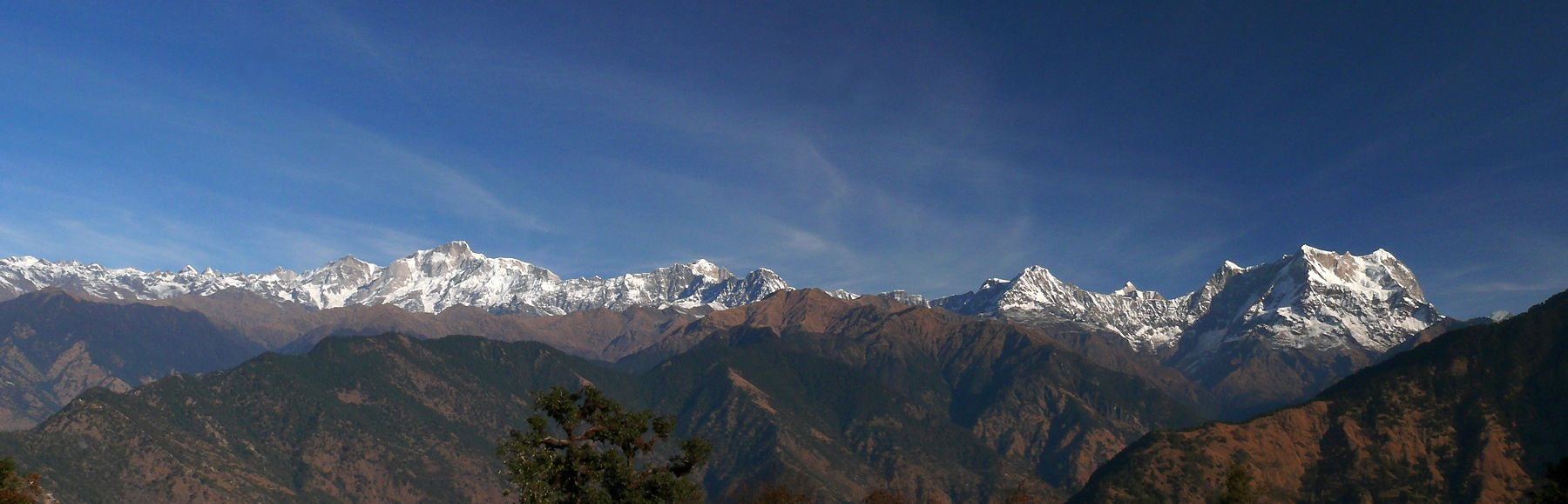
Kedarnath, Chaukhamaba and others Himalayan peak from Deoria Tal. Clicking on a peak in the picture causes the browser to load the existing article about that peak.

The lake is known for its wide 300° panorama. Mountains like Chaukhamba, Nilkantha, Bandarpunch, Kedar Range, and Kalanag can be viewed from here. There exists another route from Deoria Tal to Tungnath, which is mainly used for night camping, jungle trekking, etc.

== In the Hindu faith ==
The Vedic scriptures, sacred to the vast majority of India's population, states that the Devas bathed in this lake, hence the name. The lake is also believed to be the "Indra Sarovar" referred to in the Puranas by wandering Hindu mendicants, Sadhus. It is also believed that it was the place from where the mighty Pandavas were asked queries by Yaksha in a famous anecdote from the Mahabharat. According to the locals it was also said that this lake was built by Bheem, who was strongest among the Pandavas, to appease his thirst, and Yudhister, who was the wisest, suggested Bheem to build his own lake.
