= Chandrashila =

Mountain peak in Uttarakhand, India

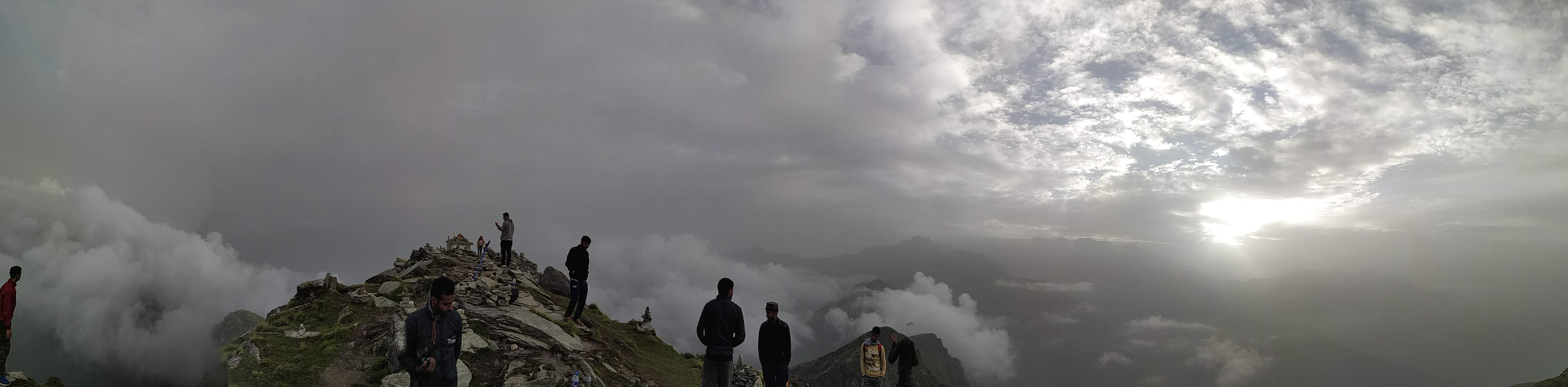

Highest point
- Elevation: 3,690 m (12,110 ft)
- Coordinates: 30°29′17″N 79°13′17″E

Geography
- Location within India
- Location: Uttarakhand, India
- Parent range: Garhwal Himalaya

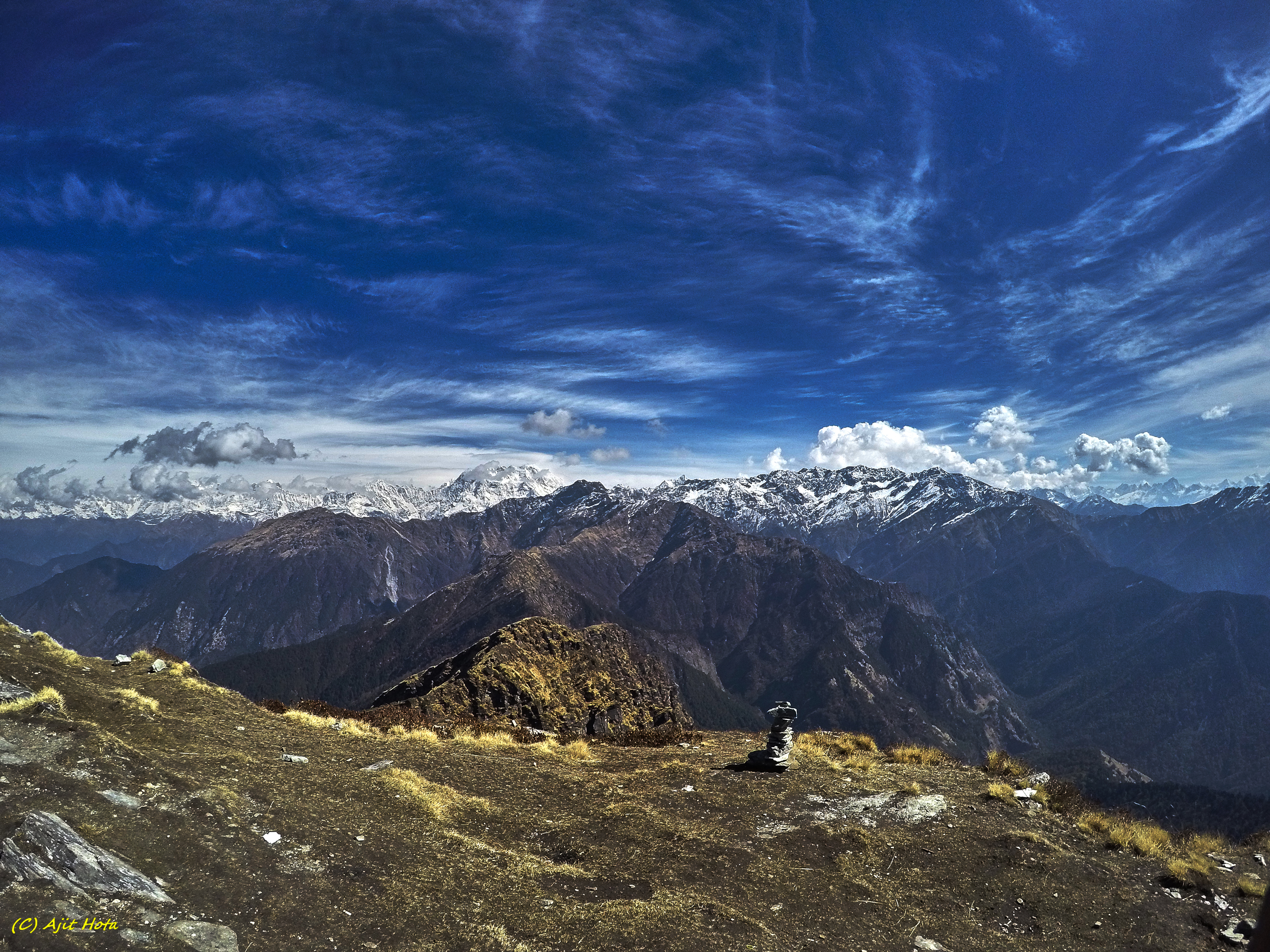
View from Chandrasila Peak

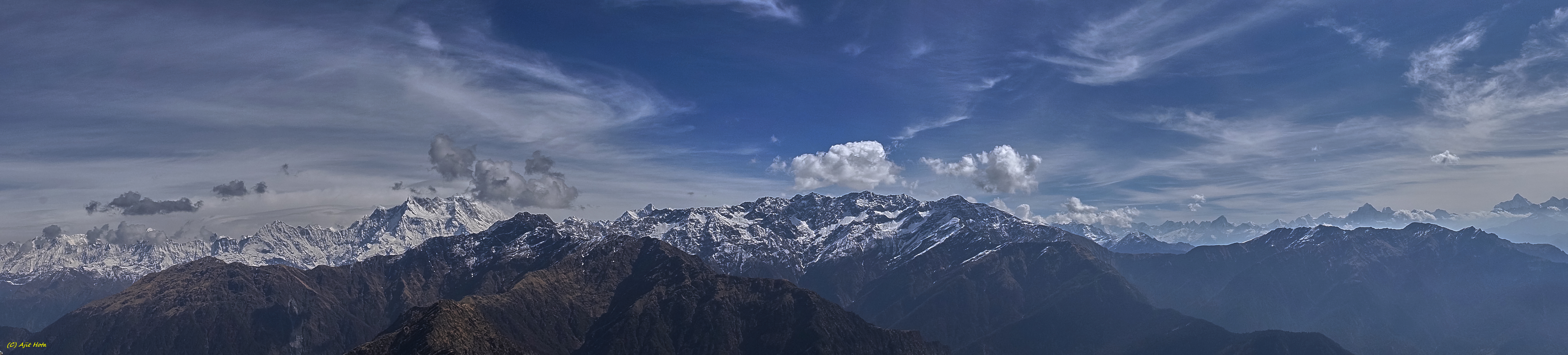
Panoromic view of the peaks from Chandrasila Peak

Chandrashila is the summit above Tungnath temple in India. It literally means "Moon Stone". It is located at a height of about 3,690 metres (12,110 ft) above sea level. This peak provides views of the Himalayas, including Nandadevi, Trisul, Kedar Peak, Bandarpunch and Chaukhamba peaks. There are various legends associated with this place. According to one such legend, this is where Rama meditated after defeating the demon-king Ravana. Another legend says that the moon-god Chandra spent time here in penance.

== Accessibility ==
Chandrashila is accessible only by hiking, while Chopta, a small settlement located nearby, is connected by motorable road and serves as the base point for the trek to Chandrashila. The nearest railway station to Chopta is Rishikesh railway station, situated approximately 209 km away. The nearest airport is Jolly Grant Airport, located about 226 km from Chopta. The usual travel route to Chopta from the nearest railhead or airport passes through Haridwar or Dehradun, followed by Devprayag, Srinagar (Garhwal), Dhari Devi, Rudraprayag, Kund Bridge, and Ukhimath.

=== Trekking ===
After reaching Chopta by road, visitors must undertake a trek of nearly 5 km to reach the summit of Chandrashila via Tungnath Temple. The trekking route extends for about 3.5 km from Chopta to Tungnath Temple, followed by a further 1.5 km ascent from the temple to the Chandrashila summit.

This trek is undertaken throughout the year although during the winter season due to snowfall this trek becomes hard as road to Chopta is closed. Trekkers use a different route during this period (Deoria Tal – Duggalbitta – Tungnath – Chandrashila).

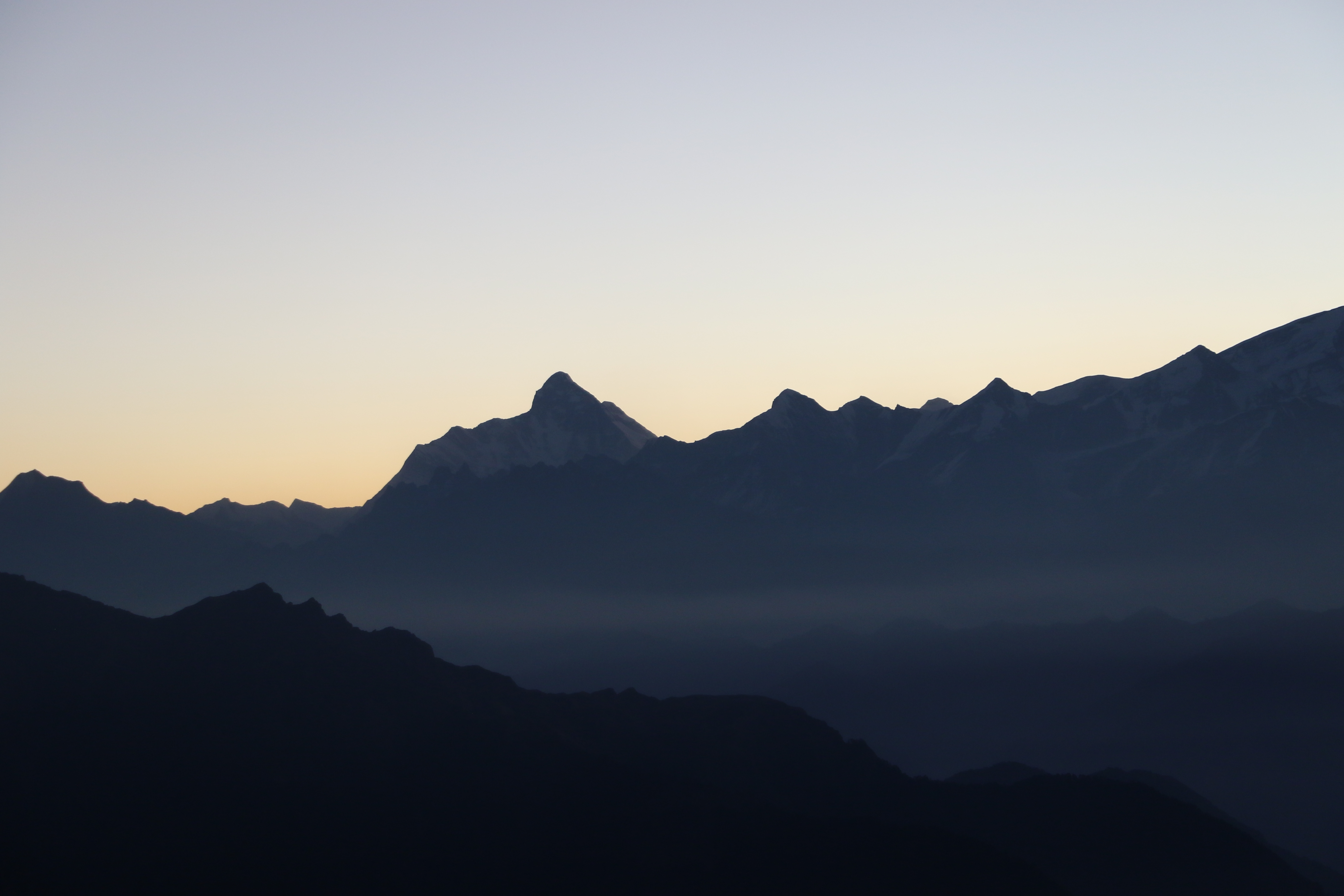
NandaDevi from Chandrashila Pk

== See also ==
- Tungnath
- Chopta
- Panch Kedar
