= Tungnath =

Hindu Temple in Uttarakhand, India

Tungnath Temple
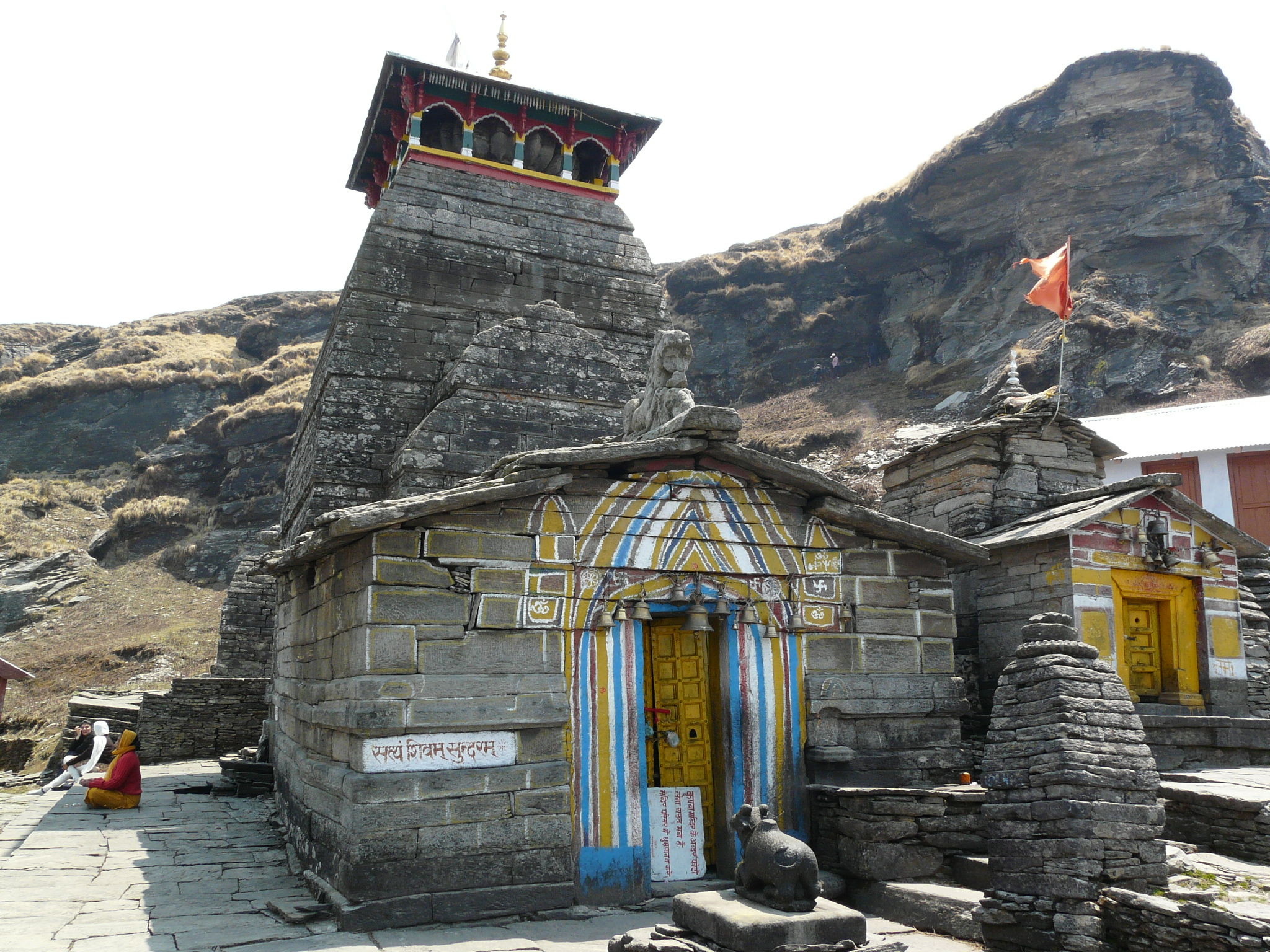
- A view of the temples in Tungnath

- Location in Uttarakhand

Religion
- Affiliation: Hinduism
- District: Rudraprayag
- Deity: Shiva
- Festival: Maha Shivaratri

Location
- State: Uttarakhand
- Country: India
- Coordinates: 30°29′22″N 79°12′55″E

Architecture
- Type: North-Indian Himalayan architecture
- Creator: Pandavas (according to legend)
- Completed: Unknown
- Elevation: 3,680 m (12,073 ft)

Website
- https://uttarakhandtourism.gov.in/destination/chopta

Tungnath Temple (IAST:tuņgnāth) is one of the highest Shiva temples in the world and is the highest of the five Panch Kedar temples located in the Rudraprayag district, in the Indian state of Uttarakhand. The Tungnath (literal meaning: Lord of the peaks) mountains form the Mandakini and Alaknanda river valleys. It is located at an altitude of 3,680 m (12,073 ft), and just below the peak of Chandrashila. It has a rich legend linked to the Pandavas, heroes of the Mahabharata epic.

According to Hindu mythology, Shiva and his wife, Parvati both reside in the Himalayas: Shiva resides at Mount Kailash. Parvati is also called Shailaputri, which means 'Daughter of the Mountain'. Many folk legends related to the Garhwal region, Shiva and the creation of the Panch Kedar temples are narrated in Hindu epic Mahabharata. The Pandavas defeated and slayed their cousins — the Kauravas in the epic Kurukshetra War. They wished to atone for the sins of committing fratricide (gotra hatya) and Brāhmanahatya (killing of Brahmins — the priest class) during the war. Thus, they handed over the reins of their kingdom to their kin and left in search of Shiva and to seek his blessings. First, they went to the holy city of Varanasi (Kashi), believed to be Shiva's favourite city and known for its Kashi Vishwanath Temple. But, Shiva wanted to avoid them as he was deeply incensed by the death and dishonesty at the Kurukshetra War and was, therefore, insensitive to Pandavas' prayers. Therefore, he assumed the form of a bull (Nandi) and hid in the Garhwal region. It is believed to be 1000 years old and in the order of Panch Kedars, it is the tritiya Kedar.

As per the Hindu mythology, not finding Shiva in Varanasi, the Pandavas went to Garhwal Himalayas. Bhima, the second of the five Pandava brothers, then standing astride two mountains started to look for Shiva. He saw a bull grazing near Guptakashi (“hidden Kashi” — the name derived from the hiding act of Shiva). Bhima immediately recognized the bull to be Shiva. Bhima caught hold of the bull by its tail and hind legs. But the bull-formed Shiva disappeared into the ground to later reappear in parts, with the hump raising in Kedarnath, the arms appearing in Tungnath, the face showing up at Rudranath, the nabhi (navel) and stomach surfacing in Madhyamaheshwar and the hair appearing in Kalpeshwar. The Pandavas pleased with this reappearance in five different forms, built temples at the five places for venerating and worshipping Shiva. The Pandavas were thus freed from their sins.

A variant of the tale credits Bhima of not only catching the bull, but also stopping it from disappearing. Consequently, the bull was torn asunder into five parts and appeared at five locations in the Kedar Khand of Garhwal region of the Himalayas (The arms in Tungnath, the hump in Kedarnath, the face in Rudranath, the navel in Madhyamaheshwar, and the hair in Kalpeshwar). After building the Panch Kedar Temples, the Pandavas meditated at Kedarnath for salvation, performed yagna (fire sacrifice) and then through the heavenly path called the Mahapanth (also called Swargarohini), attained heaven or salvation. The Panch Kedar Temples are constructed in the North-Indian Himalayan Temple "Katyuri" architecture with the Kedarnath, Tungnath and Madhyamaheshwar temples looking similar.

Legend also states that Rama, the central character of Ramayana, meditated at the Chandrashila peak which is close to Tungnath, in India. It is also said that Ravana performed penance to Shiva, the lord of the peaks, when he resided here.

== Worship ==
The priest at this temple is a local Brahmin from Makkumath village, unlike the other Kedar temples where the priests are from South India, a tradition set by the eighth century Hindu seer Adi Shankara.

It is also said that the Maithani Brahmins of Makkumath Village officiate as priests at this temple. During the winter season, the temple is closed and the symbolic image of the deity and the temple priests are moved to Markandeshwar Temple in Makkumath village, which is 29 km from here. It is near Duggalbitha 10 km (6 mi) before Chopta towards Ukhimath.

== Geography ==
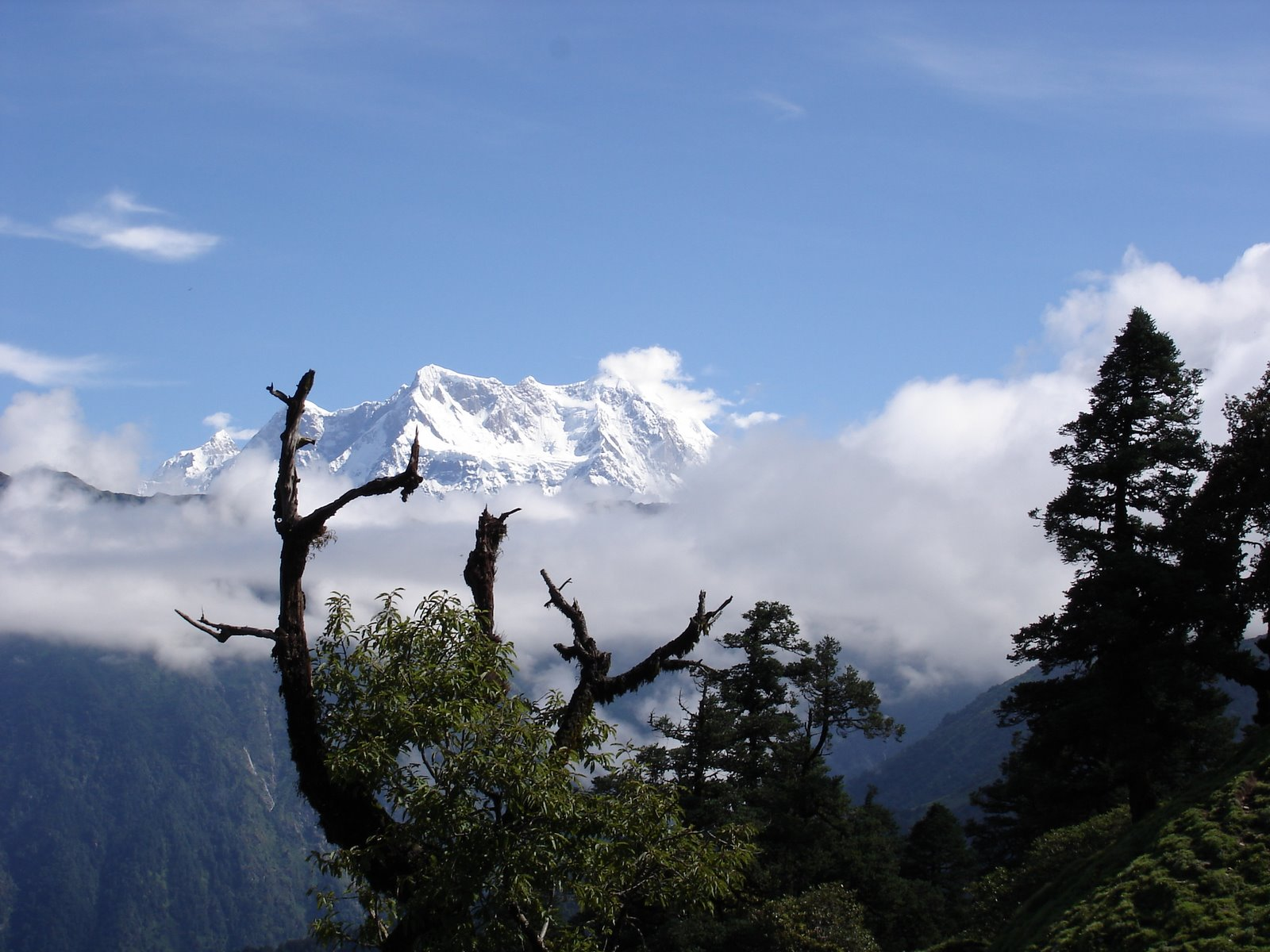
View of the Himalayas from Tungnath

Tungnath is at the top of the ridge dividing the waters of the Mandakini River (raising from Kedarnath) from those of the Alaknanda River (raising above Badrinath). The Tungnath peak on this ridge is the source of three springs, which form the Akashkamini River. The temple lies about 2 km (1.2 mi) below the Chandrashila Peak (3,680 m (12,073 ft)). The road to Chopta is just below this ridge and hence provides the shortest bridle approach path for trekking to the temple from Chopta, over a short distance of about 5 km (3.1 mi). From the top of the Chandrashila peak, picturesque views of the Himalayan range comprising snow peaks of Nanda Devi, Panch Chuli, Banderpoonch, Kedarnath, Chaukhamba and Neelkanth on one side, and the Garhwal valley on the opposite side could be witnessed. The valley between Chopta and Tunganath temple has wooded hills with rich alpine meadows with rhododendron coppices and also agricultural fields. The rhododendrons, when they are in full bloom during March, display dazzling colours ranging from crimson to pink. A high-altitude botanical station of the Garhwal University is located here. Nearing the top of the temple, there is a forest resthouse at Dugalibitta, just opposite to the Kedarnath range of hills. The Kedarnath Wildlife Sanctuary, also called the Kedarnath Musk Deer Sanctuary, set up in 1972 to preserve the endangered musk deer, which lies in the region, also has a musk deer breeding centre at Kharchula Kharak near Chopta.

== Climate ==
Climate is generally cool throughout the year. Summers are pleasant with average temperature hovering around 16 degrees Celsius during the day time. Winters are very chilly and temperature drops below the freezing point very frequently. The best time to visit the temple is from April to September. Due to heavy snowfall, the Tungnath Temple remains closed for around six months during winter.

== Trekking and access ==
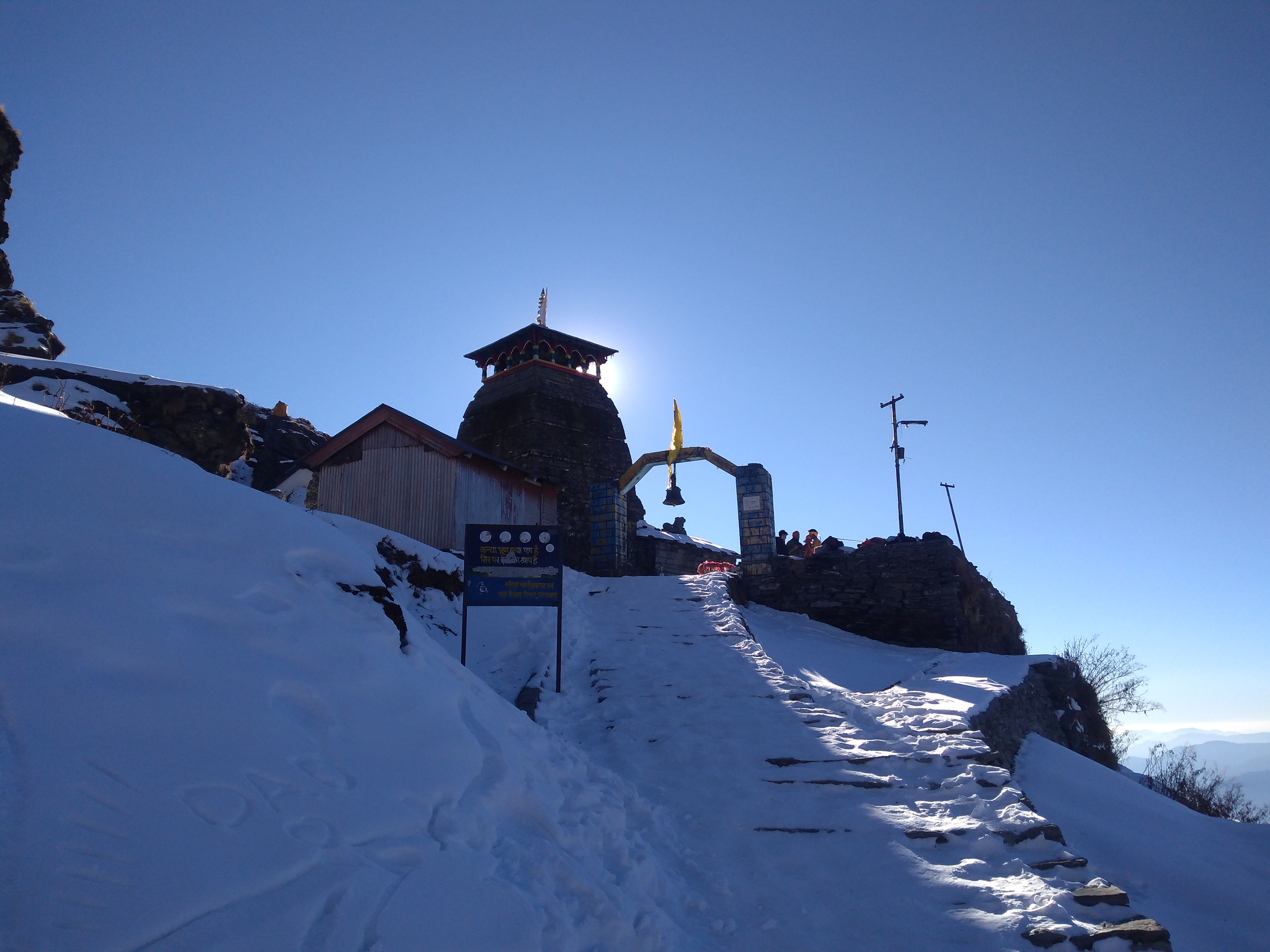
Tungnath Temple in winter

The 5 km (3.1 mi) trek starts from Chopta (9,600 ft (2,926 m)), the nearest place on the NH 58. Chopta is 23.9 km (15 mi) from Rudraprayag towards Karnaprayag and is reached from Rishikesh via Devprayag, Srinagar and Rudraprayag.

Of all the Panch Kedar trek routes, the route to Tungnath is the shortest: only 5 km (3.1 mi) from Chopta (on the Ukhimath-Gopeshwar road) that can be covered in approximately 4–5 hours (depending on the trekker's physical ability). Trek is a steep climb (9,600–11,350 ft (2,926–3,459 m)), the trek path is stone paved with benches provided en route at intervals. The path is surrounded by scenic views and captivating flora and fauna on both sides. Generally, the pilgrimage to Tunganath is undertaken as part of the Panch Kedar trekking covering all five temples over a 170 km (105.6 mi) route (road cum trek length) starting from Rishikesh in the order of: Kedarnath, Tungnath, Rudranath, Madhyamaheswar and Kalpeshwar. The few pilgrims who undertake this trekking pilgrimage to the shrine do so in summer months (end April or early May to October) as the temple remains snow bound and unapproachable. During this period even Chopta, the nearest road head remains deserted. But it is said that few adepts come to the area during the winter avoiding the pilgrims. The steep climb to Chandrashila is for 2 km (1.2 mi).

The nearest airport is Jolly Grant, Dehradun (258 km (160 mi)). The nearest railway station is at Rishikesh (241 km (150 mi)).

=== Ravana Shila / Speaking Mountain ===
Ravana shila is located above the Tungnath temple, there is a small temple which is known as Chandra Shila. Ravana Shila or Speaking mountain has its own historical importance related to the Ramayana. After killing Ravana, Rama was charged with the sin of Brahmahatya. He then started austerities for Shiva and requested Shiva to release him from the sin of killing a Brahmin (Ravana). During his penance, he built the Ramanathaswamy Temple in Rameshwaram, in Tamil Nadu. The temple in Rameshwaram is one of the 12 Jyotirlingas.

== See also ==
- Hindu temple
- Amarnath Temple
- Pashupatinath Temple
- Mandal
