= Mandal, Uttarakhand =

Mandal
- Village
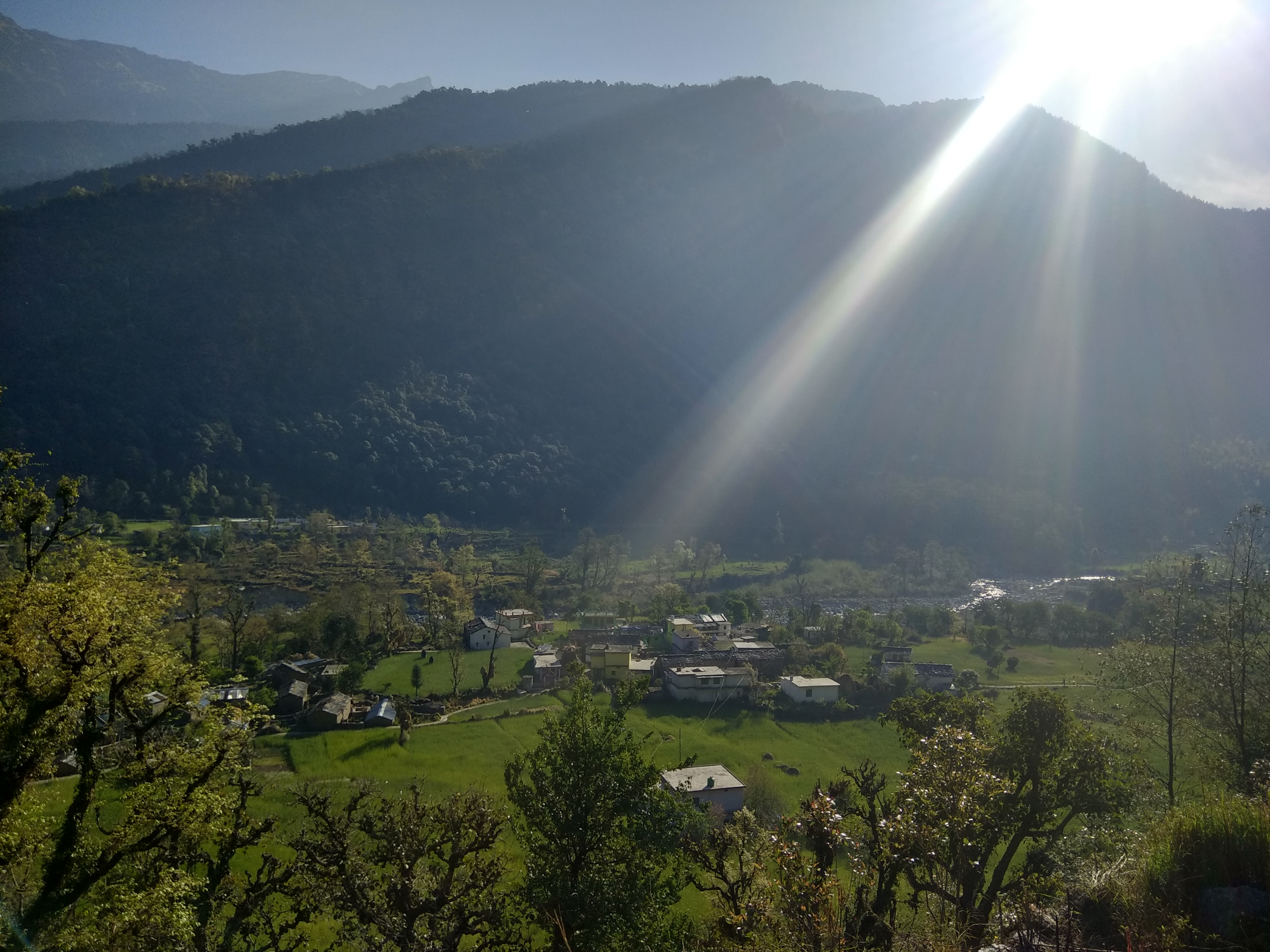
- Mandal Village

- Location in Uttarakhand, India
- Coordinates: 30.455°N 79.275°E
- Country: India
- State: Uttarakhand
- District: Chamoli

Government
  - Type: Gram Panchayat

Area
  - Total: 1.2 km^{2} (0.46 sq mi)
- Elevation: 1,500–1,700 m (4,900–5,600 ft)

Population (2011)
  - Total: 452

Languages
  - Official: Hindi
- Time zone: UTC+5:30 (IST)
- PIN: 246401
- Vehicle registration: UK-11
- Website: uk.gov.in

Mandal is a village in the Garhwal Himalayas in Chamoli tensil, Chamoli district, Uttarakhand, India.

It is situated 23 km away from sub-district headquarters Chamoli and 13 km away from district headquarters Gopeshwar.

== Demographics ==
The total geographical area of the village is 119.42 hectares. Mandal has a total population of 452. There are about 108 houses in the village. As of 2019, Mandal comes under the Badrinath assembly & Garhwal parliamentary constituency. Gopeshwar is the nearest town to Mandal, which is approximately 13 km away.

== See also ==
- Gopeshwar
- Chamoli
- Tunganath
