= Chaukhamba =

Mountain massif in the Gangotri Group of the Garhwal Himalaya, India

Chaukhamba 1
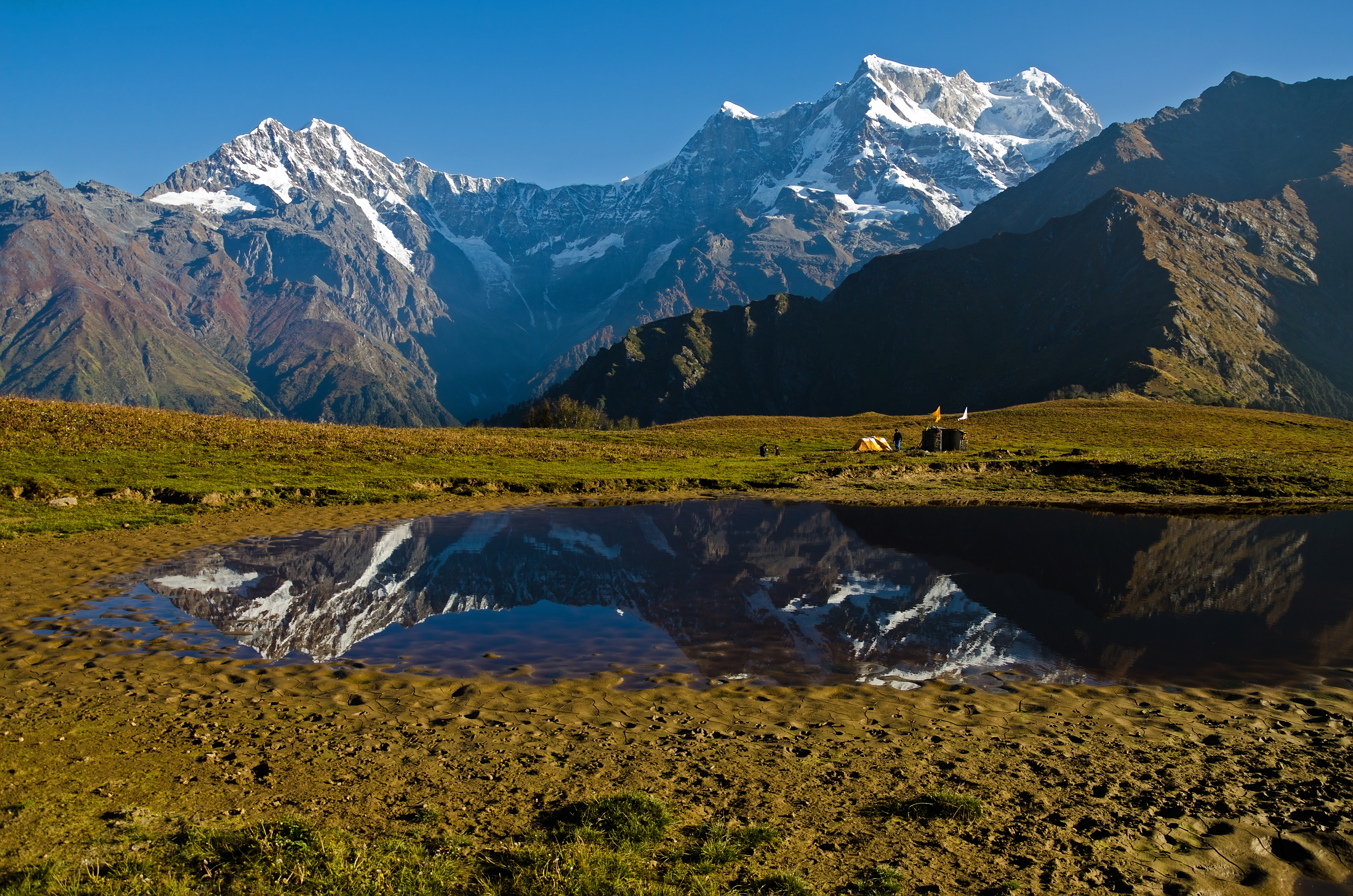
- Chaukhamba peak (right) seen from Budha Madhyamaheshwar

Highest point
- Elevation: 7,138 m (23,419 ft)
- Prominence: 1,594 m (5,230 ft)
- Listing: Ultra
- Coordinates: 30°44′59″N 79°17′28″E

Geography
- Location within India
- Location: Uttarakhand, India
- Parent range: Gangotri Group, Garhwal Himalaya

Climbing
- First ascent: 13 June 1952, by Lucien George and Victor Russenberger

Chaukhamba is a mountain massif in the Gangotri Group of the Garhwal Himalaya. Its main summit, Chaukhamba I, is the highest peak in the group. It lies at the head of the Gangotri Glacier and forms the eastern anchor of the group. It is located in the northern Indian state of Uttarakhand, west of the Hindu holy town of Badrinath.

== Summits ==
Chaukhamba has four summits, along a northeast–southwest trending ridge, and ranging in elevation from 7,138 metres (23,419 ft) to 6,854 m (22,487 ft) with an average elevation 7,014 m; the main summit is at the northeast end.

Chaukamba I	7,138 m (23,419 ft)
Chaukamba II	7,070 m (23,196 ft)
Chaukamba III	6,995 m (22,949 ft)
Chaukamba IV	6,854 m (22,487 ft)

== History ==
After unsuccessful attempts in 1938 and 1939, Chaukhamba I was first climbed on 13 June 1952, by Lucien George and Victor Russenberger (Swiss members of an otherwise French expedition). They ascended the northeast face, from the Bhagirathi-Kharak Glacier. Other members of the expedition were the French alpinist and traveler Marie-Louise Plovier Chapelle and the renowned French alpinist and climber Édouard Frendo.

Chaukhamba I is an ultra-prominent peak, with a prominence of more than 1,500m. Mana Pass is the key col for Chaukhamba I.

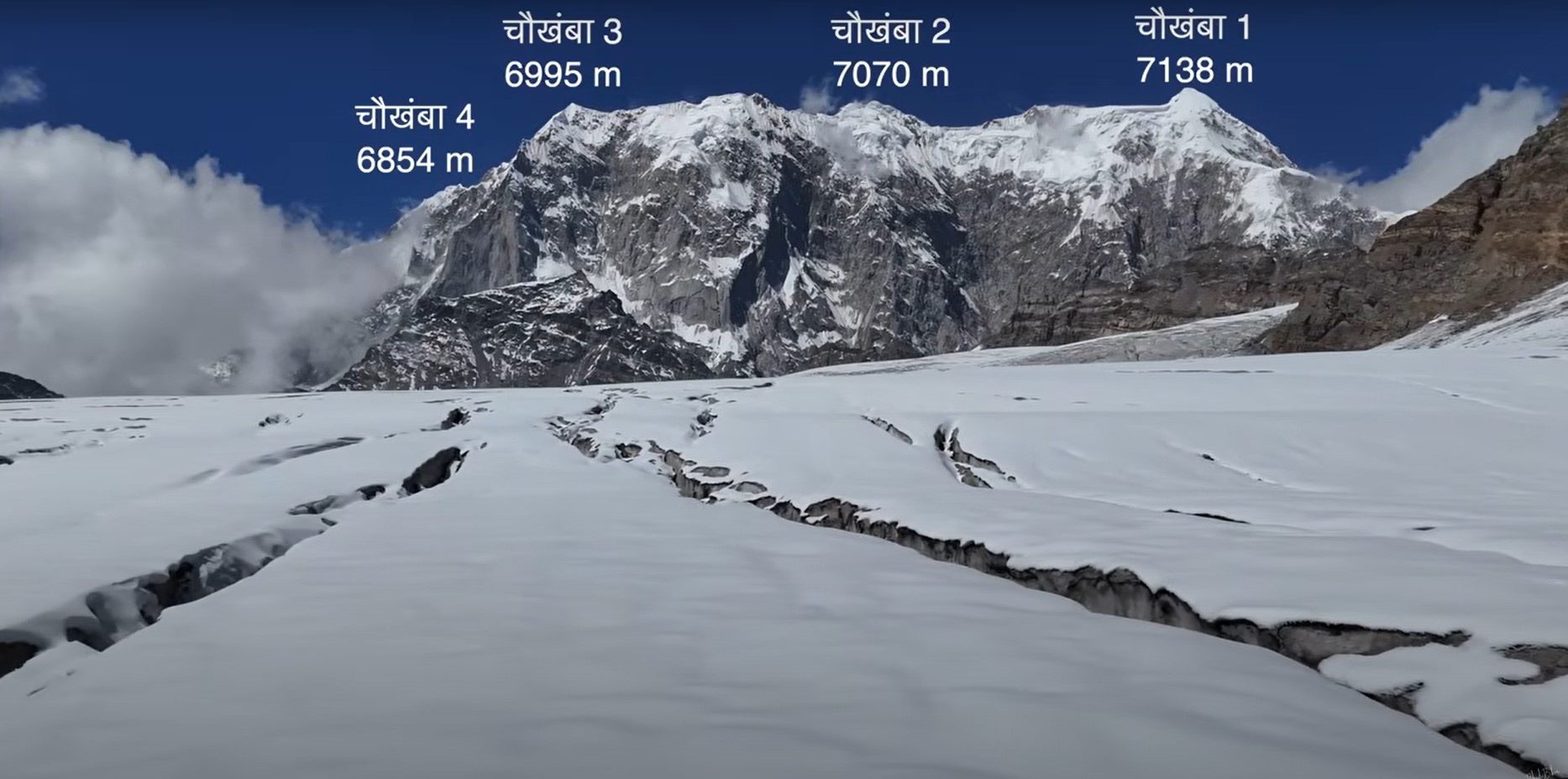
Chaukhamba is a mountain massif in the Gangotri Group of the Garhwal Himalaya, India

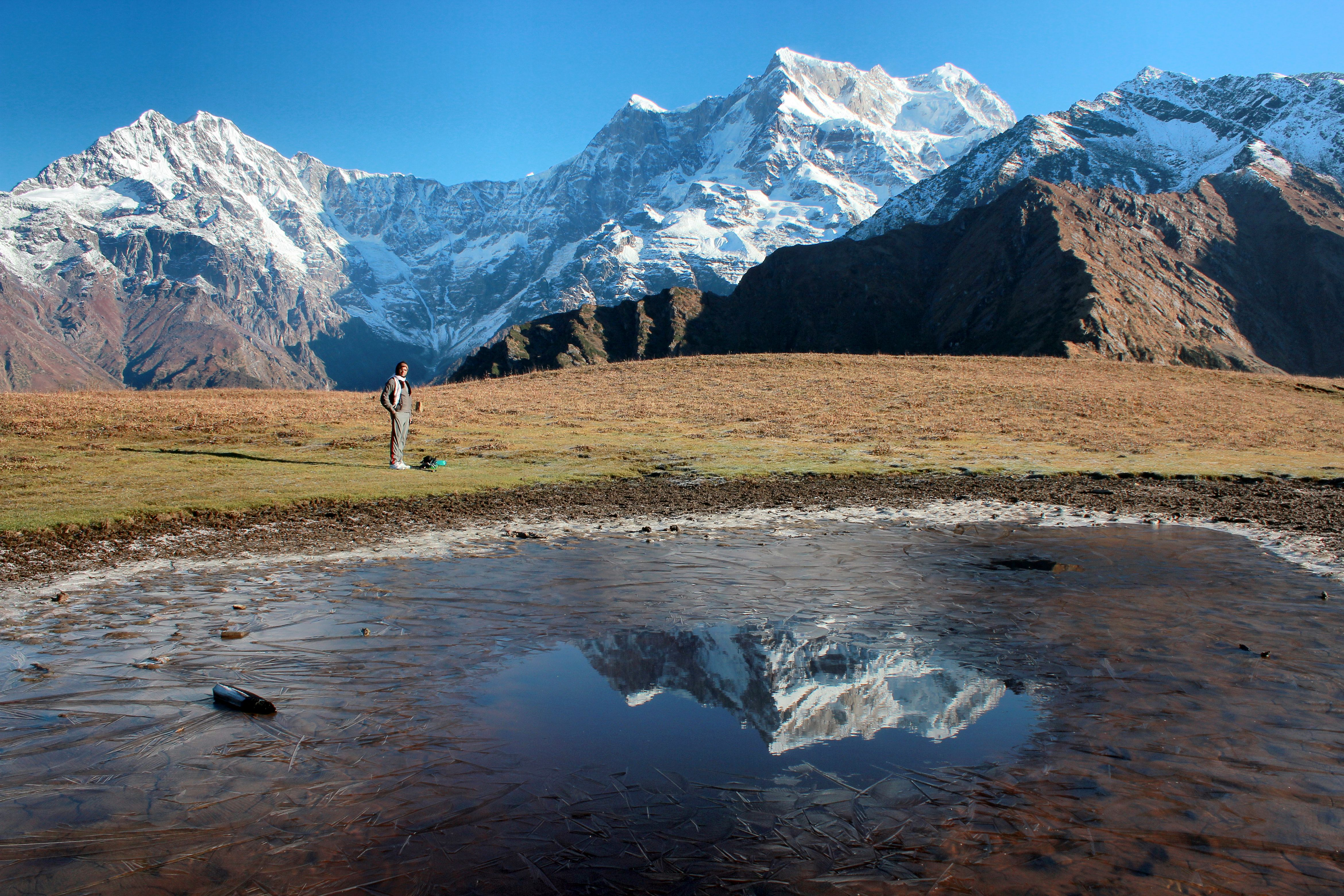
Mt Mandani and Chaukhamba with reflection on semi frozen lake at Boodha Madhyamaheshwar

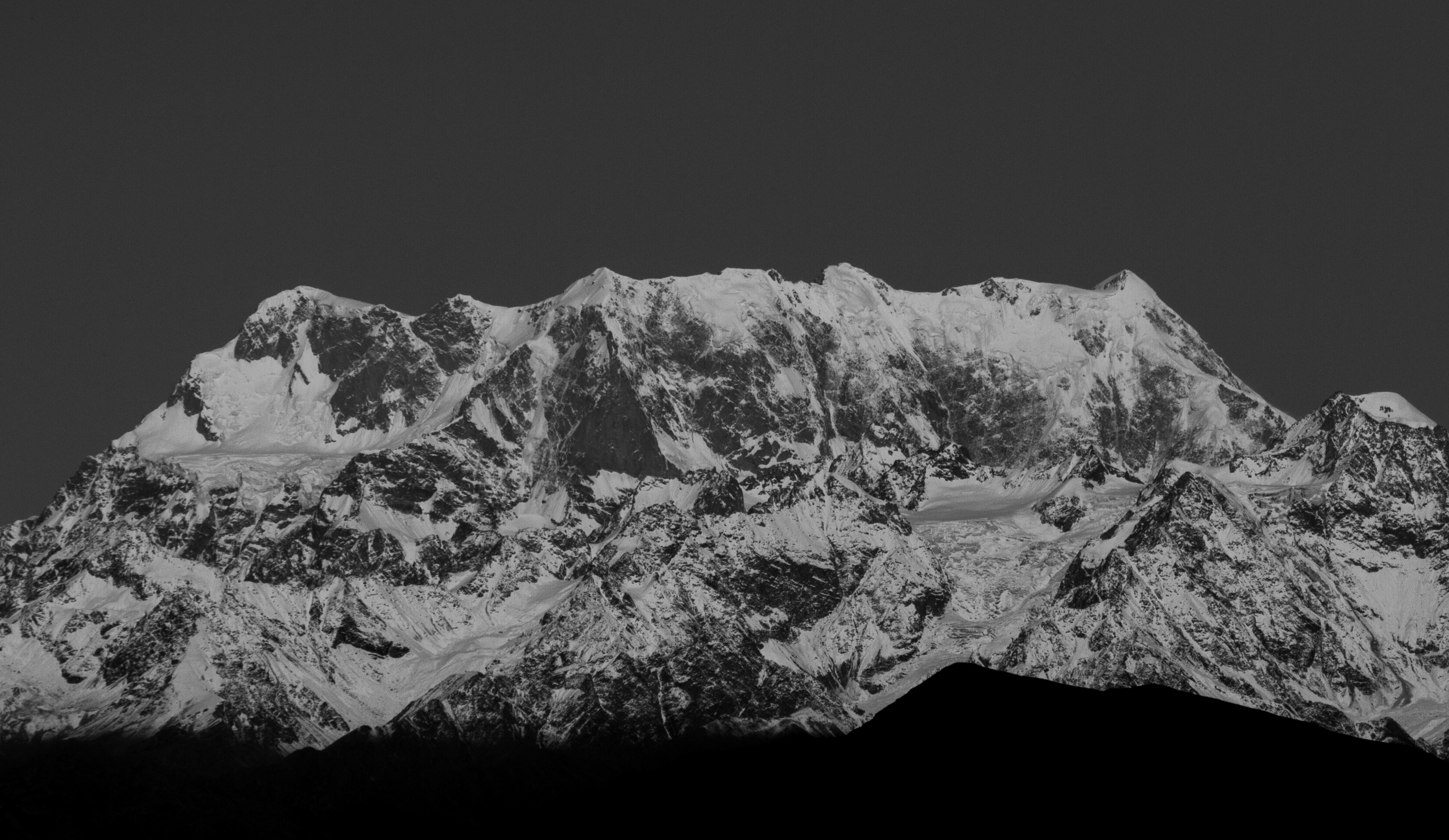
Chaukhamba Massif from Bedni Bugyal

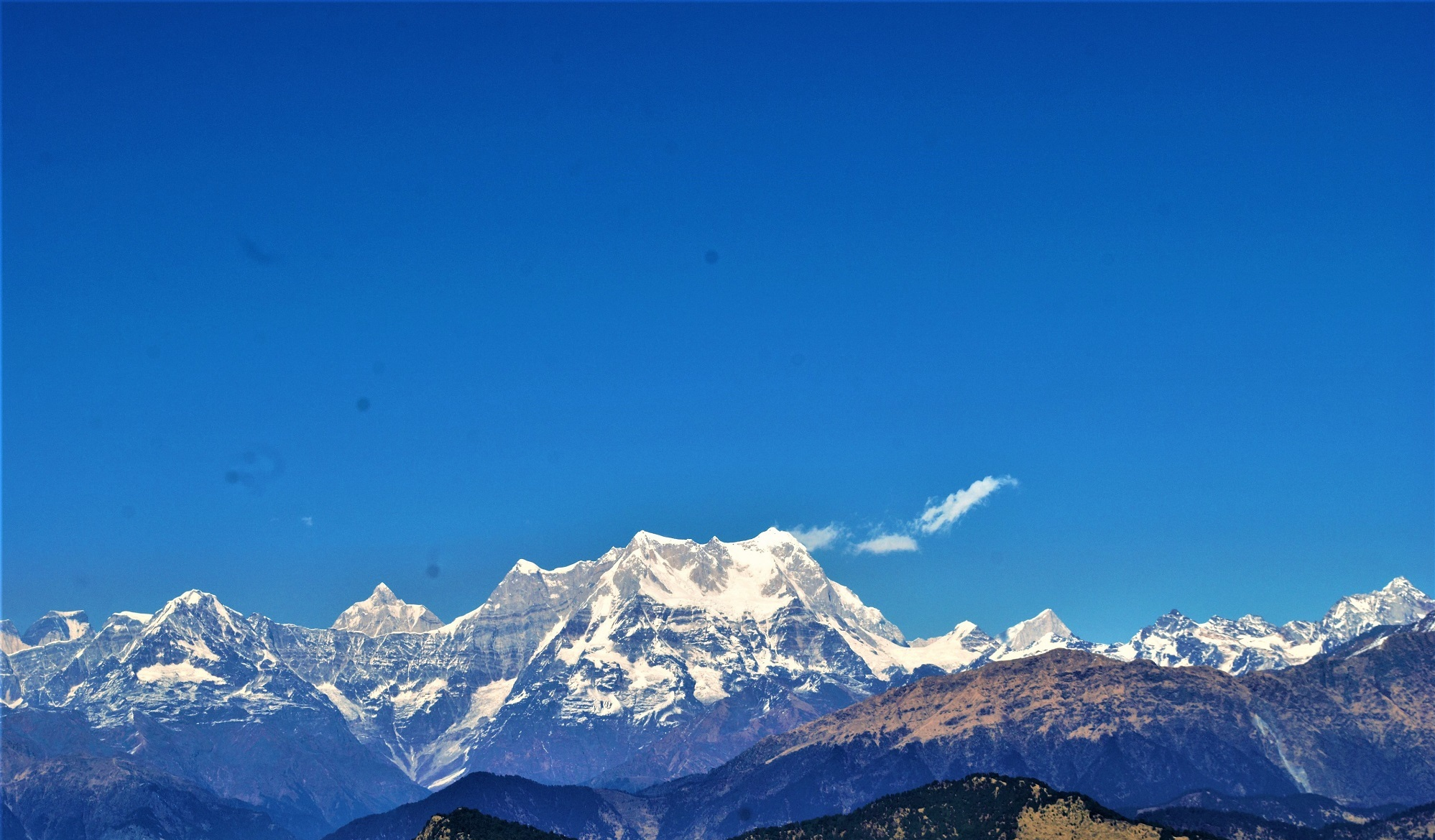
Chaukhamba View From Kartik Swami Temple Rudraprayag

== Photo gallery ==
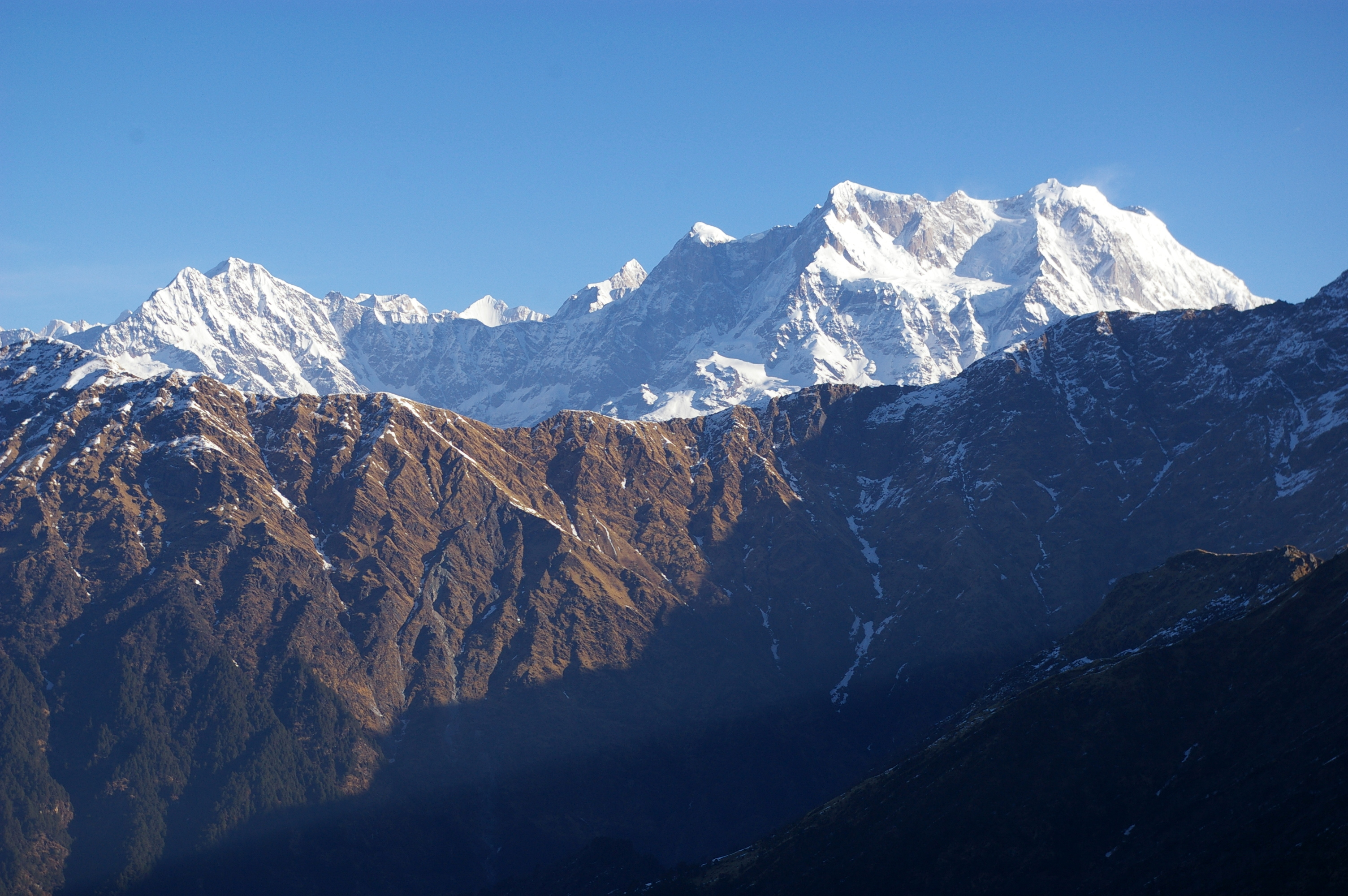
Chaukhamba from Tungnath

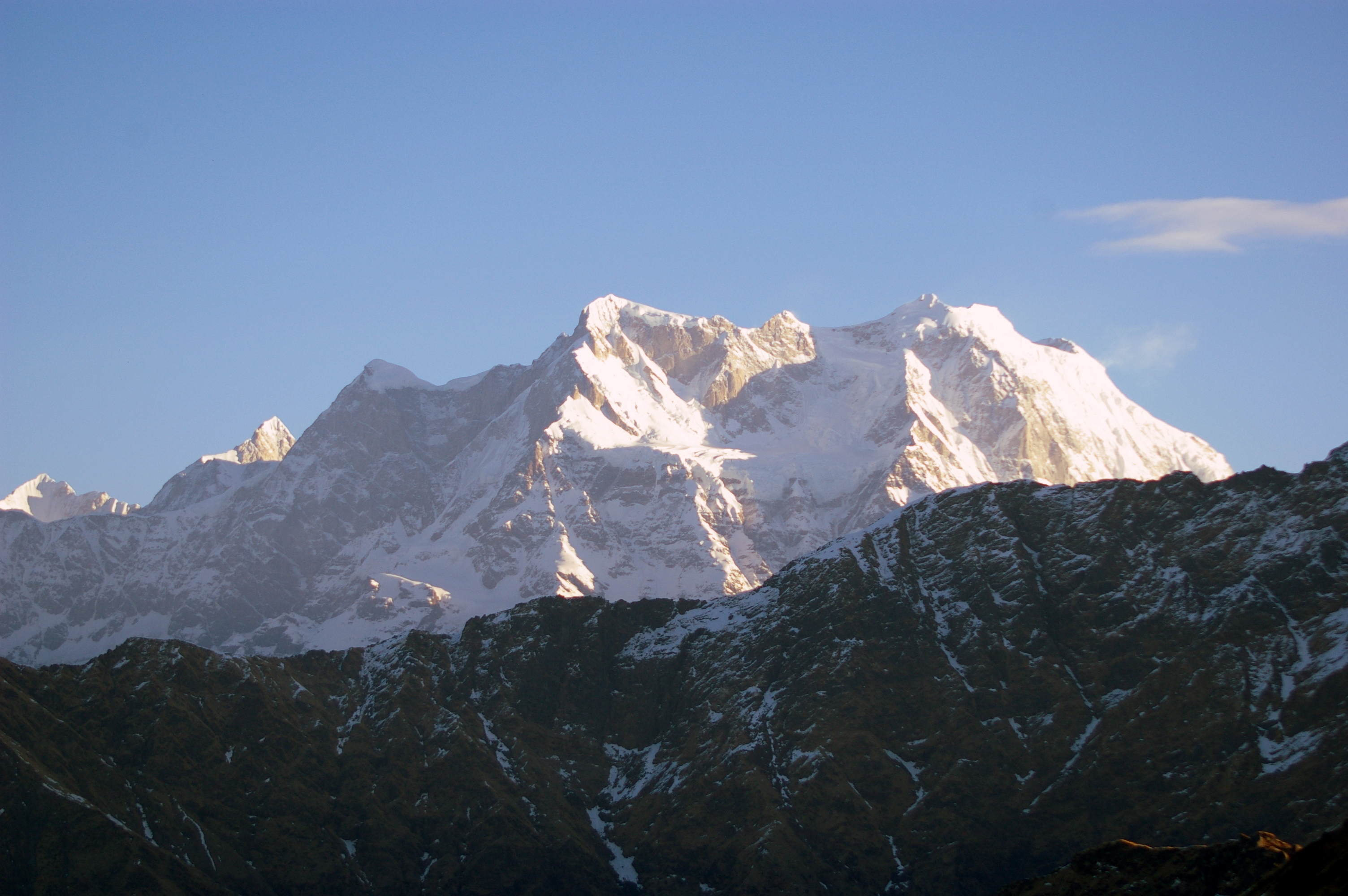
Chaukhamba from Tungnath shortly after sunrise

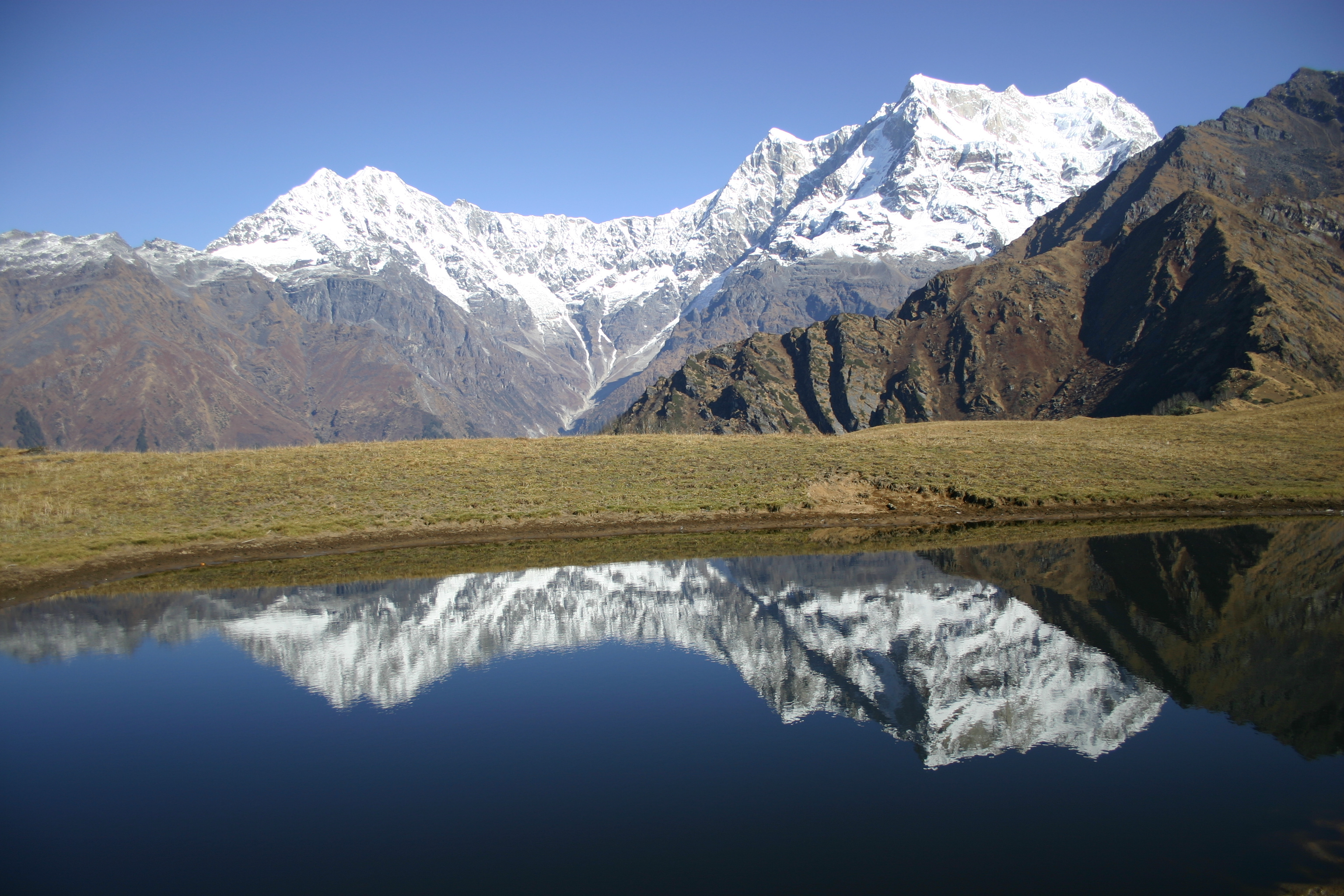

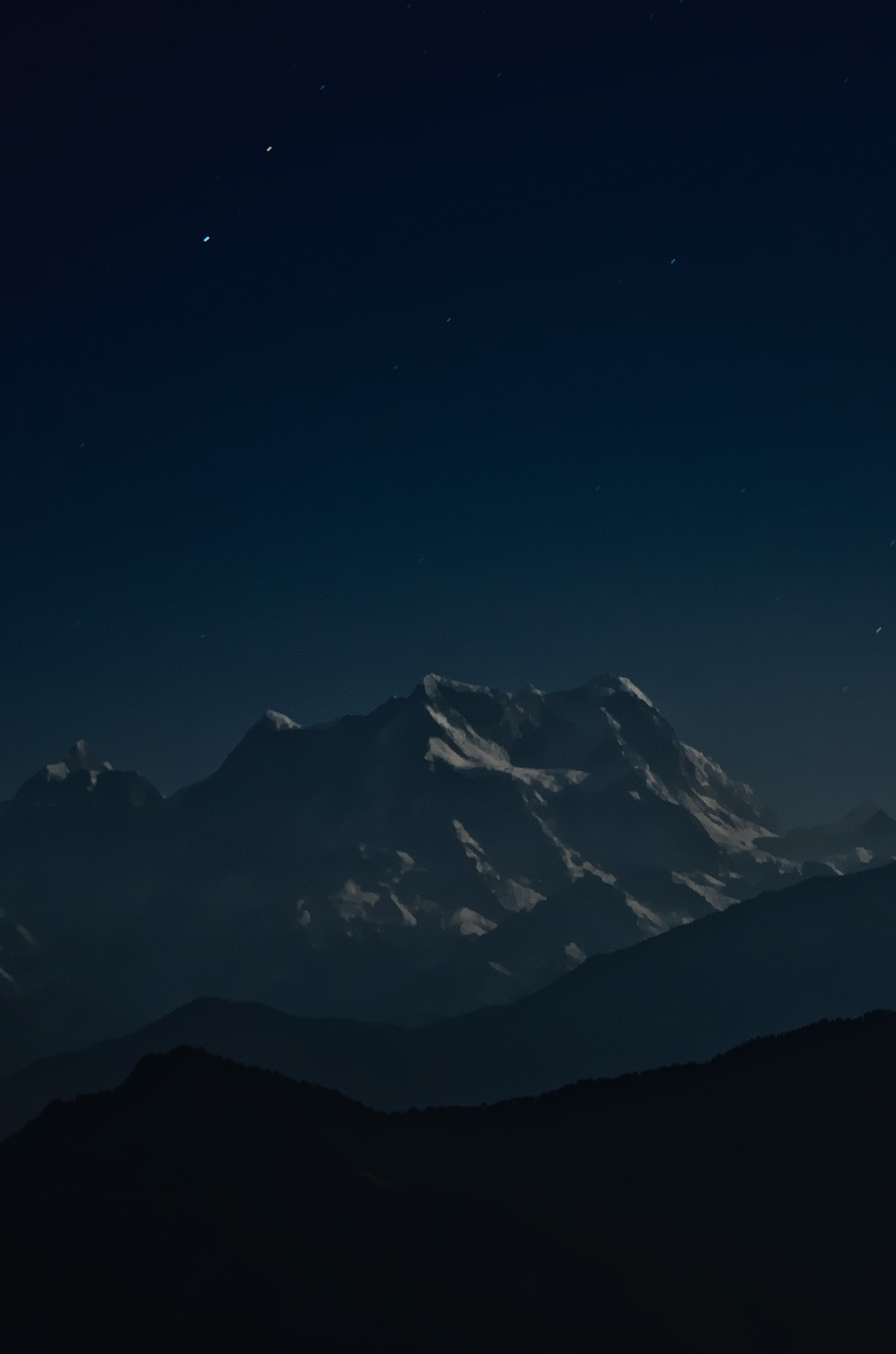
Moonlit Chaukhamba from the Kartikswamy temple

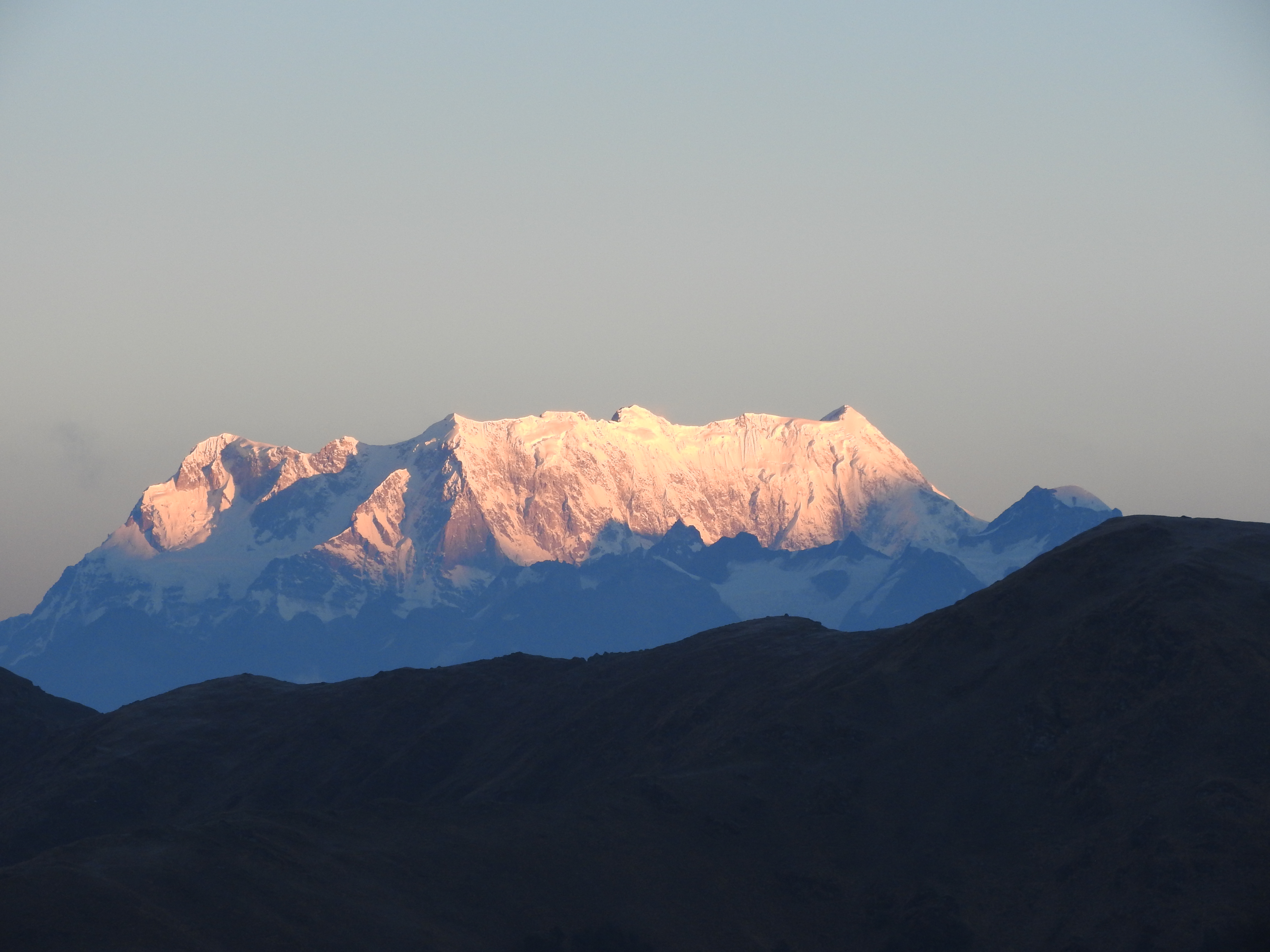

== See also ==
- List of mountain peaks of Uttarakhand
- List of ultras of the Himalayas
