= Ukhimath =

Town in Uttarakhand, India

Ukhimath (Okhimath)
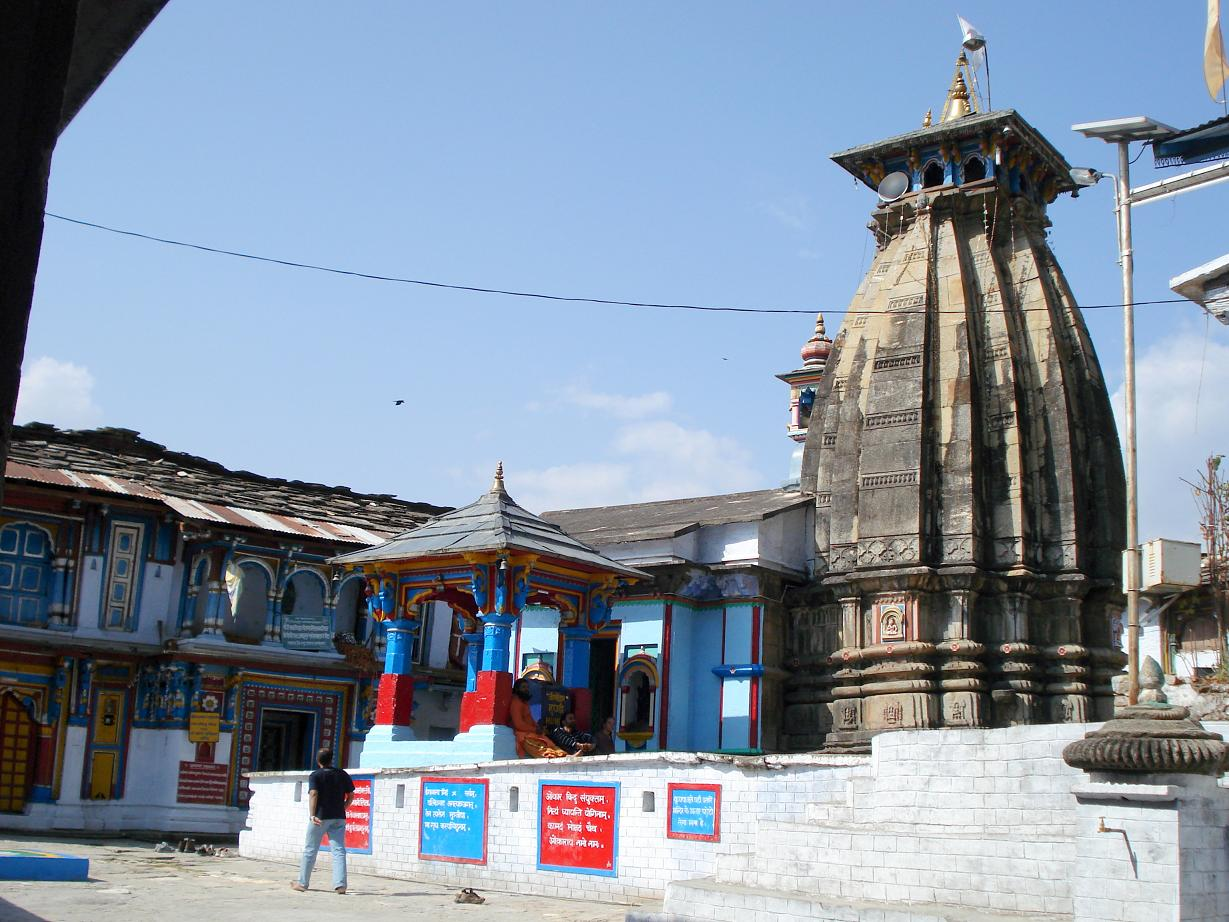
- Omkareshwar Temple in Ukhimath

- Location in Uttarakhand

Religion
- Affiliation: Hinduism
- District: Rudraprayag
- Deity: Winter Abode of Kedarnath and Madhyamaheshwar
- Festival: Madhyamaheshwar Mela (Madhyun Mela)

Location
- State: Uttarakhand
- Country: India
- Coordinates: 30°31′06″N 79°5′43″E

Architecture
- Type: North-Indian Himalayan architecture
- Creator: Pandavas (according to legend)
- Completed: Unknown
- Elevation: 1,311 m (4,301 ft)

Ukhimath (Hindi: ऊखीमठ) is a town and an important pilgrimage site in the Rudraprayag district of the Indian state of Uttarakhand. It is situated at an elevation of about 1311 metres above sea level and lies approximately 41 kilometres from Rudraprayag.

== Religious significance ==
During the winter months, the idols (dolis) from the Kedarnath Temple and Madhyamaheshwar Temple are brought to Ukhimath, where they are worshipped for six months.

According to Hindu mythology, this place is associated with the marriage of Usha (daughter of Banasura) and Aniruddha (grandson of Lord Krishna). It is believed that the name *Ukhimath* (earlier *Ushamath*) is derived from Usha’s name.

In winter, the Utsava Murti (festival idol) of Lord Kedarnath is worshipped here at the Omkareshwar Temple. Lord Omkareshwar is also worshipped here throughout the year.

== Administrative status ==
On 7 July 2012, the two revenue villages of Dangwari and Bhatwari in Rudraprayag district were merged to form the Nagar Panchayat (municipal board) of Ukhimath.

== Gallery ==
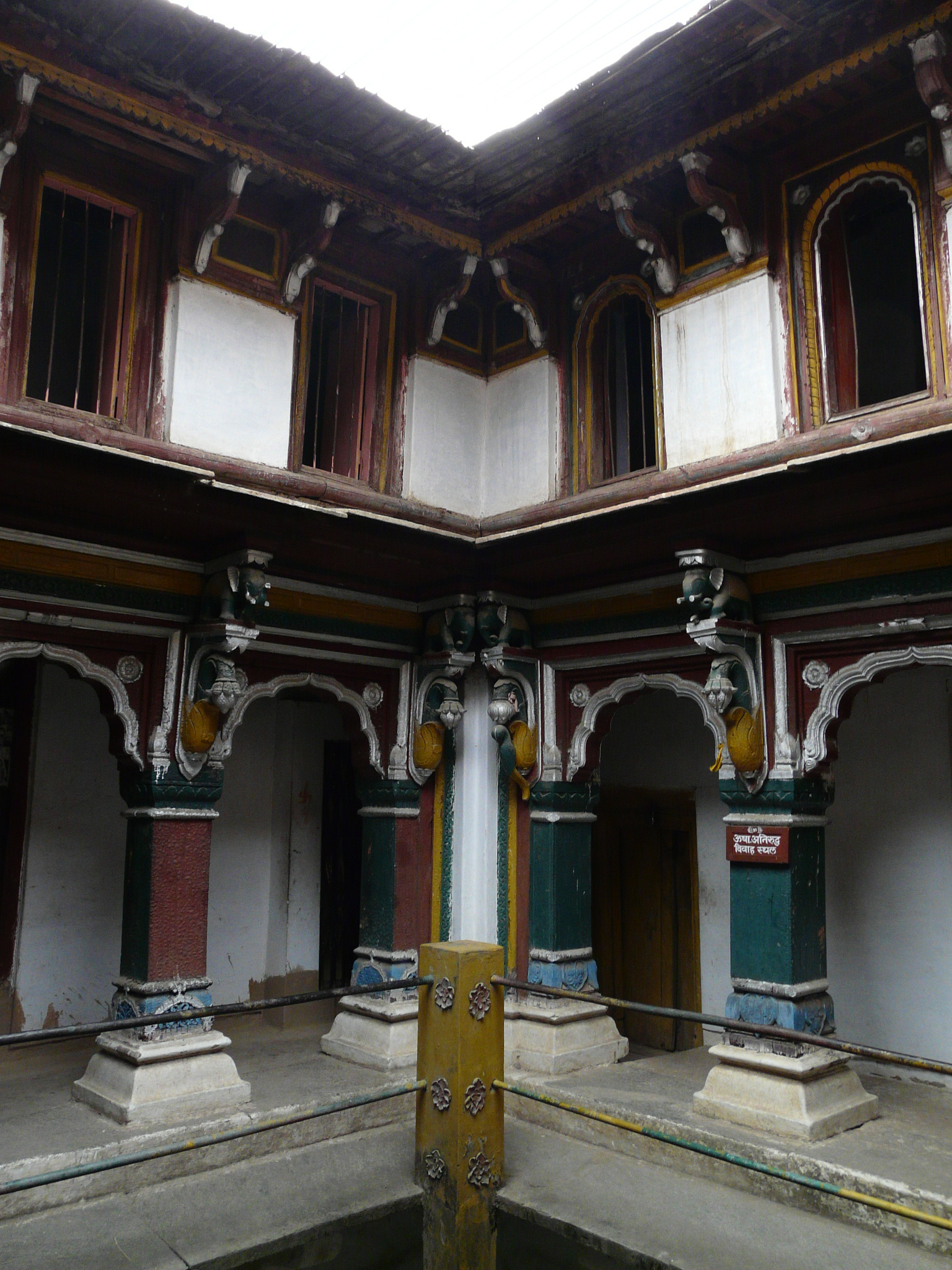
The courtyard around the Omkareshwar Temple in Ukhimath.

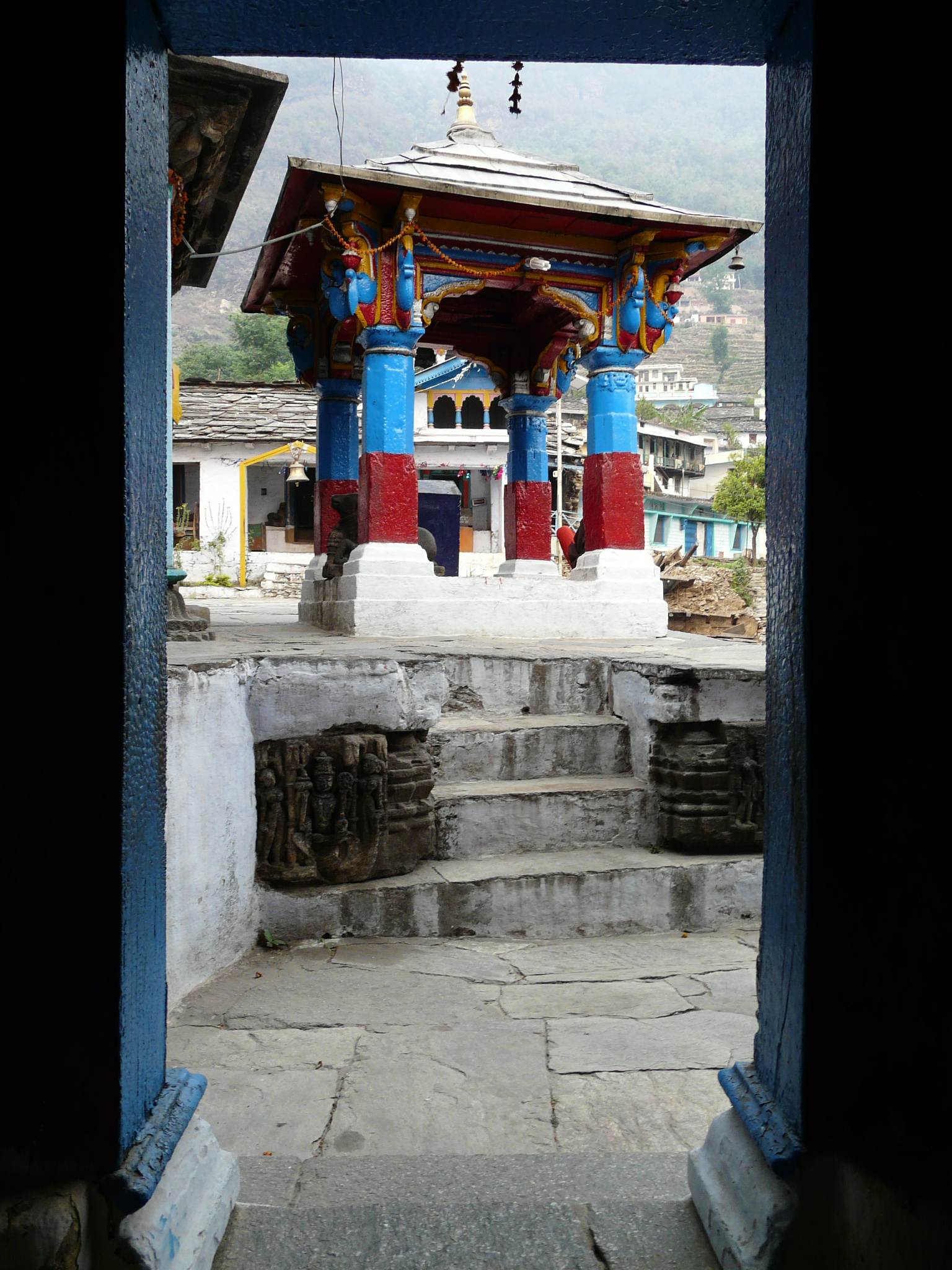
Close-up view of the mandapa (pillared hall) in the temple.

== See also ==
- Kedarnath
- Rudraprayag
