= Chamrao Parbat II =

Mountain in Uttarakhand, India

- P 6760
- Location within Uttarakhand

Highest point
- Elevation: 6,760 m (22,180 ft)
- Prominence: 210 m (690 ft)
- Coordinates: 30°57′57″N 79°32′53″E

Geography
- Location: Uttarakhand, India
- Parent range: Garhwal Himalaya

Climbing
- First ascent: W. G. LOWE and Hillary climbed on 5 August 1951

Chamrao Parbat II is a mountain of the Garhwal Himalaya in Uttarakhand, India. It is situated in the Zaskar Range. The elevation of Chamrao Parbat II is 6,760 metres (22,178 ft) and its prominence is 210 metres (689 ft). It is 41st highest located entirely within the Uttarakhand. Nanda Devi, is the highest mountain in this category. It lies 6.6 km NW of Kamet 7,756 metres (25,446 ft). Its nearest higher neighbor Mukut Parbat 7,242 metres (23,760 ft) lies 2.5 km SE and it is 9 km NW of Mana NW 7,092 metres (23,268 ft). It lies 3.3 km SE of Chamrao Parbat I.

== Climbing history ==
A four-member New Zealand expedition team comprising E. P. Hillary from Auckland, W. G. Lowe from Hastings, F. M. Cotter from Christchurch, and H. E. RIDDIFORD and four sherpas Pasang Dawa Lama, Nima, his brother Thundu, and Ylla Tenzing started their journey from Ranikhet on 2 June 1951 towards Badrinath. Their main objectives in this expedition is Nilkanth and Mukut Parbat. They had climbed many other peaks including P. 6760. W. G. LOWE and Hillary climbed P. 6760 on 5 August 1951.

== Neighboring and subsidiary peaks ==
Neighboring or subsidiary peaks of Chamrao Parbat II:

- Kamet: 7,756 m (25,446 ft)30°55′12″N 79°35′30″E
- Mana Peak: 7,272 m (23,858 ft)30°52′50″N 79°36′55″E
- Mana Northwest: 7,092 m (23,268 ft)30°53′37″N 79°35′57″E
- Bidhan Parbat: 6,520 m (21,391 ft)30°51′48″N 79°40′49″E
- Mandir Parbat: 6,559 m (21,519 ft)30°49′40″N 79°36′14″E
- Abi Gamin: 7,355 m (24,131 ft)30°55′57″N 79°36′09″E
- Mukut Parbat: 7,242 m (23,760 ft)30°56′57″N 79°34′12″E
- Saraswati Parbat I: 6,940 m (22,769 ft)31°01′54″N 79°30′06″E

== Glaciers and rivers ==
Near by glaciers and river Dakshini Chamrao glacier, Balbala glacier and Paschimi Kamet glacier all the glacier drain their water in the Saraswati River which then joins Alaknanda River near Mana village one of the main tributaries of Ganga river. The River Dhauli Ganga emerges from Purbi Kamet Glacier and met Alaknanda river at Vishnu Prayag an 82 km journey from its mouth. Alaknanda river is one of the main tributaries of Ganga.

== See also ==
- List of Himalayan peaks of Uttarakhand
