= Saraswati Parbat II =

Mountain in Uttarakhand, India

- Location within Uttarakhand

Highest point
- Elevation: 6,775 m (22,228 ft)
- Prominence: 551 m (1,808 ft)
- Coordinates: 31°00′51″N 79°30′30″E

Geography
- Location: Uttarakhand, India
- Parent range: Garhwal Himalaya

Saraswati Parbat II is a mountain of the Garhwal Himalaya in Uttarakhand India.The elevation of Saraswati Parbat II is 6,775 metres (22,228 ft) and its prominence is 551 metres (1,808 ft). It is 37th highest located entirely within the Uttrakhand. Nanda Devi, is the highest mountain in this category. It falls under Kamet Zaskar Range. It lies between Saraswati Parbat I and Chamrao Parbat I It lies 3.1 km NNW of Chamrao Parbat I 6,910 metres (22,671 ft). Its nearest higher neighbor Saraswati Parbat I 6,940 metres (22,769 ft). It is located 9.1 km NNW of Mukut Parbat 7,242 metres (23,760 ft) and 7.1 km west lies Balbala 6,416 metres (21,050 ft).

== Neighboring and subsidiary peaks ==
neighboring or subsidiary peaks of Saraswati Parbat II:

- Kamet: 7,756 m (25,446 ft), 30°55′12″N 79°35′30″E
- Abi Gamin: 7,355 m (24,131 ft), 30°56′59″N 79°14′30″E
- Mukut Parbat: 7,242 m (23,760 ft), 30°56′57″N 79°34′12″E
- Chamrao Parbat I: 6,910 m (22,671 ft), 30°59′24″N 79°31′45″E
- Saraswati Parbat I: 6,940 m (22,769 ft), 30°59′24″N 79°31′45″E
- Balbala (mountain): 6,416 m (21,050 ft), 31°01′25″N 79°26′02″E

== Glaciers and rivers ==
On the south western side lies Uttari Chamrao Glacier, Dakshini Chamrao Glacier, Balbala Glacier, Khagyan Glacier and Paschimi Kamet glacier all these glaciers drain their water in the Saraswati River which then joins Alaknanda River at Keshav Prayag near Mana village one of the main tributaries of river Ganga. River Alaknanda merges with river Bhagirathi the other main tributaries of river Ganga at Dev Prayag and called Ganga there after.

== See also ==
- List of Himalayan peaks of Uttarakhand
