= Nilgiri Parbat =

Mountain in Uttarakhand, India

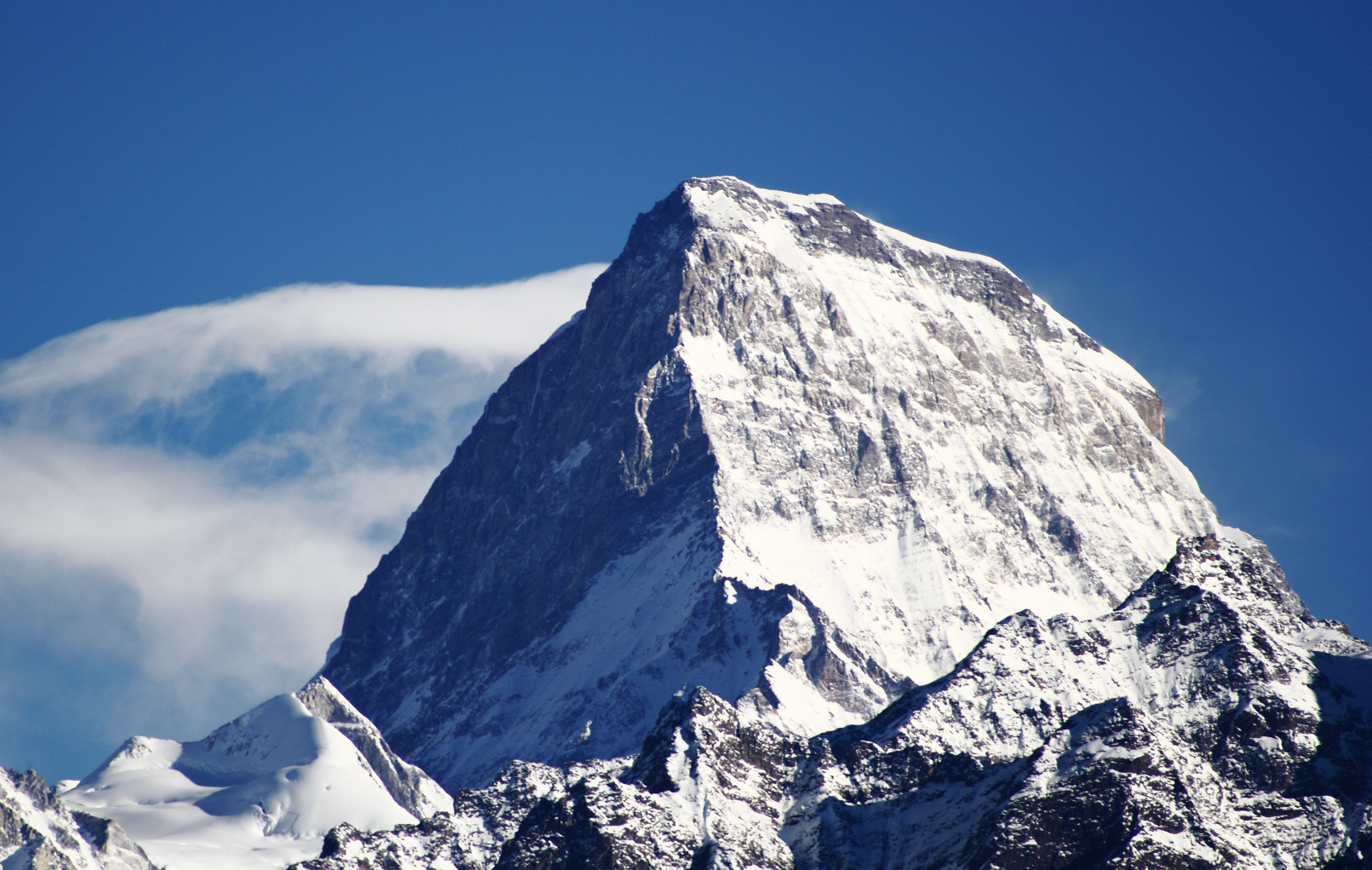
- Nilgiri Parbat From Auli

Highest point
- Elevation: 6,474 m (21,240 ft)
- Prominence: 893 m (2,930 ft)
- Listing: Mountain peaks of Uttarakhand
- Coordinates: 30°46′59″N 79°38′43″E

Geography
- Location within Uttarakhand
- Location: Uttarakhand, India
- Parent range: Garhwal Himalaya

Climbing
- First ascent: 1937 by Frank Smythe

Nilgiri Parbat is a mountain of the Garhwal Himalaya in Uttarakhand India and rises to an elevation of 6,474 metres (21,240 ft) with a prominence is 893 metres (2,930 ft). It is 91st highest located entirely within Uttarakhand. Nanda Devi, is the highest mountain in this category. It lies 6.7 km NW of Ratabon and 9.4 km south of Deoban (6,855 metres (22,490 ft)). It lies 6.3 km SSW of Mandir Parbat its nearest higher neighbor. It is located 12.7 km NNW of Hathi Parbat 6,727 metres (22,070 ft) and 11.2 km north lies Mana Peak 7,272 metres (23,858 ft).

== Climbing history ==
In 1937 Frank Smythe climbed Nilgiri Parbat, completing the first ascent. In 1962 An Indian expedition, led by Captain Jagjit Singh, attempted Mana Peak and Nilgiri Parbat in Garhwal. Failed in their two successive attempt to climb Nilgiri Parbat in the post-monsoon period. but the party suffered severe frostbite.

An Indian team led by V. Shankar, Vinay Hegde, Vivek Hegde and Dinesh Shertate attempted but failed due to bad weather. They set up Base Camp 3 km below the snout of the Khulia Garvia Glacier. They set up Camp III near the northwest ridge at 5640 meters. After two days of heavy snowfall, and bad weather they called off their attempt. On June 7, 1994, An Indian Army expedition led by Brigadier Pushkar Chand successfully climbed Nilgiri Parbat when Lance Naik A. Arunagiri, Havildar S. Kumar, Sepoy Dev Lal and Havildar Major Satish reached the summit.

== Neighboring and subsidiary peaks ==
neighboring peaks of Nilgiri Parbat:

- Abi Gamin7,355 m (24,131 ft)30°55′57″N 79°36′09″E
- Kamet 7,756 m (25,446 ft)30°55′12″N 79°35′30″E
- Chamrao Parbat I 6,910 m (22,671 ft)30°59′24″N 79°31′45″E
- Deoban 6,855 m (22,490 ft)30°52′04″N 79°39′00″E
- Hathi Parbat 6,727 m (22,070 ft)30°41′06″N 79°42′21″E
- Mana Peak 7,272 m (23,858 ft)30°52′50″N 79°36′55″E
- Mana Northwest 7,092 m (23,268 ft)30°53′37″N 79°35′57″E
- Bidhan 6,520 m (21,391 ft)30°51′48″N 79°40′49″E

== Glaciers and rivers ==
Khulia Garvia Glacier lies on the western side of Nilgiri Parbat and Bank kund Glacier lies on the northern side. On the eastern side lies Ratabon Glacier and on the southern side lies Tipra Bamak. Amrit Ganga comes from Bank kund glacier after a short run it joins Dhauli Ganga at Gamshali which later joins Alaknanda River at Vishnu Prayag one of the main tributaries of river Ganga. Alaknanda later joins Bhagirathi River the other main tributaries of river Ganga at Dev Prayag and became Ganga there after. Khulia Garvia Glacier drains down to Saraswati River and Saraswati River joins Alaknanda near Mana village. Ratabon drains down to Amrit Ganga . In the south Pushpawati River joins Bhyundar Ganga near Ghagharia and became known as Lakshman Ganga that later joins Alaknanda at Govindghat.
