= Geldhung =

Mountain in Uttarakhand, India

- Location within Uttarakhand

Highest point
- Elevation: 6,163 m (20,220 ft)
- Prominence: 554 m (1,818 ft)
- Coordinates: 30°54′00″N 79°47′50″E

Geography
- Location: Uttarakhand, India
- Parent range: Garhwal Himalaya

Climbing
- First ascent: On September 7, 1975 by "The Durgapur Mountaineering Association".

Geldhung is a mountain of the Garhwal Himalaya in Uttarakhand India. It is situated in the Kamet range. The elevation of Geldhung is 6,163 metres (20,220 ft) and its prominence is 554 metres (1,818 ft). It is 146th highest located entirely within the Uttrakhand. Nanda Devi, is the highest mountain in this category. It lies 11 km SSE of Ganesh Parbat 6,532 metres (21,430 ft) . Bidhan Parbat 6,520 metres (21,391 ft) lies 12 km WSW and It lies 19.8 km ESE of Kamet 7,756 metres (25,446 ft). It lies 19.5 km East of Mana NW 7,092 metres (23,268 ft).

== Climbing history ==
Geldhung was first climbed by a team from Durgapur, "The Durgapur Mountaineering Association". The trek started from Malari and established their Base Camp at Patalpani. On September 7, 1975, they climbed this virgin peak. The summiters were Sibapada Chakraborty, Amit Sinha, Dipak Pal and two Sherpas.

== Neighboring and subsidiary peaks ==
Neighboring or subsidiary peaks of Geldhung:

- Kamet: 7,756 m (25,446 ft)30°55′12″N 79°35′30″E
- Mana Peak: 7,272 m (23,858 ft)30°52′50″N 79°36′55″E
- Mana Northwest: 7,092 m (23,268 ft)30°53′37″N 79°35′57″E
- Bidhan: 6,520 m (21,391 ft)30°51′48″N 79°40′49″E
- Mandir Parbat: 6,559 m (21,519 ft)30°49′40″N 79°36′14″E
- Gauri Parbat 6,708 metres (22,008 ft)30°42′40″N 79°42′03″E
- Rataban 6,166 metres (20,230 ft)30°45′02″N 79°42′19″E
- Nilgiri Parbat 6,474 metres (21,240 ft)30°46′59″N 79°38′43″E
- Hathi Parbat 6,727 metres (22,070 ft)30°41′06″N 79°42′21″E

== Glaciers and rivers ==
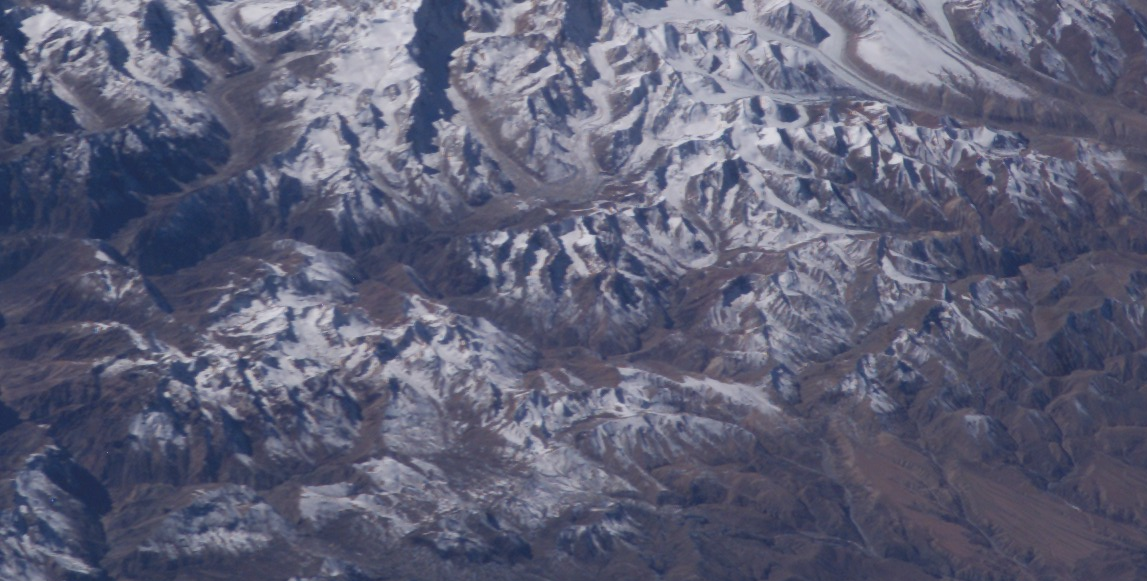
Geldhung with glacier valleys (middle of photo), upper Dhauliganga Valley

The near by Glaciers are Raikana Glacier, Uttari Raikana Glacier, Ganesh Glacier and Purbi Kamet Glacier from there emerges the river Dhauli Ganga which met Alaknanda river at Vishnu Prayag an 82 km journey from its mouth. Alaknanda river is one of the main tributaries of river Ganga which later joins the other main tributaries Bhagirathi river at Dev Prayag and became Ganga there after.

== See also ==
- List of Himalayan peaks of Uttarakhand
