= Balbala (mountain) =

Mountain in Uttarakhand, India

- Location within Uttarakhand

Highest point
- Elevation: 6,416 m (21,050 ft)
- Prominence: 305 m (1,001 ft)
- Coordinates: 31°01′25″N 79°26′02″E

Geography
- Location: Uttarakhand, India
- Parent range: Garhwal Himalaya

Climbing
- First ascent: It was first climbed On 25, August 1947 by the Swiss Expedition

Balbala is a mountain of the Garhwal Himalaya in Uttarakhand India. It is situated in the Zanskar Range on the border between India and China. The elevation of Balbala is 6,416 metres (21,050 ft) and its prominence is 305 metres (1,001 ft). It is 100th highest located entirely within the Uttarakhand. Nanda Devi, is the highest mountain in this category. It lies 2 km east of Balbala West 6,282 metres (20,610 ft) . Saraswati Parbat I 6,940 metres (22,769 ft) lies 6.5 km ENE and it is 9.6 km WNW of Chamrao Parbat I 6,910 metres (22,671 ft). It lies 6.7 km ESE of Tara Parbat 6,069 metres (19,911 ft).

== Climbing history ==
It was first climbed in 1947 by the Swiss Garhwal Expedition which started from the Gangotri range. The team consisted of Annelies Lohner, André Roch, Alfred Sutter, Alexandre Graven, René Dittert and four Sherpas. On 25 August at 10.30 a.m. they reached the summit of Balbala. The summiters were Dittert, Sutter, Ang Norbu, Graven, Tenzing, and Lohner.

== Neighboring and subsidiary peaks ==
Neighboring or subsidiary peaks of Balbala:

- Kamet: 7,756 m (25,446 ft)30°55′12″N 79°35′30″E
- Abi Gamin: 7,355 m (24,131 ft)30°55′57″N 79°36′09″E
- Mukut Parbat: 7,242 m (23,760 ft)30°56′57″N 79°34′12″E
- Saraswati Parbat I: 6,940 m (22,769 ft)31°01′54″N 79°30′06″E
- Balbala west: 6,282 m (20,610 ft)31°01′16″N 79°24′49″E
- Chamrao Parbat I: 6,910 m (22,671 ft)30°59′24″N 79°31′45″E

A team from the first battalion of the Indo-Tibetan Border Police (ITBP) also successfully climbed the peak. On September 4, 2021, the ITBP Sector Level Mountaineering Expedition (SHQ Dehradun) code name 'Parakram' summited the peak. Team was consisting Six summiteers Assistant Commandant Bhim Singh, Sub Inspector Praveen, Sub Inspector Ashish Ranjan, Sub Inspector Nikhil Gahlot, Constable Sunil Kumar and Constable Pradeep Panwar including guide Raju Martolia. The expedition was launched on 7 August from Joshimath, Uttarakhand. It was the first summit by any Indian expedition after a Swiss expedition which made it to the top.

== Glaciers and rivers ==
Dakshini Chamrao glacier, Balbala glacier and Paschimi Kamet glacier all the glacier drain their water in the Saraswati River which then joins Alaknanda River at Keshav Prayag near Mana village. Alaknanda River is one of the main tributaries of river Ganga that later joins Bhagirathi River the other main tributaries of river Ganga at Devprayag and became Ganga there after.

== See also ==
- List of Himalayan peaks of Uttarakhand
