= Ganesh Parbat =

Mountain in Uttarakhand, India

- Location within Uttarakhand

Highest point
- Elevation: 6,532 m (21,430 ft)
- Prominence: 500 m (1,600 ft)
- Coordinates: 30°58′21″N 79°43′03″E

Geography
- Location: Uttarakhand, India
- Parent range: Garhwal Himalaya

Climbing
- First ascent: on June 16 by an Indian Police expedition led by Shivraj Singh.

Ganesh Parbat is a mountain of the Garhwal Himalaya in Uttarakhand India.The elevation of Ganesh Parbat is 6,532 metres (21,430 ft) and its prominence is 500 metres (1,640 ft). It is 80th joint highest located entirely within the Uttarakhand. Nanda Devi, is the highest mountain in this category. It is situated in the Zaskar Range. It lies 13.3 km ENE of Kamet 7,756 metres (25,446 ft). Its nearest higher neighbor an unnamed peak 6,664 metres (21,864 ft) lies 8 km ENE and it is 11 km NWN of Geldhung 6,163 metres (20,220 ft). It lies 14.2 km NE of Mana Peak 7,272 metres (23,858 ft).

== Climbing history ==
On June 16 an Indian Police expedition team led by Shivraj Singh had the first ascent of Ganesh Parbat. The 10 men team reached the summit at 11:30 a.m. starting at 2 a.m. The leader reached the summit with Ramesh Shahi, P. Singh, Balwant Singh Pal, Ang Chatter, Sherpas Sang Boo Aila and Hisse, and Garhwalis HAP Puran and Kalyan Singh.

== Neighboring and subsidiary peaks ==
neighboring or subsidiary peaks of Ganesh Parbat:

- Kamet: 7,756 m (25,446 ft)30°55′12″N 79°35′30″E
- Mana Peak: 7,272 m (23,858 ft)30°52′50″N 79°36′55″E
- Mana Northwest: 7,092 m (23,268 ft)30°53′37″N 79°35′57″E
- Bidhan: 6,520 m (21,391 ft)30°51′48″N 79°40′49″E
- Mandir Parbat: 6,559 m (21,519 ft)30°49′40″N 79°36′14″E

== Glaciers and rivers ==
Raikana Glacier, Uttari Raikana Glacier, Ganesh Glacier all three glacier joins Purbi Kamet Glacier from there emerges the river Dhauli Ganga which met Alaknanda river at Vishnu Prayag an 82 km journey from its mouth. Alaknanda river is one of the main tributaries of river Ganga which later joins the other tributaries Bhagirathi river at Dev Prayag.

== See also ==
- List of Himalayan peaks of Uttarakhand
