= Bidhan Parbat =

Mountain in Uttarakhand, India

- Bidhan
- Location within Uttarakhand

Highest point
- Elevation: 6,520 m (21,390 ft)
- Prominence: 234 m (768 ft)
- Coordinates: 30°51′48″N 79°40′49″E

Geography
- Location: Uttarakhand, India
- Parent range: Garhwal Himalaya

Climbing
- First ascent: Frank Smythe, through Bankund glacier in 1937.

Bidhan Parbat is a mountain of the northern Garhwal Himalaya in Uttarakhand India.The elevation of Bidhan Parbat is 6,520 metres (21,391 ft) and its prominence is 234 metres (768 ft). It is 84th highest located entirely within the Uttrakhand. Nanda Devi, is the highest mountain in this category. It is situated in the Zaskar Range. It lies 3 km west of Deoban 6,855 metres (22,490 ft) its nearest higher neighbor. Mandir Parbat 6,559 metres (21,519 ft) lies 8.3 km SW and it is 10.4 km SE of Kamet 7,756 metres (25,446 ft). It lies 6.6 km SE of Mana Peak 7,272 metres (23,858 ft).

== Climbing history ==
A 10 member team from Calcutta, Delhi and Uttar Pradesh led by Sunil Chaudhuri of "The Mountaineers Club" climbed Bidhan Parbat On June 14 1968. They started their trek from Malari on June 4 and established their Base Camp at Sem Kharak on June 7. They established Camp I at 17,000 feet on the lateral moraine of the Sem Kharak Glacier on June 9, Camp II at 18,500 feet and Camp III at 20,000 feet. On June 12 they climbed an unnamed peak of 20,336 feet. The summiters are Pranesh Chakraborty, Amiya Kumar Mukherjee and Sherpas Pasang Tsering, Thondup and Kami Moti. They named it as Gouranga Parbat after Gouranga Sundar Chowdhury, who died in the Gangotri region. On June 14, Biswadeb Biswas, Gurdip Singh Malia and Sherpa's Pasang Tsering, Sonam Gyatso and Kami Moti climbed the unnamed peak of 21,390 feet and named it Bidhan Parbat. It was named Bidhan Parbat after the late Dr.Bidhan Chandra Roy former Chief Minister of West Bengal. The other members were Sunil Chaudhuri (Leader), Biswadeb Biswas (Tech. Adviser), Baidyanath Rakshit (Dy. Leader), Samar Banerjee (Manager), Santi Ghosh, Pranesh Chakraborty, Amiya Mukherjee, Dr. Bimal Bhusan Ghosh Dasti- dar (Medical Officer), Gurdeep Singh Malia of Delhi and Hukum Singh Bist of Uttar Pradesh. Later at joshimath they were told by An army expedition members Gurdial Singh and Major Bahuguna that they also climbed Bidhan Parbat instead of Deoban on June 17 and 20 with all their team members. They found their flag and other belongings intact which their summiters had placed on the summit on June 15. The same peak was climbed from two different direction in a gap of two days

A 10-member expedition team from Kolkata, led by Amitava Roy, came to climb Devban (6,855m). They finally climbed Bidhan Parvat. The team established their base camp on June 26 at Thaur Udiar in the Amritganga Valley and established three camps up the Devban Glacier. From Camp 3 Arupam Das and Sherpas Gyalgen, and Tashi climbed the southeast face of Bidhan Parvat.

== Neighboring and subsidiary peaks ==
neighboring or subsidiary peaks of Bidhan Parbat:

- Kamet: 7,756 m (25,446 ft)30°55′12″N 79°35′30″E
- Mana Peak: 7,272 m (23,858 ft)30°52′50″N 79°36′55″E
- Mana Northwest: 7,092 m (23,268 ft)30°53′37″N 79°35′57″E
- Mandir Parbat: 6,559 m (21,519 ft)30°49′40″N 79°36′14″E

== Glaciers and rivers ==
Sem Kharak Glacier on the east, Deoban Glacier and Bankund Glacier on the south and Purbi Kamet Glacier on the north side of Bidhan Parbat. The River Dhauli Ganga emerges from Purbi Kamet Glacier and met Alaknanda River at Vishnu Prayag an 82 km journey from its mouth. Alaknanda river is one of the main tributaries of river Ganga. From Deoban and Bankund glacier emerges Amrit Ganga which after a short run joins Dhauli Ganga.

== See also ==
- List of Himalayan peaks of Uttarakhand
