= Mandir Parbat =

Mountain in Uttarakhand, India

- Location within Uttarakhand

Highest point
- Elevation: 6,559 m (21,519 ft)
- Prominence: 807 m (2,648 ft)
- Coordinates: 30°49′40″N 79°36′14″E

Geography
- Location: Uttarakhand, India
- Parent range: Garhwal Himalaya

Climbing
- First ascent: In 1981 by an Indian team.

Mandir Parbat is a mountain of the Garhwal Himalaya in Uttarakhand India. The elevation of Mandir Parbat is 6,559 metres (21,519 ft) and its prominence is 807 metres (2,648 ft). It is joint 73rd highest located entirely within the Uttrakhand. Nanda Devi, is the highest mountain in this category. It lies 10. 3 km south of Kamet 7,756 metres (25,446 ft). Its nearest higher neighbor unnamed summit 6,909 metres (22,667 ft) lies 5.7 km NE. It is located 6.1 km SW of Deoban 6,855 metres (22,490 ft) and 19 km SSE lies Hathi Parbat 6,727 metres (22,070 ft).

== Climbing history ==
An Indian team from West Bengal led by Sisir Ghosh attempted Mandir Parbat in 1978 and reached a high point 19, 960 ft. A 10-member team of West Bengal led by Shankar Biswas reached the summit on September 20, 1989. Summit was reached by Shyamal Sarkar and three HAPs Nataraj, Tendi and Tharchen. The team consisted of Subrata Banerjee, Debashish Biswas, Sanjoy Das, Dr. Sujit Guha, Ajoy Mondai, Bhaskar Mukherjee, Soumajit Roy, Shyamal Sarkar and Nishi Kanta Sen.

== Glaciers and rivers ==
Bank kund Glacier lies on the eastern side of Mandir Parbat. On the western side lies an unnamed glacier. Amrit Ganga comes from Bank kund glacier after a short run it joins Dhauli Ganga at Gamshali which later joins Alaknanda River at Vishnu Prayag one of the main tributaries of river Ganga. Alaknanda later joins Bhagirathi River the other main tributaries of river Ganga at Dev Prayag and became Ganga there after. On the western side an unnamed glacier drains down to Saraswati River which joins Alaknanda River near Mana village.

== Neighboring peaks ==
neighboring peaks of Mandir Parbat:

- Abi Gamin7,355 m (24,131 ft)30°55′57″N 79°36′09″E
- Kamet 7,756 m (25,446 ft)30°55′12″N 79°35′30″E
- Chamrao Parbat I 6,910 m (22,671 ft)30°59′24″N 79°31′45″E
- Saraswati Parbat I 6,940 m (22,769 ft)31°01′54″N 79°30′06″E
- Balbala 6,416 m (21,050 ft)31°01′25″N 79°26′02″E
- Mana Peak 7,272 m (23,858 ft)30°52′50″N 79°36′55″E
- Mana Northwest 7,092 m (23,268 ft)30°53′37″N 79°35′57″E
- Bidhan 6,520 m (21,391 ft)30°51′48″N 79°40′49″E

== See also ==
- List of Himalayan peaks of Uttarakhand
