= Deoban =

- Devban
- Location within Uttarakhand

Highest point
- Elevation: 6,855 m (22,490 ft)
- Prominence: 336 m (1,102 ft)
- Listing: Mountains of Uttarakhand
- Coordinates: 30°31′43″N 79°58′01″E

Geography
- Location: Uttarakhand, India
- Parent range: Garhwal Himalayas

Climbing
- First ascent: 4 August 1937 by a British team

Deoban (Hindi: देवबन) is a mountain of Garhwal Himalayas in Uttarakhand, India. Deoban stands at 6855 meter 22490 feet. Its joint 28th highest located entirely within the uttrakhand India. Nanda Devi, is the highest mountain in this category. Deoban is the 396th highest peak in the world. Deoban located just south east of Mana Peak and west of Bidhan. on the south west side lies the Mandir Parbat.

== Climbing history ==
The first ascent of Deoban was by Frank Smythe's British party on 4 August 1937. A twelve-member Indian Military Academy team climbed Deoban in 1968. On 28 August 2009, a nine-member team of Ordinance Factories Mountaineers & Trekkers from west Bengal Led by Samrat Basu, reached the summit. In the post monsoon season approached Deoban from the Amrit Ganga valley. They established their base camp on the right bank of Amrit Ganga at Eri Udiyar. Camp 3 was established on Upper Bidhan glacier and summit camp at 6320 meter. They climbed the northwest ridge and finally reached via the west ridge. On 28 August, Samrat Basu with Ashim Ghosh, Tapas Dey, Prosenjit Bagchi along with 4 high altitude supporters reached the summit.The four team members became the first Indian civilian team to reach the summit of the peak .

== Glaciers and rivers ==
It is surrounded by glaciers on both sides, the Purbi Kamet Glacier, on the northern side and the Bidhan Glacier on the southern side. The River Dhauli Ganga emerges from Purbi Kamet Glacier and meets the Alaknanda river at Vishnu Prayag an 82 km journey from its mouth. Alaknanda river is one of the main tributaries of Ganga.

== Neighboring peaks ==
The neighboring peaks of Deoban:

- Kamet: 7,756 m (25,446 ft)30°55′12″N 79°35′30″E
- Mana Peak: 7,272 m (23,858 ft)30°52′50″N 79°36′55″E
- Mana Northwest: 7,092 m (23,268 ft)30°53′37″N 79°35′57″E
- Bidhan: 6,520 m (21,391 ft)30°51′48″N 79°40′49″E
- Mandir Parbat: 6,559 m (21,519 ft)30°49′40″N 79°36′14″E
