= Meade Nunatak =

Nunatak in Coats Land, Antarctica

Meade Nunatak (80°23′S 21°58′W) is a nunatak 3 nautical miles (6 km) north of Blanchard Hill, rising to 990 metres (3,250 ft) in the Pioneers Escarpment, Shackleton Range, Antarctica. It was photographed from the air by the U.S. Navy, 1967, and was surveyed by the British Antarctic Survey, 1968–71. In association with the names of pioneers of polar life and travel grouped in this area, it was named by the UK Antarctic Place-Names Committee in 1971 after English mountaineer Charles Francis Meade, the designer of the Meade tent.
