= Saraswati Parbat I =

- Location within Uttarakhand

Highest point
- Elevation: 6,940 m (22,770 ft)
- Prominence: 871 m (2,858 ft)
- Coordinates: 31°01′54″N 79°30′06″E

Geography
- Location: Uttarakhand, India
- Parent range: Garhwal Himalaya

Climbing
- First ascent: The first ascent by an Indo-Japanese Ladies' Expedition. The summit was climbed on 18 August 1992.

Saraswati Parbat I or (Hindi: सरस्वती पर्वत I) is a mountain in Uttarakhand India. It's the joint 45th highest located entirely within the India. Nanda Devi, is the highest mountain in this category. Saraswati Parbat I is 311th highest peak in the world. The summits is 6940 meter or 22769 feet. It falls under Kamet Zaskar Range. It was first attempted by an Indo-Japanese Ladies' Expedition.Led by Santosh Yadav, (leader), Reiko Terasawa (Japanese leader).

== Climbing history ==
It was first climbed by an Indo-Japanese Ladies' Expedition.Led by Santosh Yadav, (leader) and Reiko Terasawa (Japanese leader) on 18 August 1992. The other members are Rita Patel, (doctor) Alpana Pangtey, (LO), Takako Kato, Mayumi Shirasawa, Emiko Yamaguchi, Yoshie Kameda, Eri Kusuda (Japanese), Jyotica Negi, Bhanita Timungpi, Mamata Thakur (Indian). Indian team was the first to reach the summit on 18 August 1992 at 4 pm, following day on 19 August Japanese team also reached the summit. They established 3 camps to reach the summit.

== Neighboring and subsidiary peaks ==
Saraswati Parbat I neighboring or subsidiary peaks:

- Kamet, 7,756 m (25,446 ft), 30°55′12″N 79°35′30″E
- Mukut Parbat, 7,242 m (23,760 ft), 30°56′57″N 79°34′12″E
- Abi Gamin, 7,355 m (24,131 ft)30°56′59″N 79°14′30″E
- Chamrao Parbat I, 6,910 m (24,131 ft)30°59′24″N 79°31′45″E

== Glaciers and rivers ==
The Balbala Glacier. Saraswati River.

== See also ==
- List of Himalayan peaks of Uttarakhand
