= Kedarnath =

Town in Uttarakhand, India

Kedarnath Kedarkhand
- Town
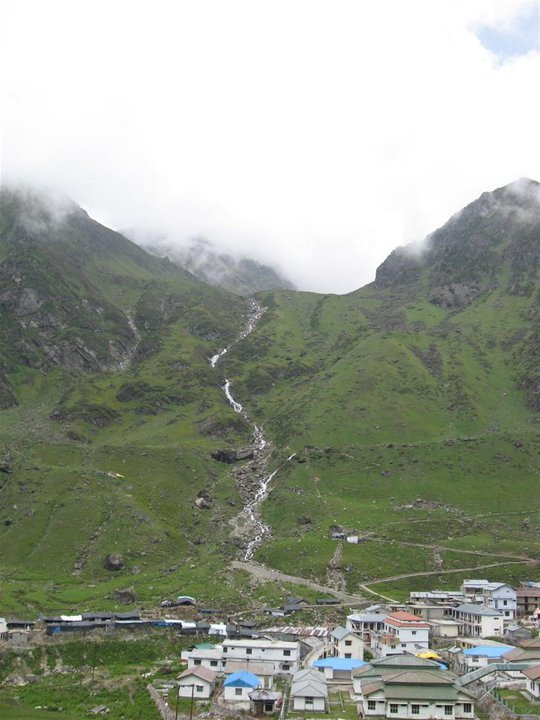
- A view of Kedarnath

- Location in Uttarakhand, India Kedarnath (India)
- Coordinates: 30°44′N 79°04′E
- Country: India
- State: Uttarakhand
- District: Rudraprayag
- Named for: Kedarnath Temple

Government
  - Type: Nagar Panchayat
  - Body: Kedarnath Nagar Panchayat

Area
  - Total: 2.75 km^{2} (1.06 sq mi)
- Elevation: 3,583 m (11,755 ft)

Population (2011)
  - Total: 612
  - Density: 223/km^{2} (576/sq mi)

Language
  - Official: Hindi
  - Additional official: Sanskrit
  - Regional: Garhwali
- Time zone: UTC+5:30 (IST)
- PIN: 246445
- Vehicle registration: UK-13
- Website: badrinath-kedarnath.gov.in

Kedarnath is a town and Nagar Panchayat in the Rudraprayag district of Uttarakhand, India, known primarily for the Kedarnath Temple. It is approximately 86.5 kilometres from Rudraprayag, the district headquarters. Kedarnath is the most remote of the four Chota Char Dham pilgrimage sites. It is located in the Himalayas, about 3,583 m (11,755 ft) above sea level near the Chorabari Glacier, which is the source of the Mandakini River. The town is flanked by snow-capped peaks, most prominently the Kedarnath Mountain. The nearest roadhead is at Gaurikund about 16 km away. The town suffered extensive destruction during the June 2013 from the flash floods caused by torrential rains in Uttarakhand.

== Etymology ==
The name "Kedarnath" means "the Lord of the Field". It is derived from the Sanskrit words kedara ("field") and natha ("lord"). The text Kashi Kedara Mahatmya states that it is so called because "the crop of liberation" grows here.

== History ==
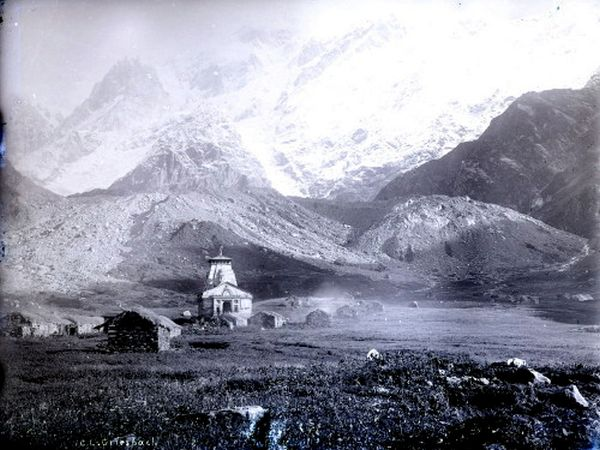
Kedarnath in the 1860s, with the temple being the prominent structure.

Kedarnath is a pilgrimage site or tirtha dedicated to the Hindu deity Shiva. It is one of the prominent pilgrimage sites that form part of the Uttarakhand Char Dham Yatra, also known as the Chota Char Dham yatra. The temple's construction is credited to the Pandava brothers mentioned in the Mahabharata. However, the Mahabharata does not mention any place called Kedarnath. One of the earliest references to Kedarnath occurs in the Skanda Purana (c. 7th-8th century), which names Kedara (Kedarnath) as the place where Shiva released the holy waters of Ganga from his matted hair, resulting in the formation of the Ganges River.

The temple was rebuilt by Adi Shankaracharya. According to the hagiographies based on Madhava's Sankshepa-Shankara-Vijaya, the 8th-century philosopher Adi Shankaracharya died near the Kedarnath mountains; although other hagiographies, based on Anandagiri's Prachina-Shankara-Vijaya, state that he died at Kanchipuram. The ruins of a monument marking the purported resting place of Adi Shankaracharya are located at Kedarnath. Kedarnath was a prominent pilgrimage centre by the 12th century when it was mentioned in the Kritya-kalpataru written by the Gahadavala minister Bhatta Lakshmidhara.

== Geography ==
=== Location ===
Kedarnath is located at a distance of 223 km from Rishikesh in Uttarakhand and close to the source of the Mandakini River at the height of 3,583 m (11,755 ft) above sea level. The township is built on a barren stretch of land on the shores of Mandakini River. Behind the town and the Kedarnath Temple, stands Kedarnath peak at 6,940 m (22,769 ft), the Kedar Dome at 6,831 m (22,411 ft) and other peaks of the range.

=== Climate ===
The Kedarnath Temple is closed during the winter months due to heavy snowfall. For six months, from November to April, the palanquin with the Utsava Murti (Idol) of Kedarnath and of the Madhyamaheshwar Temple is brought to the Omkareshwar Temple in Ukhimath, near Guptakashi. Priests and other summer-time residents also move to nearby villages to cope with the winter. Around 360 families of the Tirtha Purohit of 55 villages and other nearby villages are dependent on the town for livelihood. According to the Köppen-Geiger climate classification system, Kedarnath's climate is monsoon-influenced subarctic climate (Dwc), bordering a uniform rainfall subarctic climate (Dfc) with mild, rainy summers and cold, snowy winters.

Climate data for Kedarnath, Uttarakhand
Month	Jan	Feb	Mar	Apr	May	Jun	Jul	Aug	Sep	Oct	Nov	Dec	Year
Mean daily maximum °C (°F)	1.0 (33.8)	2.4 (36.3)	6.0 (42.8)	10.8 (51.4)	14.8 (58.6)	17.1 (62.8)	16.5 (61.7)	15.9 (60.6)	14.3 (57.7)	10.6 (51.1)	6.9 (44.4)	3.7 (38.7)	10.0 (50.0)
Daily mean °C (°F)	−3.7 (25.3)	−2.3 (27.9)	1.2 (34.2)	5.6 (42.1)	9.3 (48.7)	11.9 (53.4)	12.3 (54.1)	12.0 (53.6)	9.8 (49.6)	5.3 (41.5)	1.6 (34.9)	−1.4 (29.5)	5.1 (41.2)
Mean daily minimum °C (°F)	−8.4 (16.9)	−6.9 (19.6)	−3.5 (25.7)	0.5 (32.9)	3.8 (38.8)	6.8 (44.2)	8.2 (46.8)	8.1 (46.6)	5.3 (41.5)	0.1 (32.2)	−3.6 (25.5)	−6.5 (20.3)	0.3 (32.6)
Average precipitation mm (inches)	118.0 (4.65)	101.0 (3.98)	116.0 (4.57)	63.0 (2.48)	50.0 (1.97)	75.0 (2.95)	240.0 (9.45)	234.0 (9.21)	149.0 (5.87)	57.0 (2.24)	24.0 (0.94)	51.0 (2.01)	1,278 (50.32)

==== 2013 flash floods ====
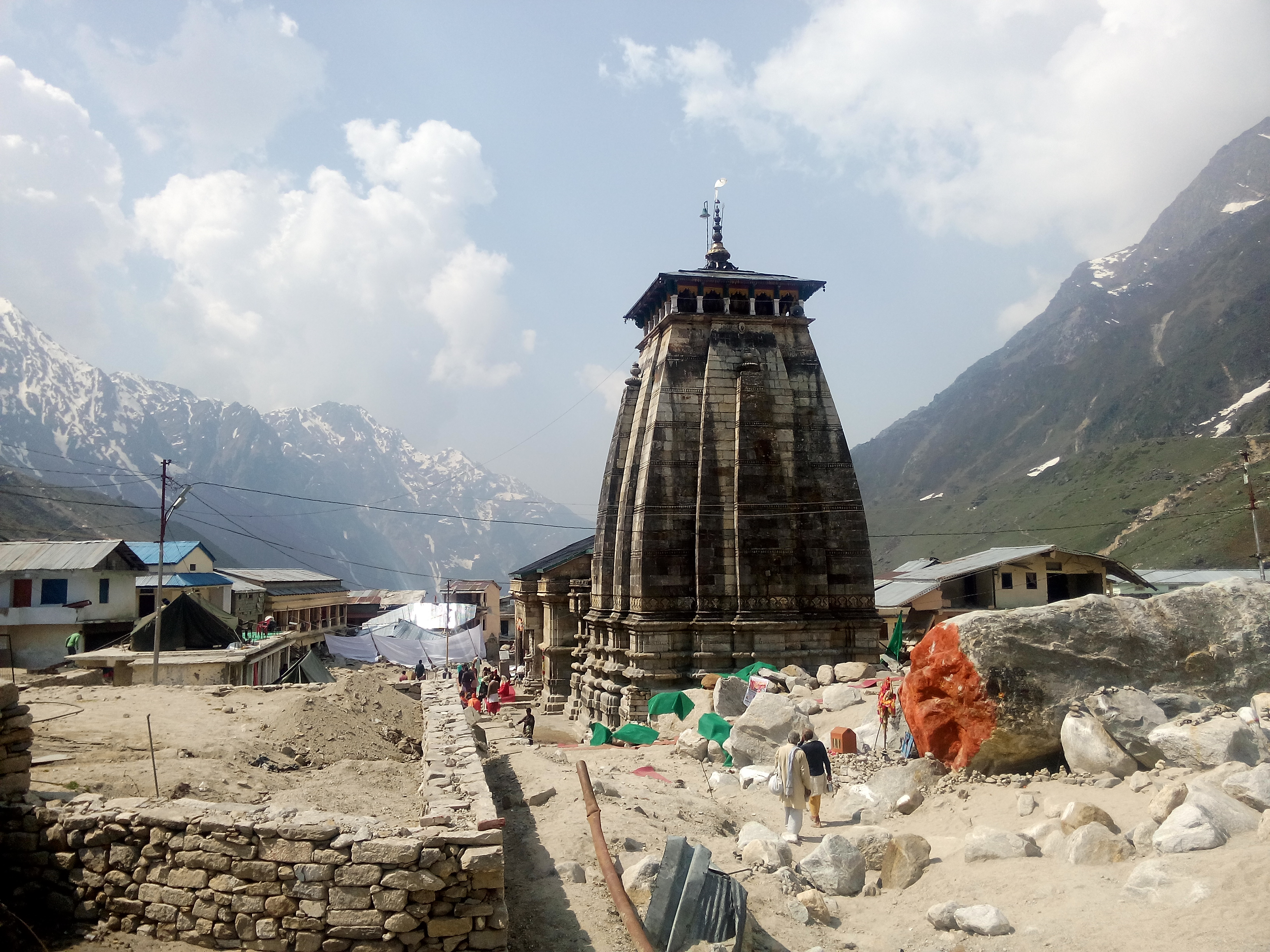
The Kedarnath Temple and the huge rock behind it in the aftermath of the flood

On 16 June 2013, at approximately 7:30 P.M., a landslide occurred near the Kedarnath Temple. On 17 June 2013 at approximately 6:40 a.m., water began to rush down from the Chorabari Tal or Gandhi Sarovar, bringing along with its flow, a huge amount of silt, rocks, and boulders. A large boulder got stuck behind the Kedarnath Temple, protecting it from the flood. The floodwater gushed on both sides of the temple, destroying everything in its path. Since it occurred in the middle of the pilgrimage season, the torrential rains, cloud bursts, and resulting flash floods nearly destroyed the town of Kedarnath. Thousands of people were killed, and thousands of others (mostly pilgrims) were reported missing or stranded due to landslides around Kedarnath. Although the surrounding area and compound of the Kedarnath Temple were destroyed, the temple itself survived.

The rescue operation resulted in more than 100,000 people being airlifted with the help of mainly the Private Helicopter Operators, who began the rescue mission voluntarily without any clear directives from the State Government or the Ministry of Defence. The Indian Army and Indian Air Force helicopters arrived much after the Private Helicopter Operators had already begun the massive air-rescue mission. The NDRF represented by a commandant, and another junior officer arrived at the 'right-ridge' of the town bordering the Mandakini River with more men and supplies being brought in the next day. The Indian Army later launched a massive rescue effort. A Eurocopter AS350 B3 helicopter, each, of the private helicopter operators - Prabhatam Aviation & Simm Samm Aviation, were lost during the rescue mission without any reported casualties. An Indian Air Force helicopter (Mil Mi-17) also crashed, killing all 20 people on board (all of them were soldiers involved in relief and rescue work). The Air Force dropped logs to build pyres for mass cremations of the victims. It was reported that previously uncollected bodies were still being found one year after the tragedy.

==== Flood-proof infrastructure plan ====
After the floods, the Government of India decided to provide a flood-free infrastructure plan for the town. This involves:

- Development of the retaining wall and ghats on the Mandakini River
- Development of the retaining wall and ghats on the Sarasvati River
- Construction of the main approach to the Kedarnath Temple
- Development of the Adi Shankaracharya Kutir and Museum
- Development of houses for the Kedarnath Teerth Purohits

The foundation stone for the plan was laid by Prime Minister Narendra Modi on 20 October 2017.

== Demographics ==
As of the 2011 India census, Kedarnath has a population of 830. Males constitute 99% of the population and females 1%. Kedarnath has an average literacy rate of 63%: male literacy is 63%, and female literacy is 36%. Out of total population, 604 were engaged in work or business activity. Of this 601 were males while 3 were females. In Kedarnath, none of the population is under six years of age. The floating population from May to October every year is more than 5000 per day with the pilgrim influx rising up to 10 lakhs in 2022.

== Places of interest ==
Other than the Kedarnath Temple, on the eastern side of the town is Bhairavnath Temple, and the deity of this temple, Bhairavnath, is believed to protect the town during the winter months. About 6 km upstream from the town, lies Chorabari Tal, a glacier-lake also called Gandhi Sarovar. Near Kedarnath, there is a cliff called Bhairav Jhamp. Other places of interest include the Kedarnath Wildlife Sanctuary, Adi Shankaracharya Samadhi, and Rudra meditation cave.

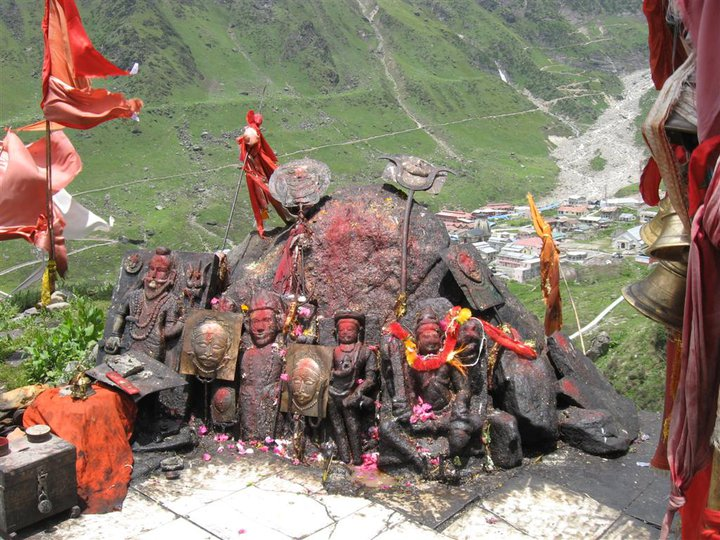
Bhairavnath is considered as the Protector God of the area

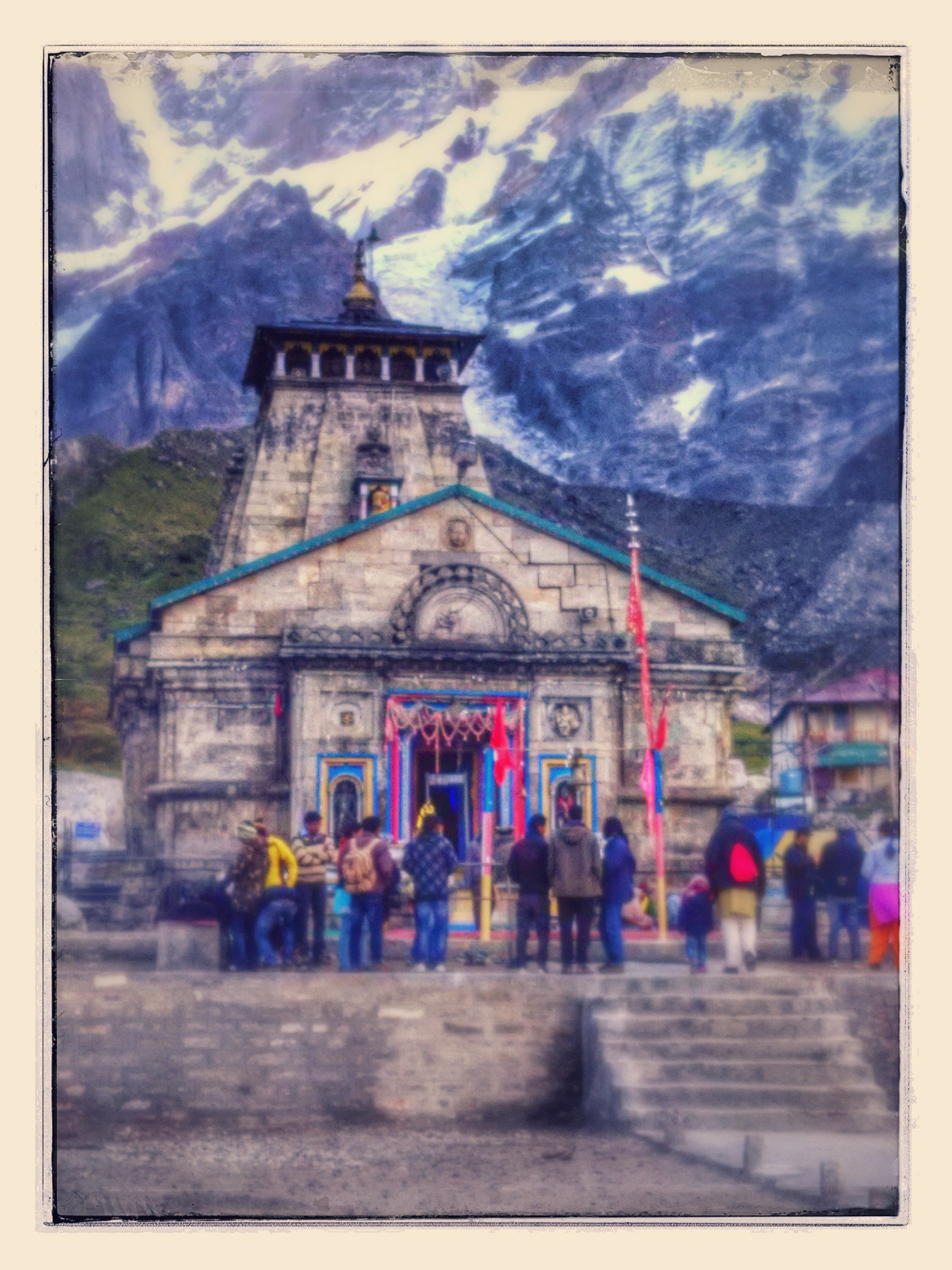
The Kedarnath Temple in 2014, one year after the floods.

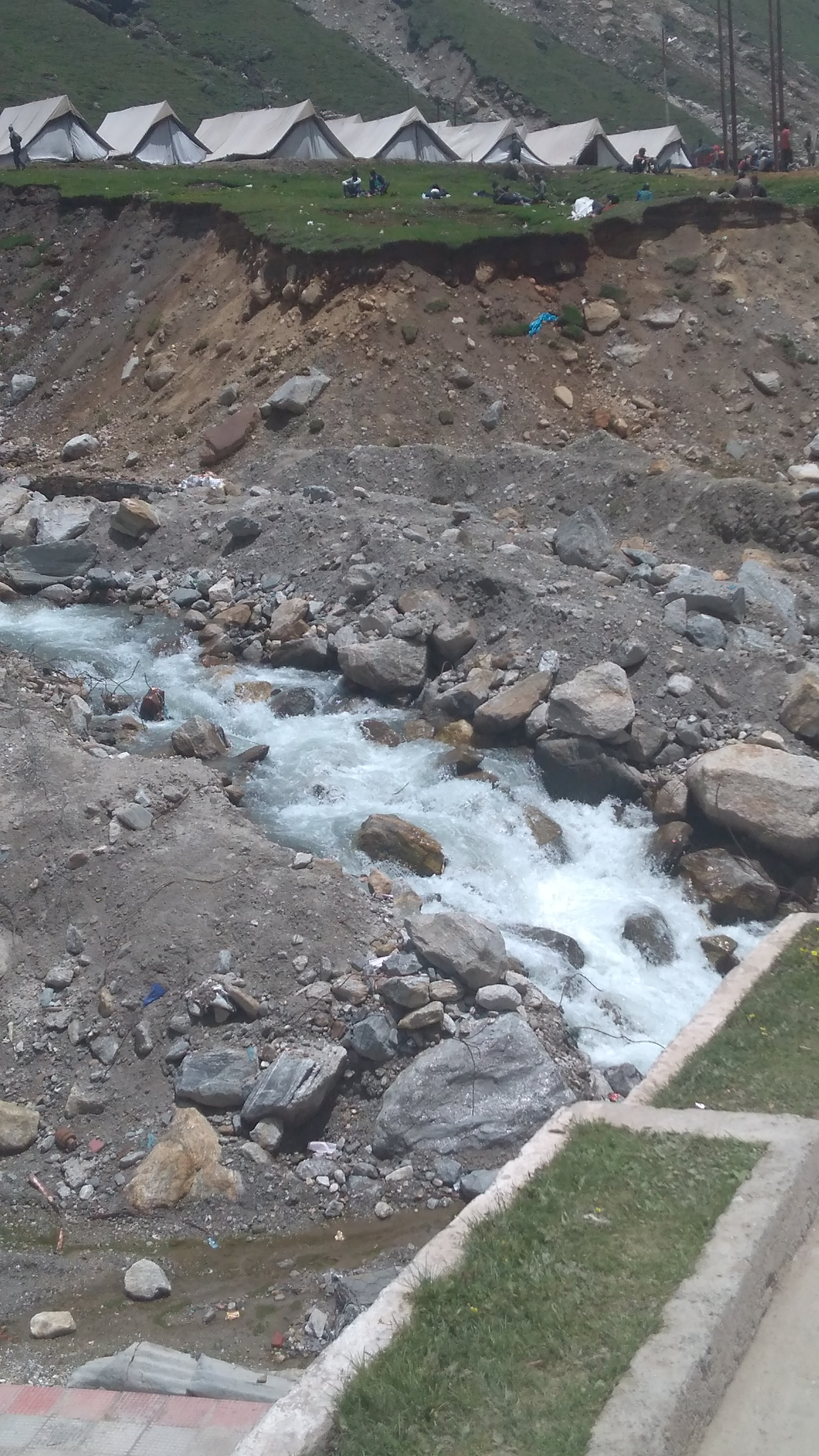
The Mandakini River on the bank of the town

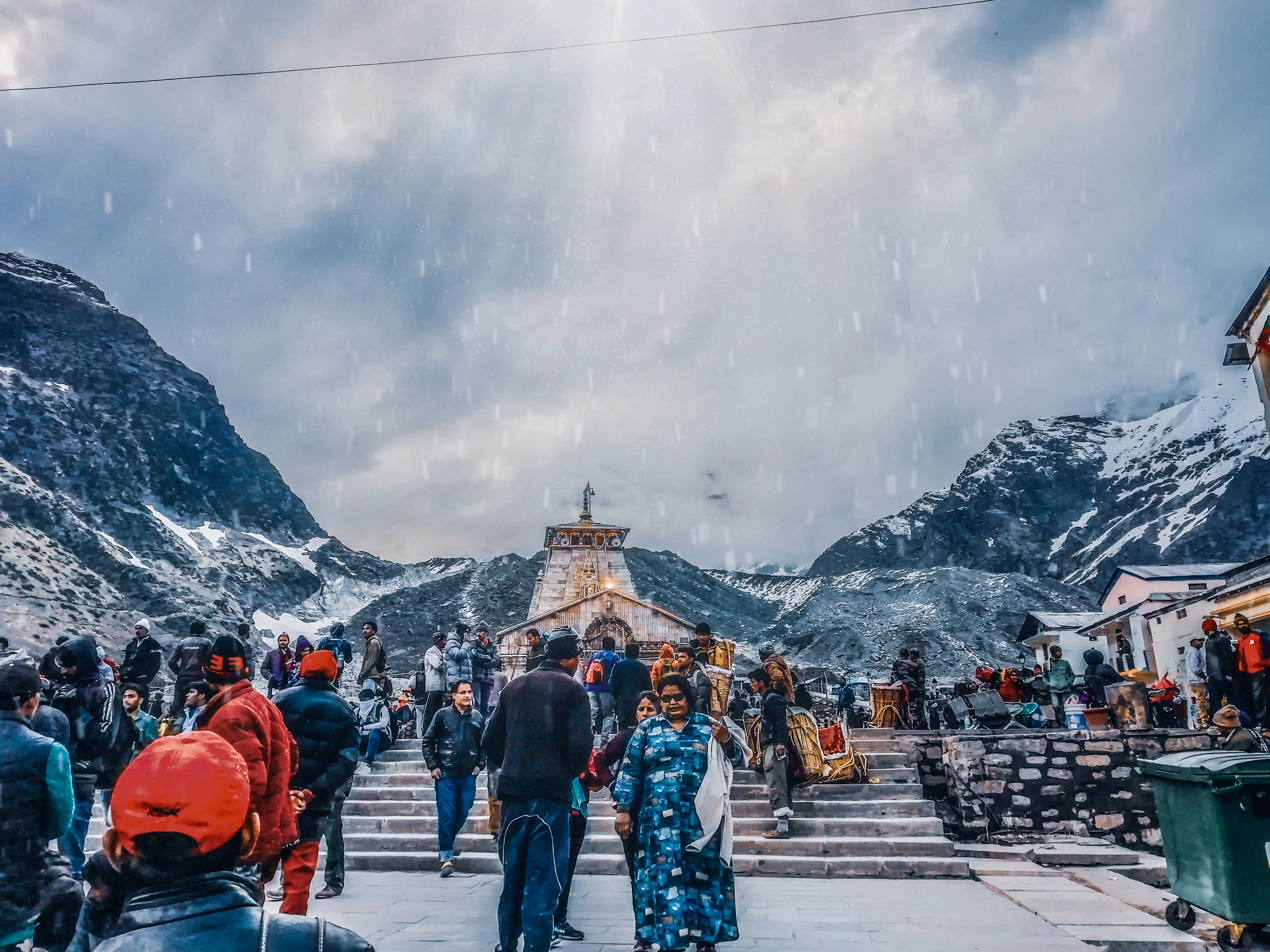
View of Kedarnath Temple during snowfall

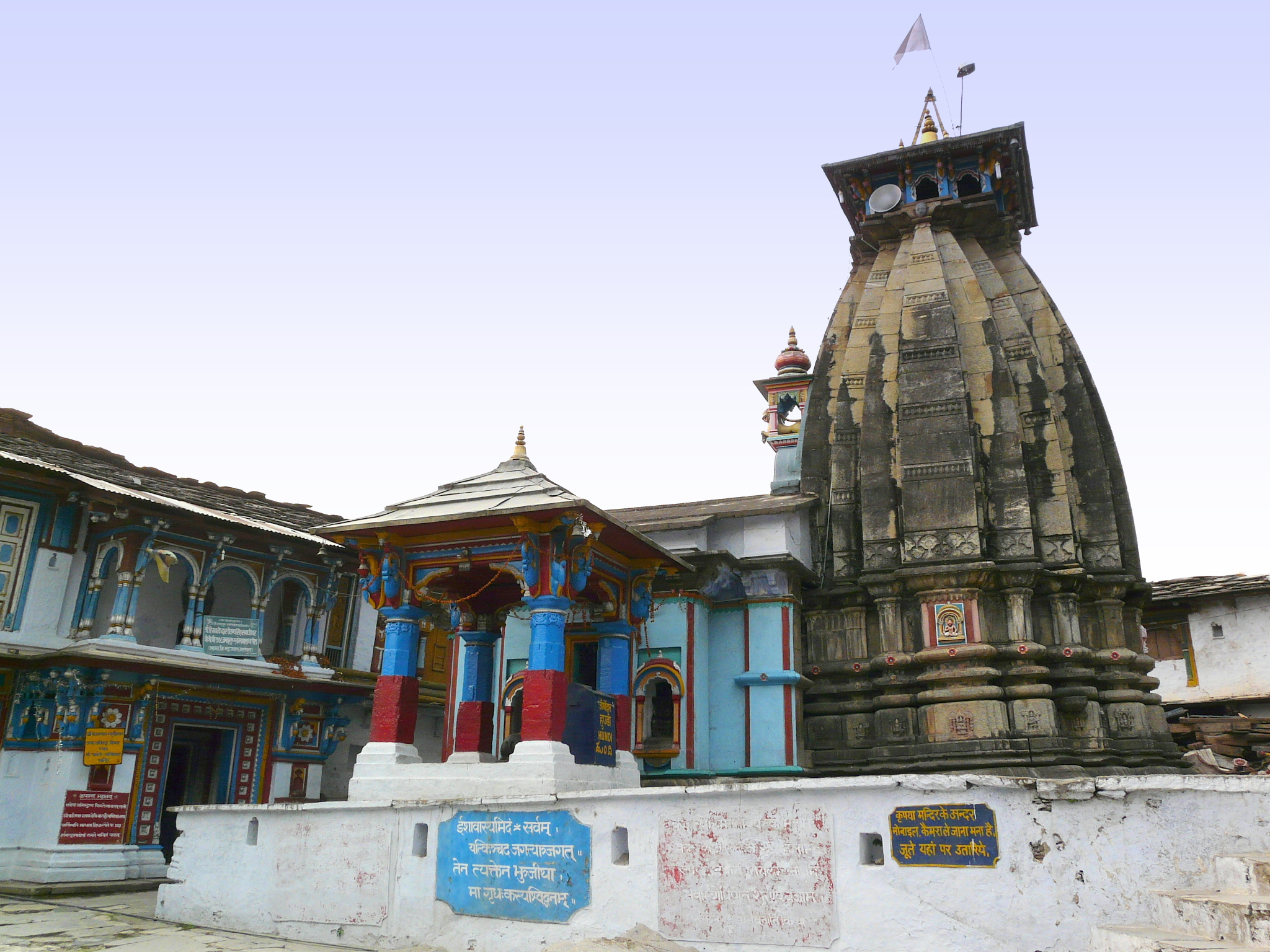
Omkareshwar Temple in Ukhimath, where the Kedarnath and Madhyamaheshwar idols are kept during the winter months.

== See also ==
- Kedarnath (mountain)
- Badrinath
- 2013 North India floods
