= Chamrao Parbat I =

Mountain in Uttarakhand, India

- Location within Uttarakhand

Highest point
- Elevation: 6,910 m (22,670 ft)
- Prominence: 618 m (2,028 ft)
- Coordinates: 30°59′24″N 79°31′45″E

Geography
- Location: Uttarakhand, India
- Parent range: Garhwal Himalaya

Chamrao Parbat I (Hindi:चमराओ पर्वत I) is a mountain of the Garhwal Himalaya in Uttarakhand India. Chamrao Parbat I standing majestically at 6,910 metres (22,671 ft). It is 22nd highest located entirely within the Uttrakhand. Nanda Devi, is the highest mountain in this category. Chamrao Parbat I lies between the Mukut Parbat and Saraswati Parbat I. It lies on the India China border. It is located 9.9 km NW of Kamet 7,756 metres (25,446 ft) and 5.3 km NNW lies Saraswati Parbat I 6,940 metres (22,769 ft).

== Glaciers and rivers ==
Near by glaciers and river

Dakshini Chamrao glacier, Balbala glacier and Paschimi Kamet glacier all the glacier drain their water in the Saraswati river which then joins Alaknanda River near Mana village one of the main tributaries of Ganga river.

== Neighboring peaks ==
Neighboring peaks of Chamrao Parbat I:

- Kamet: 7,756 m (25,446 ft)30°55′12″N 79°35′30″E
- Abi Gamin: 7,355 m (24,131 ft)30°55′57″N 79°36′09″E
- Mukut Parbat: 7,242 m (23,760 ft)30°56′57″N 79°34′12″E
- Saraswati Parbat I: 6,940 m (22,769 ft)31°01′54″N 79°30′06″E
- Balbala: 6,416 m (21,050 ft)31°01′25″N 79°26′02″E

== See also ==
- List of Himalayan peaks of Uttarakhand
