= Earle Riddiford =

New Zealand mountaineer

Harold Earle Riddiford (13 October 1921 – 26 June 1989) was a New Zealand mountaineer, lawyer and farmer who went on three mountaineering expeditions to the Himalayas in the 1950s; the first New Zealand expedition to the Garhwal Himalaya in 1951, the 1951 British Mount Everest reconnaissance expedition, and the disastrous 1952 British Cho Oyu expedition.

Two New Zealanders from the four on the Garhwal Himalaya expedition were invited to join the 1951 British expedition; Ed Cotter declined, but Riddiford and George Lowe argued about who should go. The two had to pay their own way but Lowe was broke, so Riddiford and Edmund Hillary (who had money from working on a South Island hydroelectric project) joined.

The leader of the 1952 British Cho Oyu expedition was Eric Shipton, who was disorganised and left the ordering of supplies to Riddiford. But Riddiford injured his back on Cho Oyo (while rolling rocks down the mountain with the Sherpas) so did not return to the Himalayas. He climbed in New Zealand until the 1970s, when he experienced heart problems (angina attacks).

Riddiford was a cousin of MP Dan Riddiford, who helped the family financially when his father, Frederick Earle Riddiford (1890–1921), died aged 33 in a woolshed accident. He was able to go to Hadlow Preparatory School; then Wanganui Collegiate School (1935–1938).

He studied law at the University of Canterbury and then practiced law in Christchurch. He served in the 2NZEF in World War II, with Army Intelligence in the Pacific. He climbed in Canterbury from 1941, when he climbed Mount Sefton. In 1952 he was asked to join the Wellington law firm his uncle was in.

Later he became a partner in the law firm. With his wife Rosemary, he bought the 3850 ha Orongorongo (sheep) Station between Pencarrow Head and Palliser Bay (previously owned by the Riddiford family from 1845, and now a tourist lodge) in 1963, and farmed it until 1986, commuting to the Wairarapa in the weekends. He died in Wellington, and was survived by his wife Rosemary (née Johnston) and four children.

There is a 2022 documentary about Earle Riddiford and Edmund Hillary as well as other climbers of that area. It is called "Before Everest" and it was directed by his son Richard Riddiford and with research by his daughter Anna Riddiford.
