= Edmund Cotter =

New Zealand mountaineer

Edmund Cotter

Edmund McCarthny (Ed) Cotter (15 January 1927 – 19 October 2017) was a New Zealand mountaineer who made several first ascents on the West Coast of New Zealand and was part of the team that first climbed the Maximilian Ridge on Mount Elie de Beaumont in 1951.

Cotter was a member of the 1951 New Zealand expedition to the Garhwal Himalaya, with Edmund Hillary, George Lowe and Earle Riddiford.
