= Charles Francis Meade =

English mountaineer and author

Charles Francis Meade (born 25 February 1881 – died 1975) was an English mountaineer and author.

== Early life ==
Born in England, Meade was the only surviving child of the Hon. Sir Robert Henry Meade and Caroline Georgiana Grenfell. His mother died shortly after his birth and his father before he reached the age of 17.

== Climbing ==
Meade climbed extensively in the Alps and the Himalayas, often accompanied by his guide, Pierre Blanc (d. 1966). In particular, he made a number of early attempts on Kamet, camping overnight in 1913 at Meade’s Col, at a height of 7,138 metres. He was an original member of the Mount Everest Committee. Meade Nunatak, a hill in the Antarctic, is also named after him.

Meade also developed the Meade tent, a design which was extensively used by other climbers for a number of years and at the highest camp on the first ascent of Everest.

== Personal life ==
Meade married Aileen Hilda Brodrick, the daughter of St.John Brodrick (later Earl of Midleton), by whom he had three daughters and a son. They lived in Wales, at Pen-y-Lan, near Meifod.

== Publications ==
- Approach to the Hills (John Murray, London, 1940)
- High Mountains (Harvill, London, 1954)
