= Hadlow Preparatory School =

Primary School in Masterton, New Zealand

Location
- 68 High Street, Masterton, New Zealand; 40.959177°S 175.640145°E

Information
- Type: Trinity school boys and girls (Years 1–8)
- Denomination: Anglican
- Established: 5 February 1929
- Founder: Alexander William Don 1896—1954
- Principal: Andrew Osmond
- Website: hadlow.school.nz

Hadlow Preparatory School is a state-integrated Anglican primary school in High Street, Masterton, New Zealand.

== History ==
Hadlow opened as a boarding (40 boys) and a day school (20 boys) for boys aged 8 to 14 at the beginning of 1929 under principal and founder A. W. Don. At the first break-up ceremony the prizes went to the sons of major Wairarapa landowners.

The school was purchased by Anglican girls school, St Matthew's, on Mr Don's untimely death in 1954 and Mr John Woodward Bird 1892—1970, a senior master at Wairarapa College, was appointed principal.

On Mr Bird's retirement Mr John Kenneth Louisson 1918—2001 was appointed headmaster in 1961.
