= Hathi Parbat =

Mountain in Uttarakhand, India

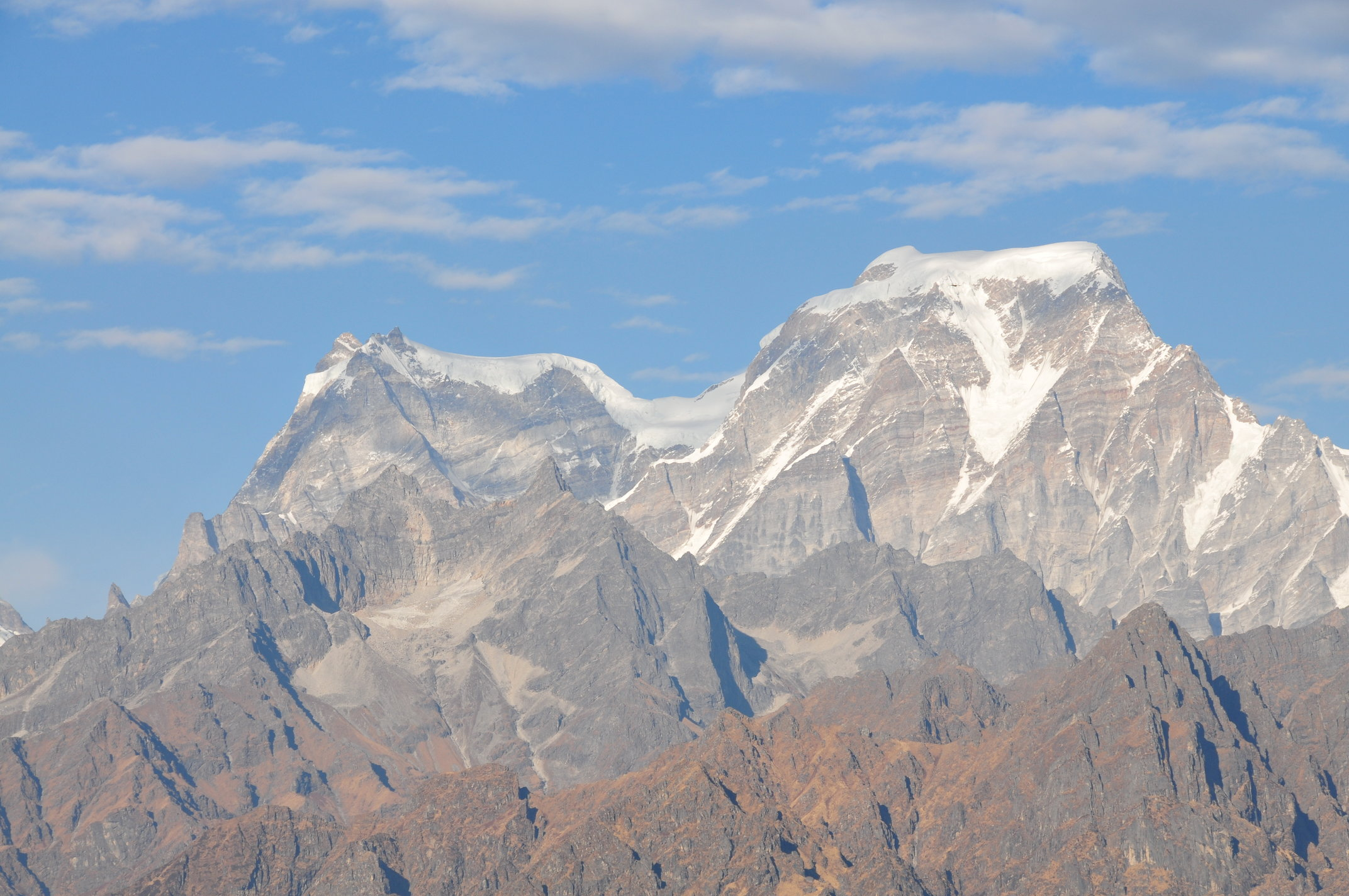
- Hathi Parbat (on the right) from Gorson Bugyal

Highest point
- Elevation: 6,727 m (22,070 ft)
- Prominence: 1,673 m (5,489 ft)
- Listing: Ultra
- Coordinates: 30°41′06″N 79°42′21″E

Geography
- Location within India
- Location: Uttarakhand, India
- Parent range: Garhwal Himalaya

Hathi Parbat, also known as Elephant Peak, is a mountain in the Garhwal Himalayas in India. It is located in the Chamoli district of Uttarakhand state. Its summit has an elevation of 6,727 metres (22,070 ft).

== Legend ==
Two huge rocks on a spur of Hathi Parbat are described as a crow (Kakabhushundi) and an eagle (Garuda). It is believed that the crow is animatedly conversing with eagle on the affairs of the universe as it is described in Ramayana. Another version has it that a learned Brahmin of Ayodhya once incurred the wrath of the sage Lomasa who lived here and was changed into the form of crow by the sage.

== Access ==
Hathi Parbat can be reached from Vishnuprayag or Ghangaria, which is close to Valley of Flowers. The approach from Ghangaria is a little easier but longer. From Govindghat, there is an 18 km bridle path which runs through the Bhyundar valley and Bhyundar village up to Ghanghariya. Kakbhushundi Tal & Guari Parvat Lies in the vicinity of Hathi Parbat. Nearby places are Bhyundar, Jelam, Shyama and Juma. The Dhauliganga River flows nearby.

== First Ascent ==
An Indian team comprising Sonam Gyatso, Lt. Kaushal, H. C. Rawat, Thondup Tsering, Lakpa Tensing, D. S. Sisodia, Dawa Norbu and Sonam Wangyal made the first ascent of Hathi Parbat (22,070 feet) On 6 and 7 June 1963.

== See also ==
- List of mountains in India
- List of Himalayan peaks of Uttarakhand
- List of ultras of the Himalayas
