= Mukut Parbat =

Mountain in Uttarakhand India

- Location within Uttarakhand

Highest point
- Elevation: 7,242 m (23,760 ft); Ranked 96th
- Prominence: 840 m (2,760 ft)
- Listing: Ultra; Mountains of Uttarakhand
- Coordinates: 30°57′08″N 79°34′13″E

Geography
- Location: Chamoli, Uttarakhand, India
- Parent range: Garhwal Himalaya

Climbing
- First ascent: 1951 by a team from New Zealand. First summiteers are Cotter, Pasang Dawa Lama and Riddiford

Mukut Parbat or Mukut Parvat (Hindi: मुकुट पर्वत) is a mountain in Uttarakhand India, and the 20th highest located entirely within India. Nanda Devi, is the highest mountain in this category. Mukut Parbat is the 96th highest peak in the world. There are two summits, the main peak is 7,242 m (23,760 ft) and other one (Mukut Parbat East) is 7,130 m (23,392 ft). It lies the Kamet Zaskar Range, which does not receive the heavy monsoon.

== Climbing history ==
Mukut Parbat was first climbed in 1951 by a team from New Zealand through its sharp and steep western ridge. Edmund Cotter, Pasang Dawa Lama and Earle Riddiford reached its summit from the Dakhini Chamrao glacier which joins the Saraswati from the east. An Indian army led expedition in 1989 attempted the western ridge but several summit attempts were thwarted by high winds and cold.

An Indian expedition from the Nehru Institute of Mountaineering made the first ascent of Mukut Parbat East in 1999. A South Korean expedition in 1998 claimed to have made the first ascent of the East summit. However, when the South Korean team leader reviewed photos and reports from the 1999 team, the leader realized their error and confirmed the South Koreans had mistaken a lower summit as the true Eastern summit.

== Neighboring and subsidiary peaks ==
Mukut Parbat is surrounded by three principal neighboring or subsidiary peaks:

- Abi Gamin, 7,355 m (24,131 ft), prominence = 217 m 30°55′57″N 79°36′09″E
- Kamet, 7,756 m (25,446 ft), prominence = 2825 m 30°55′12″N 79°35′30″E
- Chamrao Parbat 6,910 m (22,670 ft) 30°59′24″N 79°31′45″E

== Glaciers and rivers ==
The West (Paschimi) Kamet Glacier. The branches of the West Kamet Glacier head on the western slopes of Kamet, Abi Gamin, and Mukut Parbat and Dakhini Chamrao glacier
