= Saraswati River (Uttarakhand) =

River in India

Coordinates: 30.7705°N 79.4949°E

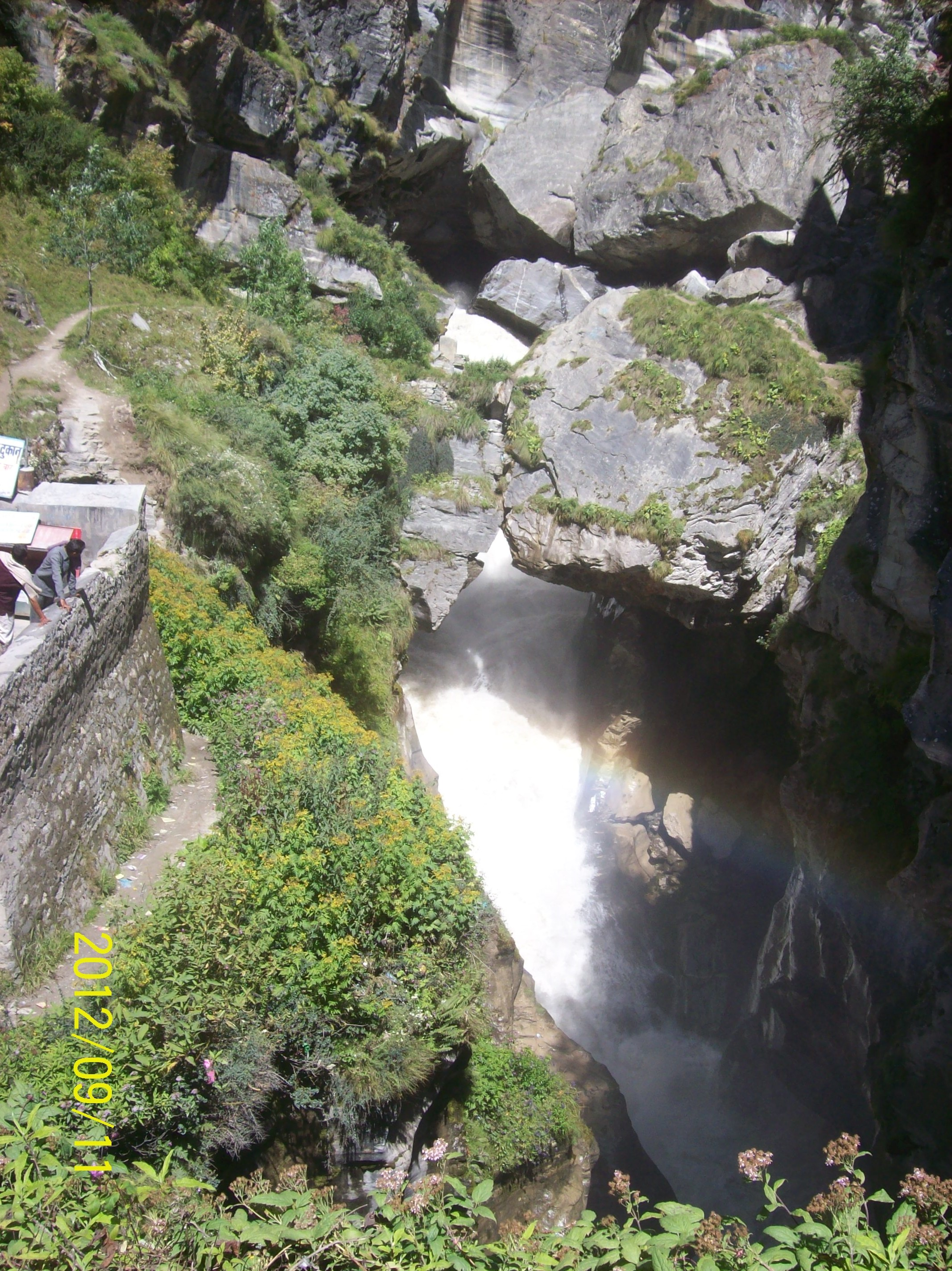
Saraswati River

Saraswati River is a tributary of Alaknanda River flowing in Uttarakhand State, India. It joins Alaknanda River at Keshav Prayag, near Mana village, Badrinath. The confluence of rivers Alaknanda and Bhagirathi at Devprayag in the state of Uttarakhand, forms and flows as river Ganga or the Ganges from the point forward. A natural stone bridge, named Bhim Pul, lays across the flowing Saraswati river, making a passage towards Vasudhara falls and Satopanth Lake. Many locals believe that Bhim Pul is a rock bridge founded by Bhima of Mahabharatha, to help Draupadi cross the rivulet.
