= Mana Peak =

5th highest mountain in Uttarakhand

- Location within India Location within Uttarakhand

Highest point
- Elevation: 7,274 m (23,865 ft); Ranked 91st
- Listing: Ultra; List of Indian states and territories by highest point
- Coordinates: 30°52′52″N 79°36′50″E

Geography
- Location: Mana, Uttarakhand, India
- Parent range: Garhwal Himalayas

Climbing
- First ascent: August 1937 by Frank Smythe
- Easiest route: glacier/snow/ice climb

Mana Peak (Hindi: मना पर्वत) is a mountain in India. It is the 5th highest mountain located entirely within Uttarakhand. Nanda Devi is the highest mountain in this category. There are two known approaches to Mana Peak: one is the eastern approach through East Kamet glacier and the other is the southern approach through Nagthuni and Banke Kund glacier.

Mana Peak was first climbed solo in 1937 by Frank Smythe during his famous Valley of Flowers expedition.
