= Abi Gamin =

Mountain in Uttarakhand, India

- Location within India

Highest point
- Elevation: 7,355 m (24,131 ft)
- Prominence: 217 m (712 ft)
- Listing: Mountains of Uttarakhand
- Coordinates: 30°55′59″N 79°36′09″E

Geography
- Location: Chamoli, Uttarakhand, India; Ngari, Tibet
- Parent range: Garhwal Himalayas

Climbing
- First ascent: 22 August 1950 by R. Dittert, A. Tissieres and G. Chevalley (Anglo-Swiss)
- Easiest route: Southwest ridge via Meade's Col (glacier/snow climb)

Abi Gamin (also known as Ibi Gamin) is a Himalayan mountain peak mostly situated in the Chamoli district of Uttarakhand state in India, roughly 2 km (1.2 mi) northeast of Kamet. Its summit is on the border with Tibet and its northern slope is in the Ngari Prefecture of Tibet.

Abi Gamin is located in the central Himalayas and at the culminating point of the Zaskar Range. It is situated on the watershed of the upper Alaknanda and Dhauli rivers between the famous Manna and Niti passes on the Indo-Tibetan border.

It is not particularly independent, lying as it does close to the higher peak of Kamet, and separated from it by the high saddle known as Meade's Col, 7,138 m (23,419 ft).

Abi Gamin was surveyed (along with the rest of the group) by Richard Strachey in 1848; this was the first time that the great heights of these peaks was recognized. In 1855, the Schlagintweit brothers named this range as Western, Central and Eastern Abi Gamin. These correspond to Mukut Parbat, Kamet and Abi Gamin.

== Climbing history ==
The first attempt to climb Kamet was launched by Adolf and Robert Schlagintweit from the Tibetan side up the NE ridge: they estimated that in August 1855 they reached an altitude of 22,239 or 22,259 ft (6,785 m) on Kamet, though they were in fact attempting to climb Abi Gamin. Their attempt resulted in an at the time widely acknowledged altitude record.

During the 1874-77 survey by the Survey of India under E. C. Ryall, I. S. Pocock set up a plane table at c.22050' on the West flank of Abi Gamin.

Between 1907 and 1913 a number of expeditions attempting Kamet reached high altitudes on the flanks of this mountain. Tom George Longstaff in 1907 recced the Purbi(East) Kamet approaches, and C. F. Meade's team followed the same route in 1913 to reach Meade's Col up the East flank of the massif. The attempts by A.M.Slingsby in 1911 and 1913 and C.F.Meade in 1912 were up the West flank from the Pachhmi(West) Kamet glacier. These reached Slingsby's Col(c.21000') between Mukut Parbat and Abi Gamin, but failed to go beyond c.23000'.

Abi Gamin was climbed for the first time in 1950 by a small Anglo-Swiss Expedition comprising Alfred Tissières, R. Dittert, and G. Chevalley (all Swiss), and Englishman Kenneth Berrill. They approached from the north side through Tibet, reached over the Mana Pass. Their NE ridge route was the same route the Schlagintweit's had tried nearly a century earlier! The summit was reached by the three Swiss members: they may have been accompanied by Sherpa Dawa Thondup.

Indian expeditions under Nandu Jayal climbed the peak in 1953 and 1955 by the SW ridge from Meade's Col, reached up the East flank of the massif from the Purbi Kamet glacier. Later ascents have been up this route.

== Neighbouring peaks ==
Nearby peaks include Mukut Parbat, Kamet and Mana. All three peaks are linked by a ridge.

== Routes ==
- NE Ridge (by Mana pass and Mang Gang glacier).
- Purbi Kamet glacier, Meade's col, South face or SW ridge.
- North West Ridge.
