= Kamet =

Second highest mountain in Uttarakhand, India

कामेत पर्वत Kamet
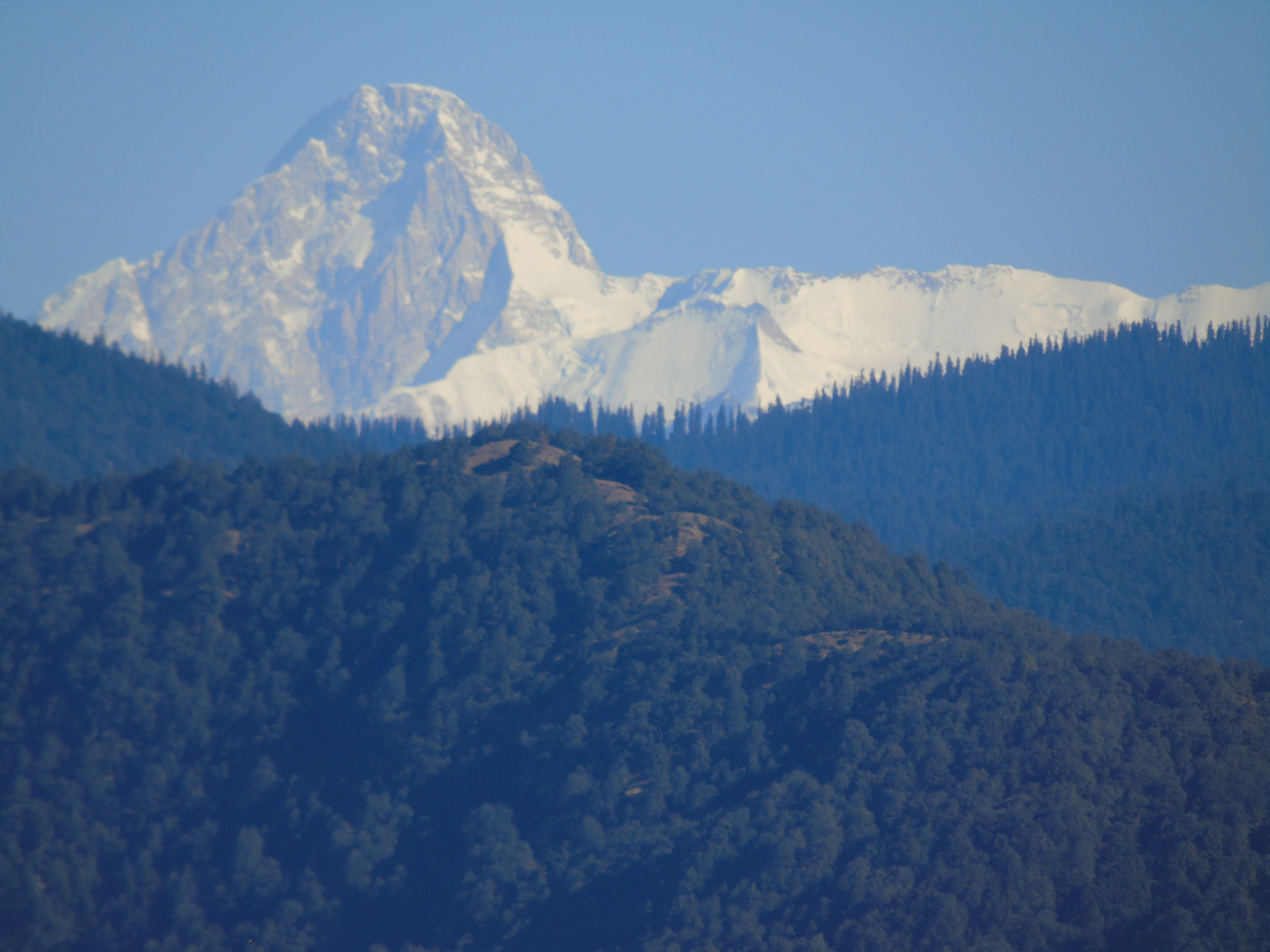
- Kamet

Highest point
- Elevation: 7,756 m (25,446 ft); Ranked 29th
- Prominence: 2,825 m (9,268 ft); Ranked 121st
- Listing: Ultra Mountains of Uttarakhand
- Coordinates: 30°55′12″N 79°35′30″E

Geography
- The major peaks (not mountains) above 7,500 m (24,600 ft) height in Himalayas, rank identified in Himalayas alone (not the world). Legend: 1：Mount Everest; 2：Kangchenjunga; 3：Lhotse; 4：Yalung Kang, Kanchenjunga West; 5：Makalu; 6：Kangchenjunga South; 7：Kangchenjunga Central; 8：Cho Oyu; 9：Dhaulagiri; 10：Manaslu (Kutang); 11：Nanga Parbat (Diamer); 12：Annapurna; 13：Shishapangma (Shishasbangma, Xixiabangma); 14：Manaslu East; 15：Annapurna East Peak; 16： Gyachung Kang; 17：Annapurna II; 18：Tenzing Peak (Ngojumba Kang, Ngozumpa Kang, Ngojumba Ri); 19：Kangbachen; 20：Himalchuli (Himal Chuli); 21：Ngadi Chuli (Peak 29, Dakura, Dakum, Dunapurna); 22：Nuptse (Nubtse); 23：Nanda Devi; 24：Chomo Lonzo (Chomolonzo, Chomolönzo, Chomo Lönzo, Jomolönzo, Lhamalangcho); 25：Namcha Barwa (Namchabarwa); 26：Zemu Kang (Zemu Gap Peak); 27：Kamet; 28：Dhaulagiri II; 29：Ngojumba Kang II; 30：Dhaulagiri III; 31：Kumbhakarna Mountain (Mount Kumbhakarna, Jannu); 32：Gurla Mandhata (Naimona'nyi, Namu Nan); 33：Hillary Peak (Ngojumba Kang III); 34：Molamenqing (Phola Gangchen); 35：Dhaulagiri IV; 36：Annapurna Fang; 37：Silver Crag; 38：Kangbachen Southwest; 39：Gangkhar Puensum (Gangkar Punsum); 40：Annapurna III; 41：Himalchuli West; 42：Annapurna IV; 43：Kula Kangri; 44：Liankang Kangri (Gangkhar Puensum North, Liangkang Kangri); 45：Ngadi Chuli South; Location in Uttarakhand
- Location: Uttarakhand, India
- Parent range: Garhwal Himalaya

Climbing
- First ascent: 21 June 1931 by Frank Smythe, Eric Shipton, R.L. Holdsworth and Lewa Sherpa
- Easiest route: glacier/snow/ice climb

Kamet (Hindi: कामेत) is the second-highest mountain in the Garhwal region of Uttarakhand, India, after Nanda Devi. It is the 29th-highest mountain in the world. It lies in the Chamoli District of Uttarakhand. Its appearance resembles a giant pyramid topped by a flat summit area with two peaks.

== Climbing ==
Due to its position near the Tibetan Plateau, Kamet is very remote and not as accessible as some Himalayan peaks. It also receives a great deal of wind from the Plateau. However, by modern standards, it is a relatively straightforward ascent for such a high mountain. Early explorers of the region faced long approach marches of around 200 miles (321.9 km) from Ranikhet through dense mountain forest; access is easier today.

While attempts to climb Kamet began in 1855, the first ascent was not made until 1931 by Frank Smythe, Eric Shipton, R.L. Holdsworth, Raymond Greene, the expedition's doctor, Bill Birnie and Lewa Sherpa, members of a British expedition. Kamet was the first peak over 25,000 ft (7,620 m) to be climbed, and was the highest summit reached until the first ascent of Nanda Devi five years later. However, far higher non-summit altitudes had been reached on the north side of Mount Everest in the 1920s.

The standard route begins from the East Kamet (or Purbi Kamet) Glacier, ascending via Meade's Col (c. 7,100m/23,300 ft), the saddle between Kamet and its northern outlier Abi Gamin. From Meade's Col the route ascends the northeast edge of the north face. The ascent to Meade's col involves steep gullies, a rock wall, and several glacier climbs. Five camps are usually placed en route. The final ascent to the summit involves steep snow, possibly icy.

== Neighboring and subsidiary peaks ==
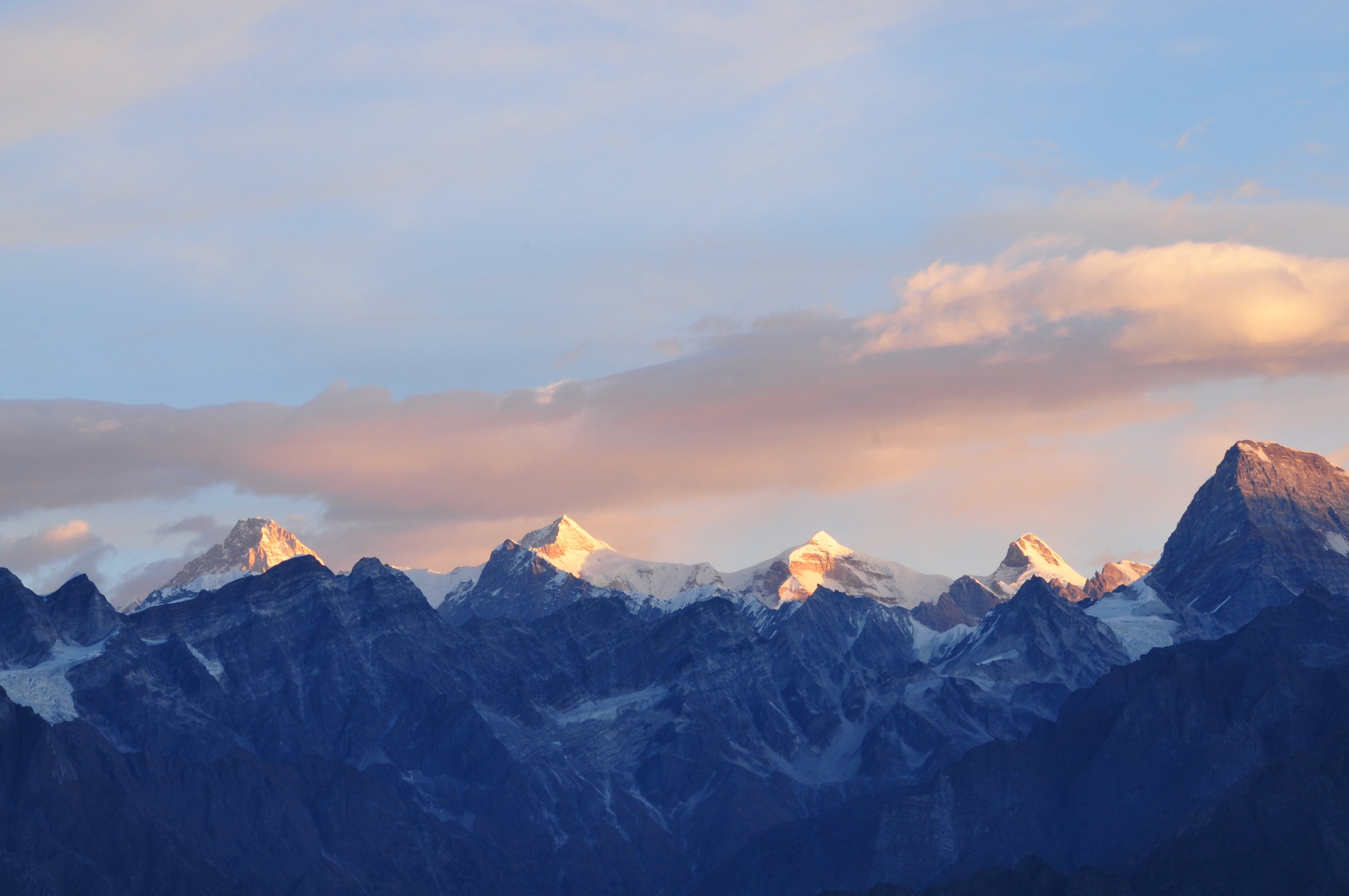
Kamet (left), Mandir Parbat (second from left), Mana, Deoban, Nilgiri from Khullara Campsite

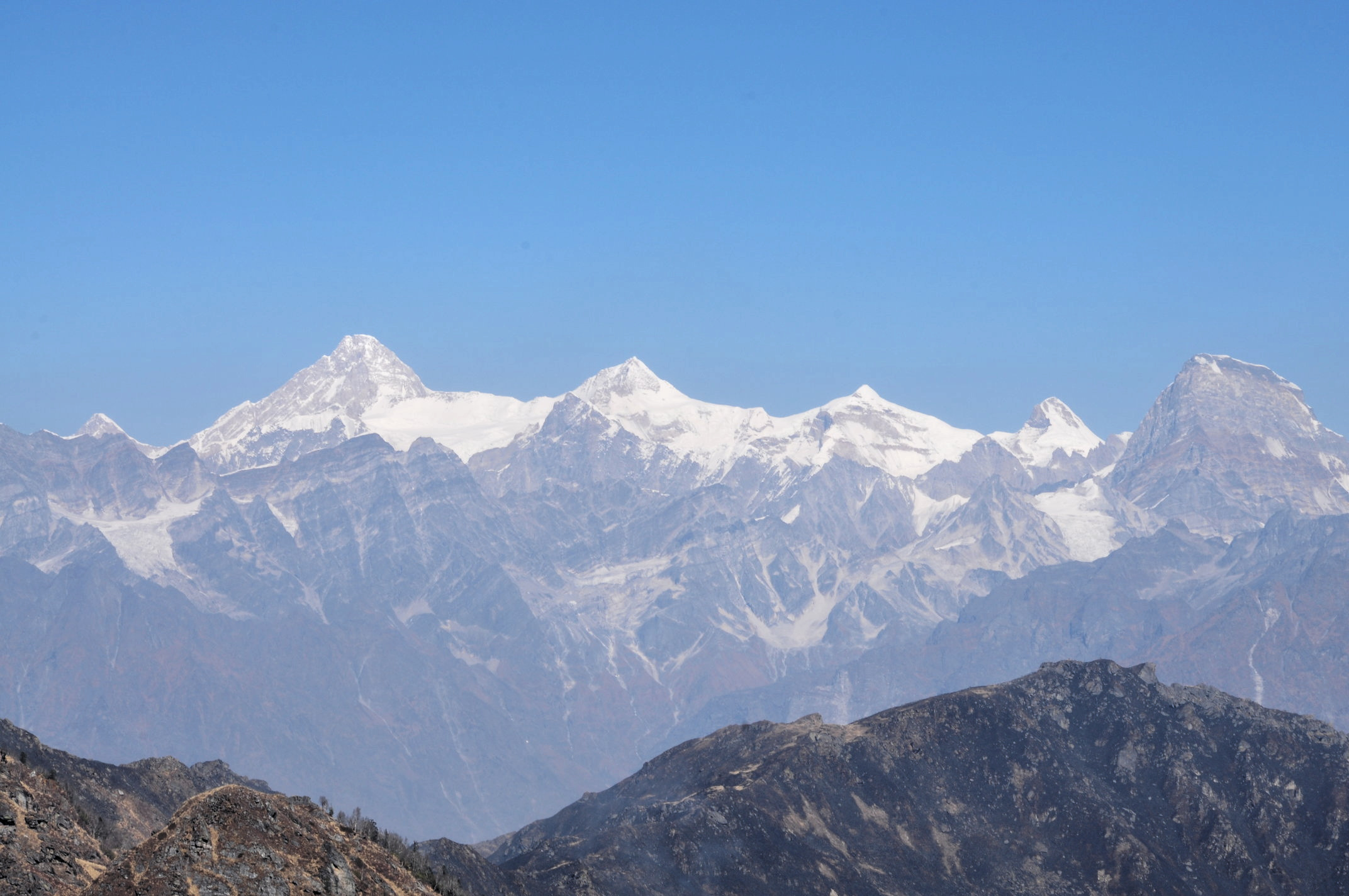
Kamet (left), Mandir Parbat (second from left), Mana, Deoban, Nilgiri from Kuari Top

Kamet is surrounded by three principal neighboring or subsidiary peaks:

- Mukut Parbat, 7,242 m (23,760 ft) Ranked 97th, prominence = 840 m, 30°57′08″N 79°34′13″E, northwest of Kamet. First ascent 1951 (see below). The lower of Mukut Parbat's twin summit has an elevation of 7,130 m (23,392 ft).
- Abi Gamin, 7,355 m (24,130 ft), prominence = 217 m 30°55′57″N 79°36′09″E, north-northeast of Kamet; connected to Kamet by Meade's Col. First ascent 1950.
- Mana Peak, 7,272 m (23,858 ft) Ranked 92nd, prominence = 720 m, 30°52′52″N 79°36′57″E, south-southeast of Kamet. First ascent 1937.

Several adjoining peaks, such as Mana NW, 7,092 m, Point 6,977 m, Deoban, 6,855 m, and Bidhan Parbat, 6,519 m, also lie close to Kamet.

== Nomenclature ==
There are varying explanations of the name "Kamet." Charles Meade gives the pronunciation as /ˈkʌmeɪt/, and claims that it is known to Tibetans as Kangmen, signifying "huge grandmother of a sacred snow chain". However, Frank Smythe writes in his book Kamet Conquered that the genesis of the name is from the Tibetan word Kangmed ("the lower snows", from kang, "snow", and med, "little"), as distinct from the "higher snows" of the Kailash range, 110 miles east of Kamet. This range is slightly lower than Kamet, its highest peak being Gurla Mandhata, 7,728 m/25,355 ft; however it stands more fully on the high Tibetan Plateau. At dawn and dusk, "the copper colored rock of Mount Kamet reflecting the oblique rays of the sun on its hanging glaciers appears to set these glaciers aglow with crackling flames and bathes the mountain in a red burning glow". Hence the term "glacier fire" is also used as an allusion to the name Kamet.

== Partial timeline ==
- 1848: Richard Strachey determines the height and location of Kamet, as well as the neighboring peaks Abi Gamin, Mukut Parbat, and Mana.
- 1855: German explorers and scientists Adolphe and Robert Schlagintweit, invited by the East India Company to make surveys, travel into Tibet in disguise. After being discovered and arrested, they return, and attempt Abi Gamin from Tibet (via the Abi Gamin Glacier), believing it to be Kamet. (This mistake hampers expeditions until 1912.) They claim to reach a height of 6,785 m (22,260 ft), which is extraordinary for this date.
- 1877: I. S. Pocock of the Survey of India, under E. C. Ryall, accurately surveys Kamet's position. However, he supports the inaccurate belief that Abi Gamin is a minor subpeak of Kamet and that a northern route to the summit is practical.
- 1907: Tom Longstaff, Charles Bruce and A. L. Mumm, with alpine guides Alexis and Henri Brocherel, make a preliminary reconnaissance of the eastern and western sides of Kamet. The highest point reached is 6,100 m (20,000 ft) above the East Kamet Glacier. Longstaff deems the East Kamet route as too dangerous due to avalanche risk.
- 1910–1911: Charles Meade, with Alpine guides Alexis Brocherel and Pierre Blanc, and a separate expedition under Alexander Kellas, make a preliminary reconnaissance of the western side of the peak; they explore Khaiam Pass and Glacier.
- 1911: Capt. A. M. Slingsby attempts Kamet on the western side from Ghastoli Glacier (or West Kamet Glacier) via the col on the ridge between Abi Gamin and Mukut Parbat (subsequently named as Slingsby's Col, 6,400 m/21,000 ft).
- 1912: Meade, with Alpine guides Franz Lochmatter of St. Niklaus in the canton Valais, Pierre Blanc, Justin Blanc and Jean Perrin, attempts Kamet by Slingsby's route, and also later explores the Raikhana glacier system to the east of Kamet. Meade concludes that the East Kamet Glacier is the only practicable route to Kamet's summit.
- 1913: Slingsby attempts the same route as in 1911 and reaches 7,000 m (23,000 ft). He later dies in battle in Mesopotamia in 1916.
- 1913: Meade, with Alpine guide Pierre Blanc, attempts Kamet from the eastern side and reaches Meade's Col, 7,138 m. (23,420 ft).
- 1914: Kellas makes another reconnaissance of which no records are available, and which is probably abandoned midway due to the commencement of World War I.
- 1920: Kellas and Henry Morshead attempt Meade's 1913 route and reach a point slightly above Meade's Col.
- 1931: The first ascent of Kamet, detailed above.
- 1937: Frank Smythe returns to the Bhyundar Valley and makes the solo first ascent of Mana on 12 August, through its south ridge from the plateau at the head of the Uttari Naktoni glacier. His companion P.R. Oliver stopped exhausted at 23000'.
- 1950: An Anglo-Swiss expedition ascends Abi Gamin from its North East ridge.
- 1951: Mukut Parbat is climbed via the steep northwest ridge by a New Zealand team that included Earle Riddiford (leader), Edmund Hillary, George Lowe, Edmund Cotter and Pasang Dawa Lama. Summiteers were Riddiford, Cotter and Pasang Dawa Lama.
- 1955: An Indian expedition from the Himalayan Mountaineering Institute in Darjeeling makes the second ascent of Kamet on 6 July. Nandu Jayal led the party; Jayal, Ang Tharkay, Da Namgyal, Ang Temba, and Hlakpa Dorje comprised the summit team. Their route followed the ridge linking Abi Gamin and Kamet.
- 1966: Mana is climbed on 19 September by a new route, the NW ridge from Purbi Kamet glacier which had rebuffed Smythe in 1937, by Pranesh Chakraborty, Pasang Phutar, Tshering Lhakpa, Pasang Tshering from Camp 5(c.22500').
- 1995: Mana Northwest is scaled by members of a joint Indo-Tibetan Border Police–Japanese expedition after a tough technical wall climb.
- 2000: To mark the turn of century, Ruptaps Mountaineering Club from Asansol, West Bengal climbed Kamet on 3 October 2000. The summiteers were Leader Gautam Mukherjee and Jasjeet Singh.
- 2006: A commemorative 75th anniversary expedition by the Kolkata Section of the Himalayan Club puts ten climbers on the summit of Kamet. (First ascensionist Frank Smythe was a Himalayan Club member).
- 2008: The southeast face (6,000 ft) was climbed for the first time by two Japanese climbers, Kazuya Hiraide and Kei Taniguchi.
- 2010: An avalanche kills Lt Col C. Poornachandra and Maj Manish Gusain. They were a part of a 41-member Indian army team led by Col Ajay Kothiyal. None of the 41-members summited the peak due to lack of technical skills.
- 2010: A 6-member team led by Herbert Wolf followed the traditional route to the summit via the Purbi Kamet glacier and the Meade's col. Four high camps were established and the attempt took place from the summit camp at an altitude of 7080 m. On 28 September 2010, the leader with Oliver Amann, Nicolas Touboul, Bernd Mayer and Roland Brand reached the summit. Erich Eisele could not go above 5620 m for health reasons.
- 2012: Southwest face (2,000m) was climbed for the first time by French climbers, Sébastien Bohin, Didier Jourdan, Sébastien Moatti, and Sébastien Ratel, following a route that they called Spicy Game, and for which they won a 2013 Piolet d'Or. 2012: the team of Bengol, Bharat (Abdul Kalam Educational Society) Celebrated the 150th birthday of Swami Vivekananda. Summit by three sherpa (Lakpa Sherpa, Migma Sherpa and Dukkpa Sherpa) and three members (Md.Gazali Khan, Santu Biswash and Nandan Prasad Jaiswal " Nandu").
- 2014: An expedition to Mount Kamet in the Garhwal Himalayas faced a series of unforeseen challenges that ultimately led to its failure. The team from Kolkata led by Jyotsna seth from Nakelndaga Trekkers Association, comprising experienced mountaineers, had planned a carefully structured ascent. However, two critical factors—severe weather conditions and a shortage of rations—forced them to abandon the climb before reaching the summit. The expedition was hit by prolonged bad weather, including heavy snowfall and strong winds. Whiteout conditions made navigation difficult, and extreme cold slowed down the team's progress. The unexpected storms also delayed their movement between camps, increasing their dependence on available supplies. Due to extended delays caused by the weather, the team's food supplies started running dangerously low. The mountaineers had planned their rationing based on an estimated timeline, but prolonged bad weather meant they had to stay longer in higher camps without the ability to resupply. This led to exhaustion, dehydration, and reduced energy levels among the climbers. Safe return but unfinished goal.
- 2015: In August, a team of eight seasoned climbers from the Kolkata set out on an ambitious journey—to conquer Mt. Kamet (7,756 m), India's highest climbable peak. Led by Piyush Sinha, an experienced mountaineer with multiple Himalayan expeditions under his belt, At 8:45 AM on September 11, 2015, Tasi Sherpa, Stanbu Sherpa and Somenath Mondal stood on the summit of Mt. Kamet, marking the first successful Kolkata-based ascent of the peak. They hoisted the Indian flag and took photographs, and spent 15 minutes on the summit. [14]

== Glaciers and rivers ==
The West (Pachmi or Paschimi) Kamet Glacier, the East (Purbi or Purva) Kamet Glacier and the Raikana Glacier systems surround Kamet. The branches of the West Kamet Glacier head on the western slopes of Kamet, Abi Gamin, and Mukut Parbat. The East Kamet Glacier flows from the eastern side of Kamet and Mana. The Raikhana glacier originates on the east side of Meade's Col saddle, flows east of Abi Gamin, and unites with the East Kamet Glacier. The West Kamet Glacier drains into the Saraswati River while the East Kamet Glacier feeds the Dhauliganga River; both rivers are tributaries of the Alaknanda River, the major river of the Chamoli district.

== High altitude research ==
Alexander Kellas and his companion Henry Morshead conducted scientific studies during their 1920 Kamet expedition focusing on the physiology of high altitude travel and acclimatization, and on the possibility of using supplemental oxygen. These studies eventually proved useful on expeditions to Mount Everest.

== See also ==
- List of ultras of the Himalayas
