= Garhwal Himalayas =

Mountain ranges in India

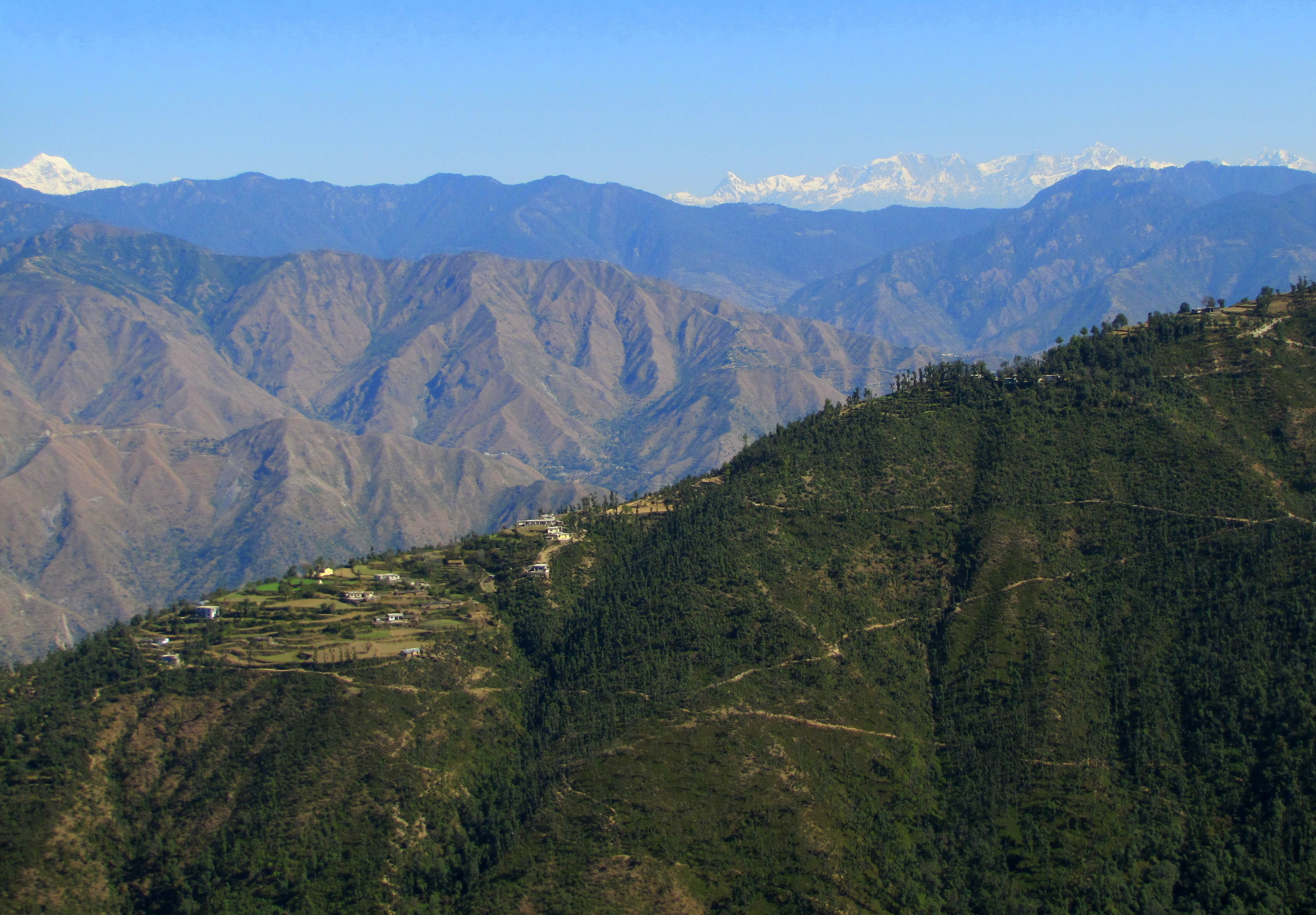
- Garhwal Himalaya from "Camel's Back", Uttarakhand

Highest point
- Peak: Nanda Devi
- Elevation: 7,817 m (25,646 ft)
- Coordinates: 30°22′23″N 79°58′15″E

Geography
- Location within India
- Country: India
- State: Uttarakhand
- Range coordinates: 30°37′01″N 78°54′04″E
- Parent range: Himalayas

The Garhwal Himalayas or Garhwal Himalaya are mountain ranges situated in the Indian state of Uttarakhand.

== Geology ==
This range is also a part of the Himalayan Sivalik Hills, the outer most hills of the Himalaya located in Himachal Pradesh and Uttarakhand.

== Major peaks ==
Rank	Mountain / Peak	Elevation		Prominence		FA	Coordinates
Rank	Mountain / Peak	m	ft	m	ft	FA	Coordinates
1	Nanda Devi	7,817	25,646	3,139	10,299	1936	30°22′26″N 79°58′15″E
2	Kamet	7,756	25,446	2,825	9,268	1931	30°55′12″N 79°35′36″E
3	Sunanda Devi	7,434	24,390	260	850	1939	30°22′0″N 79°59′40″E
4	Abi Gamin	7,355	24,131	217	712	1950	30°55′48″N 79°36′0″E
5	Mana Peak	7,274	23,865	732	2,402	1937	30°52′51″N 79°36′57″E
6	Mukut Parbat	7,242	23,760	683	2,241	1951	30°57′8″N 79°34′13″E
7	Trisul	7,120	23,360	1,616	5,302	1907	30°18′46″N 79°46′38″E

== Demographics ==
The towns which are included in these ranges are Pauri, Tehri, Uttarkashi, Rudraprayag, Chamoli, and Chota Char Dham pilgrimage namely Gangotri, Yamunotri, Badrinath and Kedarnath. Some of the sites of the location are the hill stations of Mussoorie, Dhanaulti, Auli, Chopta. The UNESCO World Heritage Site, Nanda Devi and Valley of Flowers National Parks, is also located in Garhwal Himalaya.

== See also ==
- Garhwal division
- List of mountain peaks of Uttarakhand
