= List of tehsils of Uttarakhand =

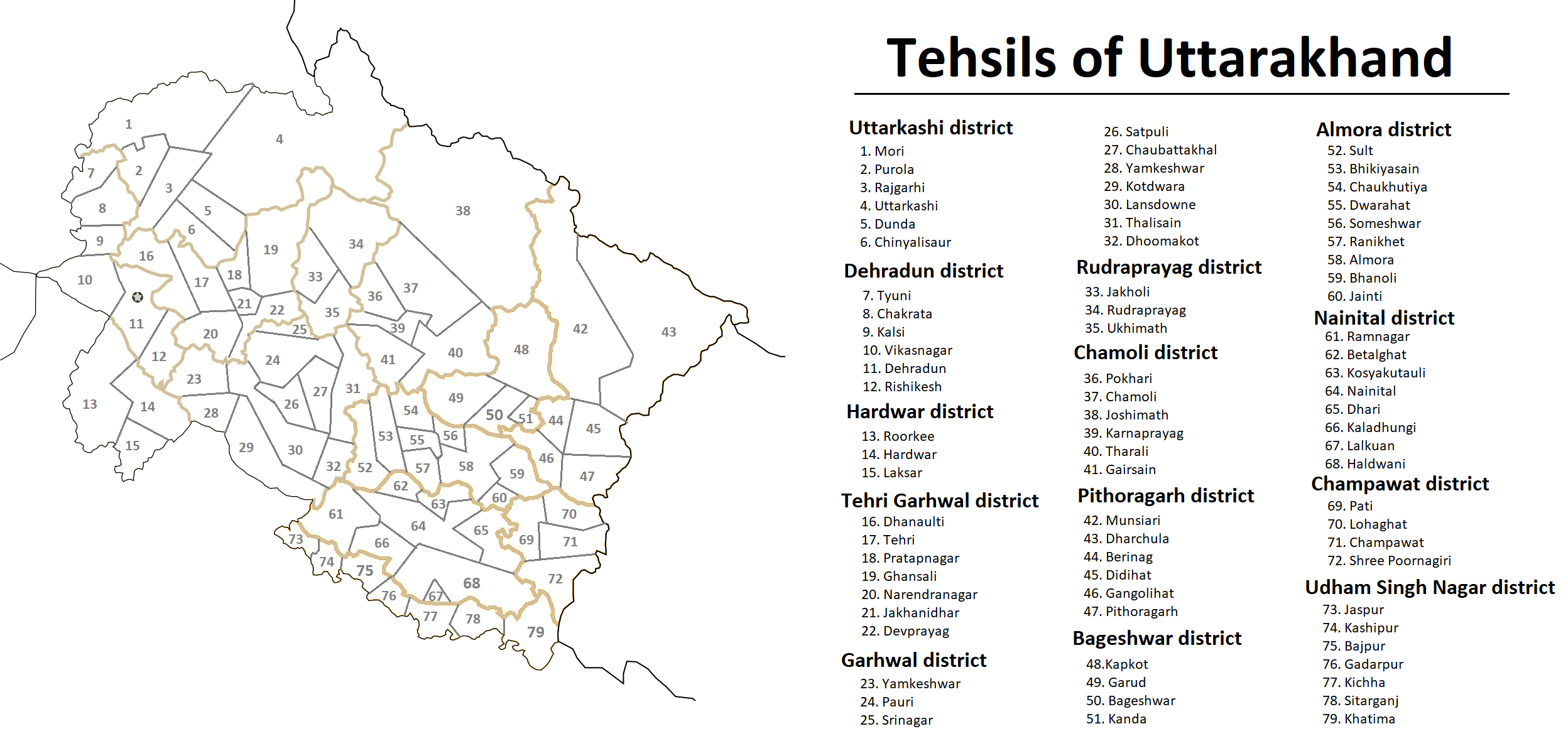
Tehsils of Uttarakhand (Schematic).png

The article lists all the 117 tehsils in the 13 districts of Uttarakhand.

Divisions	Districts	Tehsils
Garhwal	Chamoli	Adi Badri; Chamoli; Gairsain; Ghat; Jilasu; Joshimath; Karnaprayag; Nandaprayag; Narayanbagar; Pokhari; Tharali
Garhwal	Dehradun	Chakrata; Dehradun; Doiwala; Kalsi; Rishikesh; Tyuni; Vikasnagar
Garhwal	Haridwar	Bhagwanpur; Haridwar; Laksar; Roorkee
Garhwal	Pauri Garhwal	Bironkhal; Chakisain; Chaubattakhal; Dhumakot; Jakhanikhal; Kotdwar; Lansdowne; Pauri; Rikhanikhal; Satpuli; Srinagar; Thalisain; Yamkeshwar
Garhwal	Rudraprayag	Basukedar; Jakholi; Rudraprayag; Ukhimath
Garhwal	Tehri Garhwal	Balganga; Devprayag; Dhanaulti; Gaja; Ghansali; Jakhanidhar; Kandisaur; Kirtinagar; Madannegi; Nainbagh; Narendranagar; Paoki Devi; Pratapnagar; Tehri
Garhwal	Uttarkashi	Barkot; Bhatwari; Chinyalisaur; Dhauntari; Dunda; Joshiyara; Mori; Purola
Kumaon	Almora	Almora; Bagwali Pokhar; Bhanoli; Bhikiyasain; Chaukhutia; Dwarahat; Jainti; Jalali; Lamgara; Machhor; Ranikhet; Salt; Someshwar; Syalde
Kumaon	Bageshwar	Bageshwar; Dug Nakuri; Garur; Kanda; Kaphaligair; Kapkot; Shama
Kumaon	Champawat	Barakot; Champawat; Lohaghat; Pati; Purnagiri
Kumaon	Nainital	Betalghat; Dhari; Haldwani; Kainchi Dham; Kaladhungi; Khansyun; Lalkuan; Nainital; Ramnagar
Kumaon	Pithoragarh	Bangapani; Berinag; Devalthal; Dharchula; Didihat; Ganai; Gangolihat; Kanalichhina; Munsiari; Pithoragarh; Tejam; Thal
Kumaon	Udham Singh Nagar	Bajpur; Gadarpur; Jaspur; Kashipur; Khatima; Kichha; Nanakmatta; Rudrapur; Sitarganj

== District-wise details ==
No.	Districts	Tehsils
1	Almora	14
2	Bageshwar	7
3	Chamoli	11
4	Champawat	5
5	Dehradun	7
6	Haridwar	4
7	Nainital	9
8	Pauri Garhwal	13
9	Pithoragarh	12
10	Rudraprayag	4
11	Tehri Garhwal	14
12	Udham Singh Nagar	9
13	Uttarkashi	8
Total		117

== See also ==
- Administrative divisions of Uttarakhand
- List of districts of Uttarakhand
- List of parganas of Uttarakhand
- List of community development blocks of Uttarakhand
- List of subdistricts in India
