= Outline of Uttarakhand =

Overview of and topical guide to Uttarakhand

Location of Uttarakhand

The following outline is provided as an overview of and topical guide to Uttarakhand:

Uttarakhand – state in the northern part of India. It is often referred to as the Devabhumi (literally: "Land of the Gods") due to many Hindu temples and pilgrimage centres found throughout the state. Uttarakhand is known for its natural environment of the Himalayas, the Bhabar and Terai.

== General reference ==
=== Names ===
- Common English name(s): Uttarakhand
  - Pronunciation: /ˌʊtəˈrɑːkʌnd/
- Official English name(s): Uttarakhand
- Nickname(s): Devabhumi ("Land of the Gods")
- Adjectival(s): Uttarakhandi
- Demonym(s): Uttarakhandi

=== Rankings (amongst States and Union Territories of India) ===
- by area: 19th
- by elevation: 2nd
- by population (2011): 21st
- by population density (2011): 27th
- by gross domestic product (GDP nominal) (2017–18): 19th
- by gross domestic product (GDP nominal) per capita: 9th
- by Human Development Index (HDI) (2017): 19th
- by life expectancy at birth (2010–2014): 3rd
- by sex ratio: 14th
- by literacy rate (2011): 17th

== Geography of Uttarakhand ==
- Geography of Uttarakhand
  - Uttarakhand is: a State of India
  - Population of Uttarakhand: 10,116,752
  - Area of Uttarakhand: 53,483 km^{2}
  - Atlas of Uttarakhand

=== Environment of Uttarakhand ===
- Uttarakhand Forest Department

==== Ecoregions of Uttarakhand ====
- Western Himalayan alpine shrub and meadows
- Western Himalayan subalpine conifer forests
- Himalayan subtropical pine forests
- Western Himalayan broadleaf forests
- Himalayan subtropical broadleaf forests
- Terai-Duar savanna and grasslands
- Upper Gangetic Plains moist deciduous forests

==== Natural geographic features of Uttarakhand ====
- Great Himalayas
- Garhwal Himalayas
- Sivalik Hills
- Bhabar
- Terai
- Doab
- Indo-Gangetic Plain
- Ganges Basin
- Mountains peaks of Uttarakhand
- Lakes of Kumaon hills

=== Location of Uttarakhand ===
- Uttarakhand is situated within the following regions:
  - Northern Hemisphere
  - Eastern Hemisphere
    - Eurasia
      - Asia
        - South Asia
          - Indian subcontinent
            - India
              - North India
- Time zone: Indian Standard Time (UTC+05:30)

=== Regions of Uttarakhand ===
==== Administrative divisions of Uttarakhand ====
- Administrative divisions of Uttarakhand
  - Districts of Uttarakhand
    - Tehsils of Uttarakhand
    - Community development blocks of Uttarakhand
      - Urban local bodies of Uttarakhand

===== Districts of Uttarakhand, by division =====
- Kumaon division
  - Almora district
  - Bageshwar district
  - Champawat district
  - Nainital district
  - Pithoragarh district
  - Udham Singh Nagar district
- Garhwal division
  - Chamoli district
  - Dehradun district
  - Haridwar district
  - Pauri Garhwal district
  - Rudraprayag district
  - Tehri Garhwal district
  - Uttarkashi district

===== Districts of Uttarakhand, by division =====
- Kumaon division
  - Almora district
  - Bageshwar district
  - Champawat district
  - Nainital district
  - Pithoragarh district
  - Udham Singh Nagar district
- Garhwal division
  - Chamoli district
  - Dehradun district
  - Haridwar district
  - Pauri Garhwal district
  - Rudraprayag district
  - Tehri Garhwal district
  - Uttarkashi district

===== Districts of Uttarakhand, by division =====
- Kumaon division
  - Almora district
  - Bageshwar district
  - Champawat district
  - Nainital district
  - Pithoragarh district
  - Udham Singh Nagar district
- Garhwal division
  - Chamoli district
  - Dehradun district
  - Haridwar district
  - Pauri Garhwal district
  - Rudraprayag district
  - Tehri Garhwal district
  - Uttarkashi district

===== Municipalities of Uttarakhand =====
- Municipal Corporations of Uttarakhand
  - Dehradun
  - Haridwar
  - Haldwani
  - Roorkee
  - Rudrapur
  - Kashipur
  - Rishikesh
  - Kotdwar

== Demographics of Uttarakhand ==
- List of cities in Uttarakhand by population

=== People of Uttarakhand ===
- People from Uttarakhand
- Indo-Aryan people
  - Pahari people
    - Garhwali people
    - Kumaoni people
    - Jaunsari people
    - Khas people
  - Buksa people
  - Tharu people
- Tibeto-Burman people
  - Bhotiya people
  - Raji people
  - Jad people
  - Banrawat people

=== Languages of Uttarakhand ===
- Indo-Aryan languages
  - Northern Indo-Aryan languages
    - Garhwali language
    - Kumaoni language
    - Jaunsari language
  - Eastern Indo-Aryan languages
    - Tharu languages
- Tibeto-Burman languages
  - West Himalayish languages
    - Rongpo language
    - Byangsi language
    - Chaudangsi language
    - Darmiya language
  - Greater Magaric languages
    - Raji language
    - Rawat language
  - Bodish languages
    - Jad language

== Government and politics of Uttarakhand ==
- Form of government: state government (parliamentary system of representative democracy)
- Capitals of Uttarakhand:
  - Gairsain (Summer)
  - Dehradun (Winter)
- Elections in Uttarakhand
  - Uttarakhand State Election Commission
  - Local body elections in Uttarakhand

=== Branches of the government of Uttarakhand ===
- Government of Uttarakhand

==== Executive branch of the government of Uttarakhand ====
- Head of state: Governor of Uttarakhand
- Head of government: Chief Minister of Uttarakhand
  - Cabinet: Uttarakhand Council of Ministers
  - Chief Secretary of Uttarakhand

==== Legislative branch of the government of Uttarakhand ====
- Uttarakhand Legislative Assembly
  - Speaker of the Uttarakhand Legislative Assembly
  - Leader of the Opposition in the Uttarakhand Legislative Assembly
  - Constituencies of the Uttarakhand Legislative Assembly

==== Judicial branch of the government of Uttarakhand ====
- Uttarakhand High Court
  - Chief Justice of the Uttarakhand High Court
  - Judges of the High Court
  - Seat: Nainital

=== Law and order in Uttarakhand ===
- Uttarakhand Police

=== Government agencies in Uttarakhand ===
- Uttarakhand Public Service Commission
- Uttarakhand Human Rights Commission

== History of Uttarakhand ==
- History of Uttarakhand

=== History of Uttarakhand, by period ===
==== Ancient Uttarakhand ====
- Uttarakuru Kingdom
- Paurava Kingdom
- Khasa Kingdom
- Kirata Kingdom
- Nanda Empire
- Maurya Empire
- Kushan Empire
- Kuninda Kingdom
- Gupta Empire

==== Medieval Uttarakhand ====
- Karkota Empire
- Garhwal Kingdom
- Kumaon Kingdom
  - Katyuri dynasty
  - Chand dynasty
- Raika Kingdom
- Malla Kingdom
- Gorkha Kingdom
  - Shah dynasty
- Anglo-Nepalese War
- Treaty of Sugauli

==== Colonial Uttarakhand ====
- Company rule
  - Ceded and Conquered Provinces
  - North Western Provinces
  - Agra Presidency
- British rule
  - United Provinces of Agra and Oudh
  - United Provinces of British India
  - United Provinces
- Coolie-Begar movement

==== Contemporary Uttarakhand ====
- Uttarakhand movement
- Chipko movement
- Rampur Tiraha firing case
- Uttar Pradesh Reorganisation Act, 2000 – law that led to the formation of the State of Uttarakhand.

=== History of Uttarakhand, by region ===
- History of Dehradun

== Culture of Uttarakhand ==
- Monuments in Uttarakhand
  - Monuments of National Importance in Uttarakhand
  - State Protected Monuments in Uttarakhand
- World Heritage Sites in Uttarakhand
  - Nanda Devi and Valley of Flowers National Parks

=== Art in Uttarakhand ===
- Music of Uttarakhand
- Cuisine of Uttarakhand

=== Sports in Uttarakhand ===
- Cricket in Uttarakhand
  - Uttarakhand cricket team
- Football in Uttarakhand
  - Uttarakhand football team
  - Uttarakhand Super League

=== Symbols of Uttarakhand ===
- Symbols of Uttarakhand
  - state emblem: Diamond Shield
  - state song: Uttarakhand Devabhumi Matribhumi
  - state animal: Alpine Musk Deer
  - state bird: Himalayan Monal
  - state flower: Brahma Kamal
  - state tree: Burans

== Economy and infrastructure of Uttarakhand ==
- Economy of Uttarakhand
  - Tourism in Uttarakhand
    - Chota Char Dham
  - State Industrial Development Corporation of Uttarakhand

=== Infrastructure of Uttarakhand ===
- Uttarakhand Transport Corporation
- Char Dham Highway
- Char Dham Railway
- Urban Development Directorate

== Education in Uttarakhand ==
- Education in Uttarakhand
  - Institutions of higher education in Uttarakhand
  - Uttarakhand Board of School Education

== See also ==
- Outline of India
