= List of parganas of Uttarakhand =

The article lists all the 86 parganas in the 13 districts of Uttarakhand.

Divisions	Districts	Parganas
Garhwal	Chamoli	Badhan; Chamoli; Chandpur; Gairsain; Ghat; Joshimath; Karnaprayag; Pokhari
Garhwal	Dehradun	Jaunsar Bawar; Pachhwadun; Parwadun
Garhwal	Haridwar	Bhagwanpur; Churiyala Mohanpur; Gordhanpur; Jwalapur; Manglaur; Najibabad; Roorkee; Sikrorha
Garhwal	Pauri Garhwal	Barahsyun; Bhabar; Chandkot; Devalgarh; Ganga Salan; Malla Salan; Talla Salan
Garhwal	Rudraprayag	Basukedar; Jakholi; Ukhimath; Viro
Garhwal	Tehri Garhwal	Chaka; Chamba; Chamiyala; Chandrabadani; Dangi; Devprayag; Dhanaulti; Ghansali; Jakhanidhar; Lambgaon; Nainbagh; Narendranagar; Pratapnagar; Udaipur
Garhwal	Uttarkashi	Barkot; Bhatwari; Chinyalisaur; Dunda; Mori; Purola
Kumaon	Almora	Baramandal; Bhikiyasain; Dwarahat; Jainti; Pali; Salt; Someshwar
Kumaon	Bageshwar	Danpur
Kumaon	Champawat	Kali Kumaon
Kumaon	Nainital	Bhawar Chaumaisi; Bhawar Chhah Khata; Bhawar Chilkiya; Bhawarkota; Chhah Khata; Dhaniyakot; Dhyani Raun; Kutoli; Paharkota; Ramgarh
Kumaon	Pithoragarh	Askot; Berinag; Darma; Ganai Gangoli; Gangoli; Johar; Sira; Sor; Tejam
Kumaon	Udham Singh Nagar	Bajpur; Bilhairi; Gadarpur; Jaspur; Kashipur; Khatima; Rudrapur; Sitarganj

== District-wise details ==
No.	Districts	Parganas
1	Almora	7
2	Bageshwar	1
3	Chamoli	8
4	Champawat	1
5	Dehradun	3
6	Haridwar	8
7	Nainital	10
8	Pauri Garhwal	7
9	Pithoragarh	9
10	Rudraprayag	4
11	Tehri Garhwal	14
12	Udham Singh Nagar	8
13	Uttarkashi	6
Total		86

== See also ==
- Administrative divisions of Uttarakhand
- List of districts of Uttarakhand
- List of tehsils of Uttarakhand
- List of community development blocks of Uttarakhand
