= List of community development blocks of Uttarakhand =

The article lists all the 95 community development blocks in the 13 districts of Uttarakhand.

Divisions	Districts	Community Development Blocks
Garhwal	Chamoli	Dasholi; Deval; Gairsain; Ghat; Joshimath; Karnaprayag; Narayanbagar; Pokhari; Tharali
Garhwal	Dehradun	Chakrata; Doiwala; Kalsi; Raipur; Sahaspur; Vikasnagar
Garhwal	Haridwar	Bahadrabad; Bhagwanpur; Khanpur; Laksar; Narsan; Roorkee
Garhwal	Pauri Garhwal	Bironkhal; Dugadda; Dwarikhal; Ekeshwar; Jaiharikhal; Kaljikhal; Khirsu; Kot; Nainidanda; Pabo; Pauri; Pokhara; Rikhanikhal; Thalisain; Yamkeshwar
Garhwal	Rudraprayag	Agastmuni; Jakholi; Ukhimath
Garhwal	Tehri Garhwal	Bhilangna; Chamba; Devprayag; Jakhanidhar; Jaunpur; Kirtinagar; Narendranagar; Pratapnagar; Thauldhar
Garhwal	Uttarkashi	Bhatwari; Chinyalisaur; Dunda; Mori; Naugaon; Purola
Kumaon	Almora	Bhainsiyachhana; Bhikiyasain; Chaukhutia; Dhaula Devi; Dwarahat; Hawalbagh; Lamgara; Salt; Syalde; Takula; Tarikhet
Kumaon	Bageshwar	Bageshwar; Garur; Kapkot
Kumaon	Champawat	Barakot; Champawat; Lohaghat; Pati
Kumaon	Nainital	Betalghat; Bhimtal; Dhari; Haldwani; Kotabagh; Okhalkanda; Ramgarh; Ramnagar
Kumaon	Pithoragarh	Berinag; Dharchula; Didihat; Gangolihat; Kanalichhina; Munakot; Munsiari; Pithoragarh
Kumaon	Udham Singh Nagar	Bajpur; Gadarpur; Jaspur; Kashipur; Khatima; Rudrapur; Sitarganj

== District-wise details ==
No.	Districts	Community Development Blocks
1	Almora	11
2	Bageshwar	3
3	Chamoli	9
4	Champawat	4
5	Dehradun	6
6	Haridwar	6
7	Nainital	8
8	Pauri Garhwal	15
9	Pithoragarh	8
10	Rudraprayag	3
11	Tehri Garhwal	9
12	Udham Singh Nagar	7
13	Uttarkashi	6
Total		95

== See also ==
- Administrative divisions of Uttarakhand
- List of districts of Uttarakhand
- List of parganas of Uttarakhand
- List of tehsils of Uttarakhand
- Block (district subdivision)
