= Acalolepta holosericea =

Scientific classification
- Domain: Eukaryota
- Kingdom: Animalia
- Phylum: Arthropoda
- Class: Insecta
- Order: Coleoptera
- Suborder: Polyphaga
- Infraorder: Cucujiformia
- Family: Cerambycidae
- Tribe: Lamiini
- Genus: Acalolepta
- Species: A. holosericea

Binomial name
- Acalolepta holosericea (Breuning, 1939)

Synonyms
- Dihammus holosericeus Breuning, 1939

Species of beetle

Acalolepta holosericea is a species of beetle in the family Cerambycidae. It was described by Stephan von Breuning in 1939. It is known from India.

It's 20 mm long and 6 mm wide, and its type locality is Bajwar, Almora Province.
