= Kuthaliya Bora =

Hindu caste

The Kuthaliya Bora are a Hindu caste found in the state of Uttarakhand in India. They are also known as Bora Karki.

== Social organization ==
The Kuthaliya Bora are found mainly in the Kumaon Himalayas, mainly in the districts of Almora and Pithoragarh. In Almora District, they are found in the villages of Kamsyar, Talara, Chowgaon, and Mana. Their name is derived from the Hindi word kuthla, which means a hemp bag, and is used to store grains, and bora meaning a trader. They are said to have immigrated from western Nepal in the 19th century. The Kuthaliya Bora now speak Kumaoni language.

== Present circumstances ==
The Kuthaliya Bora are a strictly endogamous community, and practice clan exogamy. Their clans are known as jatis, some of their major jatis include the Chakar, Gartiriya, Kharghatiya, Khariyal, Kushmania, Bujeri, Ghangri and Purkiya. The jati names are either derived from their villages of origin or their ancestral occupation.

The traditional occupation of the Kuthaliya Bora was the manufacture kuthla, which was essential object for the Kumoani farmer. Most Bora are now petty shopkeepers and traders. An important subsidiary occupation is the raising of cattle.

== Other communities with the 'Bora' surname ==
In the Kumaon region, the surname "Bora" is also used by Rajput clans. These Kumaoni Rajputs, sometimes referred to as Bora Rajputs, are distinct from the Kuthaliya Bora community in caste, history, and traditional occupation. They belong to the Kshatriya varna and have historically held landowning and administrative positions.

== See also ==
- Bania
