= Gaula Range =

Gaula Range may refer to the following places in India:

- Gaula Range, Haldwani, village in Haldwani Tehsil, Uttarakhand
- Gaula Range, Lalkuan, village in Lalkuan Tehsil, Uttarakhand
