= Thal, Uttarakhand =

Town in Uttarakhand, India

Thal
- town
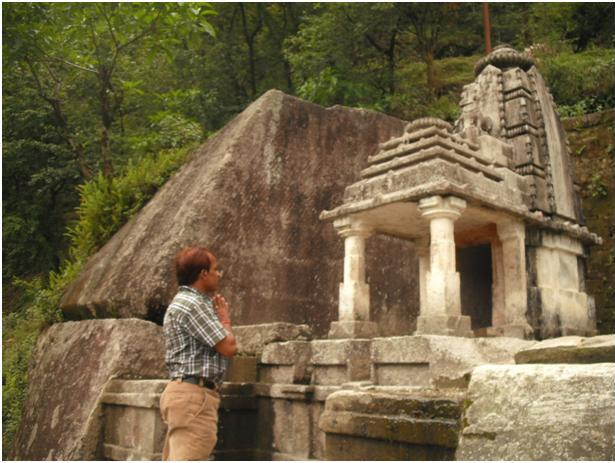
- Ek Hathiya Dewal Temple at Thal

- Location in Uttarakhand, India Thal (India)
- Coordinates: 29.8265°N 80.1408°E
- Country: India
- State: Uttarakhand
- District: Pithoragarh

Population
  - Total: 5,000 (estimated)

Languages
  - Official: Hindi
- Time zone: UTC+5:30 (IST)
- Postal code: 262552
- Vehicle registration: UK 05

Thal is a small town situated on the banks of Ramganga river in the Pithoragarh district in the Indian state of Uttarakhand. It is one of the thirteen tehsils of district Pithoragarh.

Thal has been a centre for local trade for nearby settlements at Didihat, Munsiari, Chaukori and Dharamghar since antiquity. It is also known for a 9th century Shiva temple located on the bank of Ramganga river and the Ek Hathiya Dewal temple - a rock cut temple believed to be crafted by a one-armed artisan.

Thal was a block of the Almora district from 1957 to 1962. Since 30 September 2014, it is a tehsil of the Pithoragarh district, which was constituted from 114 villages earlier part of Berinag and Didihat tehsil.

== History ==
Thal is among the oldest towns in Pithoragarh district. It has been a centre for local trade for nearby settlements at Didihat, Munsiari, Chaukori and Dharamghar since antiquity. There is a 9th century Shiva temple located on the bank of the Ramganga river, which was built under the patronage of the Katyuri kings. Baleshwar form of Lord Shiva is worshiped in this temple. At the time of Bikhaut Sankranti, an 8-day fair used to be held here, which amassed a gathering of around 15,000 people in 1911.

Thal was connected by a motor road with Almora in 1955 and in 1957, the then UP government opened a Community development block office in Thal. There were 600 villages under this development block. The development block continued functioning till 1962, after which the government closed this development block office and divided the villages falling in Thal development block into Didihat and Berinag development blocks. In 1962, a 68 meter long bridge was built over the Ramganga river at Thal. A primary health center was opened here on 11 October 2000.

== Administration ==
Thal is one of the thirteen tehsils of the Pithoragarh district. The notification for formation of tehsil in Thal was issued on 30 September 2014, but the tehsil started functioning almost a year later from 13 September 2015. 114 villages of several Patwari areas of Berinag and Didihat tehsil were reorganised to form the Thal tehsil.

== Economy ==
The Thal fair used to be frequented by the Bhotiya traders, who used to sell utensils and wool for the last time before returning to Tibet. Apart from this, clothes from Kashipur and Almora and oil and chilli products from Sor and Sira were also bought and sold. A market was sanctioned under the scheme of Mandi Parishad in Thal to facilitate the local producers of vegetables, fruits and grains from Thal, Didihat, Munsiyari and Berinag.

== Transport ==
Thal was connected by a motor road with Almora in 1955, which connected Almora with Munsiari via Bageshwar, Udiyari and Thal.

== Education ==
Haridutt Pant Government Inter College is situated at Thal. In 2017, 350 students were studying here.
