= Administrative divisions of Uttarakhand =

Regional divisions in Uttarakhand

The northern Indian state of Uttarakhand, comprises 2 administrative divisions. Within these 2 divisions, there are a total of 13 districts. The following table shows the name of each division, its administrative headquarters, its constituent districts, and a map of its location.

== List of divisions ==
Divisions	Headquarters	Districts	Map
Garhwal	Pauri	Chamoli; Dehradun; Haridwar; Pauri Garhwal; Rudraprayag; Tehri Garhwal; Uttarkashi	
Kumaon	Nainital	Almora; Bageshwar; Champawat; Pithoragarh; Nainital; Udham Singh Nagar	

== See also ==
- List of districts of Uttarakhand
- List of parganas of Uttarakhand
- List of tehsils of Uttarakhand
- List of community development blocks of Uttarakhand
- List of divisions in India
