= Gaula Range, Lalkuan =

Village in Uttarakhand, India

Gola Range
- Village
- Location within Uttarakhand Location within India
- Coordinates: 29°08′41″N 79°23′37″E
- Country: India
- State: Uttarakhand
- District: Nainital
- Tehsil: Lalkuan

Government
  - Type: Village Panchayat

Area
  - Total: 43.13 km^{2} (16.65 sq mi)
- Elevation: 274 m (899 ft)

Population (2011)
  - Total: 56,331
  - Density: 1,306/km^{2} (3,383/sq mi)

Languages
  - Official: Hindi
- Time zone: UTC+5:30 (IST)
- PIN: 262402
- STD code: 05945
- Vehicle registration: UK-04

Gola Range is a village in Lalkuan Tehsil, Nainital District, Uttarakhand, India. It is situated on the banks of Gaula River, about 27 kilometres southeast of the district seat Nainital, and 15 kilometres northeast of the subdistrict seat Lalkuan. In the year 2011, it has a total population of 56,331.

== Geography ==
Gola Range is located on the south of the Sivalik Hills. The Uttarakhand State Highway 41 passes through the north of the village. It covers an area of 4312.63 hectares.

== Demographics ==
According to the 2011 Census of India, there are around 11,000 households within Gola Range. Among the 56,331 residents, 29,327 are male and 27,004 are female. The overall literacy rate is 71.26%, with 23,153 of the male population and 16,987 of the female population being literate. The village's census location code is 055621.
