= List of districts of Uttarakhand =

Districts of Uttarakhand

The Uttarakhand state of India, in Himalayas mountain range, has 13 districts.

== History ==
In November 2000 when Uttarakhand was created as a new state from the larger Uttar Pradesh state, it had inherited 13 districts. Since then, no new districts have been created even though other newly created states have almost doubled the number of new districts for rapid development.

== District administration ==
A district of Uttarakhand state is an administrative geographical unit, headed by a District Magistrate (earlier called District Collector), an officer belonging to the Indian Administrative Service. The district magistrates are assisted by a number of officers such as deputy collector, assistant collector, additional district magistrate, sub-divisional magistrate, tehsildar, naib tehsildar belonging to the Uttarakhand Civil Service and other Uttarakhand state services.

A Superintendent of Police, an officer belonging to the Indian Police Service, heads the police in the district and is entrusted with the responsibility of maintaining law and order and related issues. He is assisted by the officers of the Uttarakhand Police Service.

A Deputy Conservator of Forests, an officer belonging to the Indian Forest Service, is responsible for managing the Forests, environment and wild-life related issues of the district. He is assisted by the officers of the Uttarakhand Forest Service and other Uttarakhand forest officials and Uttarakhand wildlife officials.

Sectoral development is looked after by the district head of each development department such as Public works, Health, Education, Agriculture, Animal husbandry, etc. These officers belong to the various Uttarakhand state services.

== List of districts ==
Sl No	Code	District	Headquarters	Formed	Population (As of 2011)	Area (km^{2})	Density (/km^{2})	Division	Map
1	AL	Almora	Almora		621,972	3,083	201	Kumaon	
2	BA	Bageshwar	Bageshwar	16 September 1997	259,840	2,302	113	Kumaon	
3	CL	Chamoli	Gopeshwar		391,114	8,030	49	Garhwal	
4	CP	Champawat	Champawat	16 September 1997	259,315	1,781	146	Kumaon	
5	DD	Dehradun	Dehradun		1,695,860	3,088	550	Garhwal	
6	HA	Haridwar	Roshnabad	28 December 1988	1,927,029	2,360	817	Garhwal	
7	NA	Nainital	Nainital		955,128	3,860	247	Kumaon	
8	PG	Pauri Garhwal	Pauri		686,572	5,399	127	Garhwal	
9	PI	Pithoragarh	Pithoragarh	24 February 1960	485,993	7,100	68	Kumaon	
10	RP	Rudraprayag	Rudraprayag	16 September 1997	236,857	1,890	125	Garhwal	
11	TG	Tehri Garhwal	Tehri		616,409	4,080	151	Garhwal	
12	US	Udham Singh Nagar	Rudrapur	29 September 1995	1,648,367	2,908	567	Kumaon	
13	UT	Uttarkashi	Uttarkashi	24 February 1960	329,686	8,016	41	Garhwal	

== Proposals for new districts ==
The creation of new administrative districts in Uttarakhand has been a recurring political and administrative topic. In 2011, the state government announced plans to create four new districts: Yamunotri, Kotdwar, Ranikhet, and Didihat. However, these were not implemented due to subsequent changes in government. In 2016, a subsequent administration expanded this proposal to nine districts, incorporating the previous four alongside Rishikesh, Roorkee, Ramnagar, Kashipur, and Sitarganj-Khatima. As of present, these announcements have not been formally notified.

In addition to these state-level announcements, local representatives and leaders continuously petition for further decentralized administrative units to address challenges related to mountainous terrain, geographic isolation, and public service accessibility.

List of Proposed Districts in Uttarakhand Grouped by Current District
Proposed District	Proposed HQ	Expected Area of Jurisdiction	Rationale / Status
Proposed from Dehradun
Tiuni	Tyuni (Tiuni)	Remote mountainous tracts of Dehradun district.	Proposed by local elected representatives to improve administrative reach.
Chakrata	Chakrata	Chakrata sub-division of Dehradun district.	Proposed by elected representatives to cater to the distinct geographic and demographic needs of the region.
Proposed from Haridwar
Roorkee	Roorkee	Roorkee sub-division and surrounding areas in Haridwar district.	Announced as part of the 2016 state government proposal for new districts.
Proposed from Uttarkashi
Yamunotri	Yamunotri	Yamunotri valley and surrounding sub-divisions of Uttarkashi district.	Announced in 2011 and reiterated in 2016 state government proposals.
Gangotri	Gangotri	Gangotri and Purola tehsils of Uttarkashi district.	Proposed by local representatives for decentralized governance in the high-altitude border region.
Proposed from Chamoli
Ghastoli	Ghastoli	Kalindi Pass area and northern tracts of Chamoli district.	Proposed to improve administration in remote, high-altitude border regions.
Niti	Niti	Niti Valley in Chamoli district.	Proposed to address the geographic isolation of the region.
Karnaprayag	Karnaprayag	Karnaprayag and Tharali tehsils of Chamoli district.	Proposed by local representatives to improve local governance.
Proposed from Pauri Garhwal
Kotdwar	Kotdwar	Kotdwar sub-division of Pauri Garhwal district.	Announced in 2011 and reiterated in 2016 state government proposals.
Thalisain	Thalisain	Thalisain sub-division of Pauri Garhwal district.	Proposed to decentralize administration in the interior Garhwal hills.
Proposed from Almora
Ranikhet	Ranikhet	Ranikhet sub-division of Almora district.	Announced in 2011 and reiterated in 2016 state government proposals.
Syaldey-Ataliya	Syaldey / Ataliya	Western regions of Almora district.	Proposed by local representatives to bridge geographic distance to the district headquarters.
Proposed from Nainital
Haldwani	Haldwani	Haldwani sub-division and southern plains of Nainital district.	Proposed to manage the high population density and commercial growth separate from the hill administration.
Proposed from Udham Singh Nagar
Kashipur	Kashipur	Jaspur, Kashipur, and Bajpur tehsils.	Announced as part of the 2016 state government proposal for new districts.
Sitarganj-Khatima	Khatima	Khatima and Sitarganj tehsils.	Announced as part of the 2016 state government proposal for new districts.
Proposed from Pithoragarh
Didihat	Didihat	Didihat sub-division of Pithoragarh district.	Announced in 2011 and reiterated in 2016 state government proposals.
Milam	Meelam (Milam)	Northern border regions of Pithoragarh district.	Proposed to improve governance and infrastructure near the India-Tibet border.
Munsiari	Munsiari (Munsyari)	Munsiari sub-division of Pithoragarh district.	Proposed due to geographic remoteness and specific local developmental needs.
Dugtu	Dugtu	Panchachuli area of Pithoragarh district.	Proposed to assist with local administration in extreme terrain.
Gunji	Gunji	Far-eastern border tracts of Pithoragarh district.	Proposed for better border management and local service accessibility.
Dharchula	Dharchula	Dharchula sub-division of Pithoragarh district.	Proposed to decentralize administration from the district headquarters.
Proposed from Multiple Districts
Rishikesh	Rishikesh	Carved from Rishikesh tehsil (Dehradun), Narendra Nagar tehsil (Tehri Garhwal), and Yamkeshwar tehsil (Pauri Garhwal).	Announced as part of the 2016 state government proposal for new districts.
Ramnagar	Ramnagar	Carved from Ramnagar tehsil (Nainital), Molekhal tehsil (Almora), and Dhoomakot tehsil (Pauri Garhwal).	Announced as part of the 2016 state government proposal for new districts.

== See also ==
- Administrative divisions of Uttarakhand
- List of parganas of Uttarakhand
- List of tehsils of Uttarakhand
- List of community development blocks of Uttarakhand
