= Tyuni =

Administrative division of India

Tiuni
- Tehsil
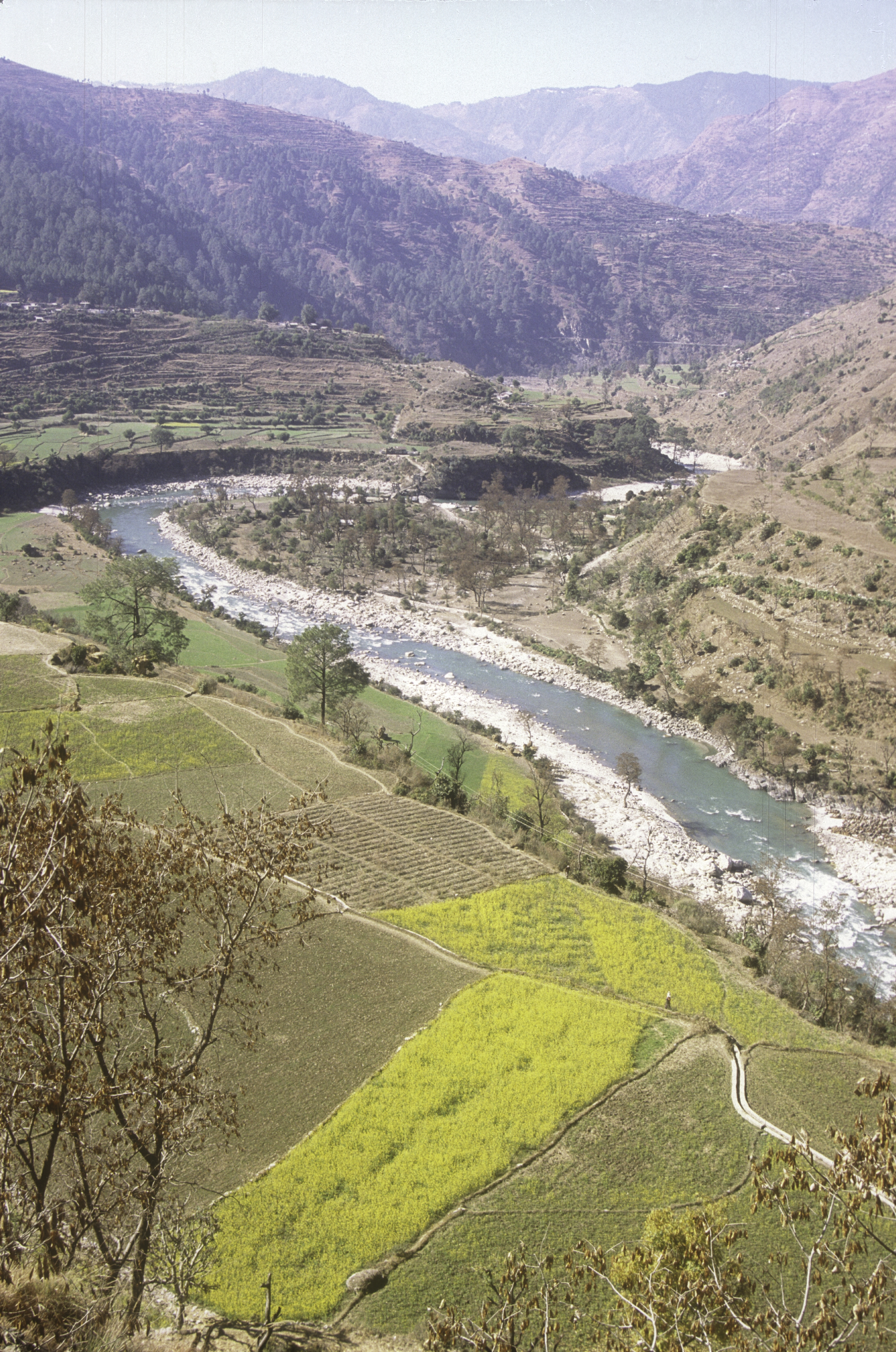
- Tons river from Tyuni
- Interactive map of Tiuni
- Location in Uttarakhand Tiuni (India)
- Country: India
- State: Uttarakhand
- District: Dehradun

Area
  - Total: 503.11 km^{2} (194.25 sq mi)

Population
  - Total: 33,926
- Pincode: 248199

Tehsil Tyuni (also written as Tiuni) is a tehsil, or administrative division, in the Dehradun district of the Indian state of Uttarakhand. It is located in the northern part of the district and shares its borders with the tehsil Chakrata to South, district Uttarkashi to North and Shimla district of Himachal Pradesh to the West.

== Geography ==
The tehsil headquarters is located in the town of Tyuni, which is also the largest town in the tehsil.

The tehsil headquarter is situated on the banks of Tons river, a major tributary of Yamuna. Situated around 170 km from the state's winter capital Dehradun, Tiuni is around 16 km from the Hanol temple of Mahasu, a key god in Hinduism. As it is a tribal belt, Tiuni celebrates some unique festivals like Maroj, Jagra, Bissu, Budhi Diwali and Jakholi fair.

== Economy ==
The economy of the tehsil is primarily agricultural, with crops such as rice and wheat being the main sources of income for the local population. The tehsil has an unfulfilled tourism potential with several places of archaeological and natural heritage nearby. Tiuni has many schools, one govt inter college, and a govt degree college. The tehsil is well-connected to the rest of the district and the state by a network of roads.

Ever since independence, the area is a bastion for Congress party. It is a part of Chakrata assembly constituency, dominated earlier by Gulab Singh and now his son Pritam Singh.

== Demographics ==
The population of the district as of 2011 census was 33,926, 17716 males and 16210 females for a sex ratio of 915 females per 1000 males. The tehsil comprises 82 villages with total of 4,715 households. Scheduled Castes and Scheduled Tribes accounts for 26.11% and 57.68% of the total population of the region. The town is also the largest one in the tribal belt of Jaunsar Bawar.
