= Pargana =

Former administrative unit of the Indian subcontinent

Pargana or parganah, also spelt pergunnah, equivalent to Mahal as a subunit of Subah (Suba), was a type of former administrative division in the Indian subcontinent during the time of the Delhi Sultanate, Mughal and British Colonial empires. Mughal Empire was divided into Subah (Suba) or province headed by a Subahdar, which were further subdivided into sarkars or tarafs, which in turn were further subdivided into groups of villages known as parganas or Mahallas (Mahal). Depending on the size, the parganas may or may not be further subdivided into pirs or mouzas which were the smallest revenue units, consisting of one or more villages and the surrounding countryside. In Bengal, the Sarkar system was replaced in the early 18th century by the Chakla system. In the Punjab region, the British established new Punjab Canal Colonies in which the smallest unit [equivalent to village or Mauza or pir] were termed Chak. Above-mentioned revenue units were used primarily, but not exclusively, by Muslim kingdoms. After Independence of India in 1947, the parganas became equivalent to Block/Tahsil, and pirs or mahals became Grampanchayat.

The Mughal government in the pargana consisted of a Muslim judge and local tax collector. Under the reign of Sher Shah Suri, administration of parganas was strengthened by the addition of other officers, including a shiqdar (police chief), an amin or munsif (an arbitrator who assessed and collected revenue) and a karkun (record keeper).

== Mughal era ==
In the 16th century the Mughal emperor Akbar organised the empire into subahs (roughly equivalent of state or province), which were further subdivided into sarkars (roughly the equivalent of districts), which were themselves organised into parganas (roughly the equivalent of district subdivisions such as tehsil). In the Mughal system, parganas served as the local administrative units of a sarkar. Individual parganas observed common customs regarding land rights and responsibilities, which were known as the pargana dastur, and each pargana had its own customs regarding rent, fees, wages, and weights and measures, known as the pargana nirikh.

Pargana consisted of several tarafs, which in their turn consisted of several villages plus some uninhabited mountain and forest land. During the reign of the Bahmani Sultanate in the Deccan, tarafs represented the provinces of the sultanate and its main territorial division. Tarafs were ruled by a tarafdar, the provincial governor, who held a significant amount of autonomy.

== British Indian Empire ==
As the British expanded into former Mughal provinces, starting with Bengal, they at first retained the pargana administration, but, under the Governorship of Charles Cornwallis, enacted the Permanent Settlement of 1793, which abolished the pargana system in favour of the zamindari system, in which zamindars were made the absolute owners of rural lands, and abolished the pargana dastur and pargana nirikh. British administration consisted of districts, which were divided into tehsils or taluks. Parganas remained important as a geographical term, persisting in land surveys, village identification and court decrees.

== Post independence ==
The pargana system persisted in several princely states, including Tonk and Gwalior. Parganas disappeared almost completely after the independence of India and Pakistan in 1947, although the term lives on in place names, like the districts of North 24 Parganas and South 24 Parganas in India's West Bengal state.

== See also ==
- Administrative divisions of India
- Punjab Canal Colonies
- Chak (village)
- Chakla (administrative division)
- List of parganas of Uttarakhand
