= Sahaspur, Uttarakhand =

Town in Uttarakhand, India

Coordinates: 30°23′33″N 77°48′33″E

Sahaspur is a town situated in the Sahaspur Assembly constituency of Dehradun District in Uttarakhand, India. It is situated 12km away from sub-district headquarter Vikasnagar (tehsildar office) and 23km away from district headquarter Dehradun. As per 2009 stats, Sahaspur is the gram panchayat of Sahaspur village.

The total geographical area of village is 424.94 hectares. Sahaspur has a total population of 8,841 peoples, out of which male population is 4,665 while female population is 4,176. Literacy rate of sahaspur village is 63.31% out of which 67.50% males and 58.62% females are literate. There are about 1,769 houses in sahaspur village. Pincode of sahas pur village locality is 248197.
