= Nandanagar =

Nandanagar formerly known as Ghat is a tehsil and nagar panchayat, located in the Chamoli district of the Indian state of Uttarakhand. The tehsil is located in the south central part of the district and is connected to Nandaprayag on the Badrinath Highway by a road.

The tehsil was created in 2012 by the then Chief Minister Vijay Bahuguna. Nandanagar tehsil is an agricultural area, with the main crops being rice, wheat, and maize. Recently, there was a demand to change the name of the town to Nandanagar from Ghat by the locals, after which the name of block was changed to Nandanagar, although the tehsil name remains unchanged.

The tehsil is located in middle Himalayas and has an ancient temple of Nanda Devi nearby. The area is often plagued by cloudbursts and landslides. The tehsil is well-connected by road and is served by the Rishikesh-Badrinath National Highway, which branches into a road to Nandanagar from Nandaprayag. The nearest major airport is Jolly Grant Airport in Dehradun, which is approximately 280 kilometers away.
