= Pokhari, Uttarakhand =

Pokhri tehsil is a town and tehsil (administrative division) in the Chamoli district of the Indian state of Uttarakhand. The tehsil is located in the western part of the district, and is bordered by Gopeshwar, Nandaprayag and Karnaprayag tehsils. The tehsil had a population of around 36,000 people in 2011 census. However, since then, the area of tehsil has shrunk due to creation of new tehsils. The current population is not exactly known but expected to be around 20,000.

Pokhri tehsil is primarily an agricultural area, with the majority of the population involved in farming and livestock rearing. The tehsil is also home to a number of small-scale industries, including handloom weaving, and many people are employed in tourism related activities. It's located at an altitude of 1900 metres above sea level and has a cool climate throughout the year.

The tehsil is home to a number of important tourist attractions, including the Nagnath Swami Temple as well as other remains of the Naga kings. Nagnath also has a British Era school established in 1901 that continues to function till date and has contributed to educational development in the region. Pokhri and nearby Mohankhal belt ( altitude - 2300 metres) witness heavy snowfall in winters which attracts tourists. Famous Kartik Swami Temple (altitude- 3048 metres) is located 15 km from Pokhri on Pokhri-Rudraprayag Road. The town offers splendid views of Himalayan peaks like Trishul, Nanda Ghunti, Doonagiri, Chaukhamba, Tungnath-Chandrashila.

The tehsil is well-connected to the rest of the district and the state by a network of roads and public transportation. The nearest airport is located in Gauchar, but regular flights are only till Dehradun, which is approximately 250 kilometers away. A new politechnic is proposed to be built in Pokhri.
