= Bhikiyasain =

Town and Tehsil in Uttarakhand, India

Bhikiyasain Bhikiasain
- Town
- Location in Uttarakhand, India Bhikiyasain (India)
- Coordinates: 29.6913°N 79.2687°E
- Country: India
- State: Uttarakhand
- Division: Kumaun
- District: Almora
- Elevation: 800 m (2,600 ft)

Languages
  - Official: Hindi
  - Native: Kumaoni
- Time zone: UTC+5:30 (IST)
- PIN: 263667
- Vehicle registration: UK 01
- Website: uk.gov.in

Bhikiyasain also spelled as Bhikiasain is a town and Tehsil in Almora district of Uttarakhand. It is located on the bank of the river Ramganga. Situated at an elevation of 1,450 meters (4,757 feet) in the Kumaon region, Bhikiyasain is situated 98 kms from district headquarters Almora.

== Geography ==
Bhikiyasain is situated in the Kumaon region of the central Himalayas, in an area characterized by mountain slopes, valleys, forests and cultivated terraces. The town lies at approximately 29°41′29″N 79°16′7″E and has an elevation of about 800 metres (2,600 ft) above sea level. The geography of the Bhikiyasain area is predominantly mountainous, with settlements and agricultural land distributed across valleys and slopes. The wider Bhikiyasain region has considerable variation in elevation ranging from approximately 554 metres to 2,148 metres, with an average elevation of about 1,236 metres. The landscape is characterized by forested hills, seasonal streams and terraced agricultural fields. The surrounding terrain forms part of the Himalayan drainage system, with the Ramganga River and its tributaries important to the wider region. The varied elevation produces differences in vegetation and local climatic conditions across the area.

== Climate ==
Bhikiyasain experiences a typical hill climate, with relatively mild summers, cool winters and most of its rainfall occurring during the southwest monsoon. The mountainous terrain and seasonal rainfall support forests and agriculture, while terraced cultivation is common on suitable slopes. The natural setting of Bhikiyasain, combining hills, river valleys and forested landscapes, is characteristic of the Kumaon Himalayas. Its relatively lower elevation compared with many higher Himalayan settlements also gives the town a warmer climate than the high-altitude areas farther north.
