= Purola =

- Town
- Location in Uttarakhand, India Purola (India)
- Coordinates: 30.8789°N 78.0852°E
- Country: India
- State: Uttarakhand
- District: Uttarkashi

Government
  - Type: Tehsil
  - Body: Nagar Palika Parishad
- Elevation: 1,524 m (5,000 ft)

Population (2011)
  - Total: 33,792

Languages
  - Native: Bangani
- Time zone: UTC+5:30 (IST)
- PIN: 249185
- Telephone code: 91-1373
- Vehicle registration: UK-10
- Website: uk.gov.in

Purola is a nagar palika and tehsil headquarters in the Uttarkashi district of the Indian state of Uttarakhand. It is located on the banks of the Tons river.

== Geography ==
Purola is a semi-urban settlement. It is famous for its Har-ki-Dun trek. It is around 158 kilometres from Chamba, 107 km from Uttarkashi and 133 km from capital Dehradun.

== Demographics ==
The population of the city is about 34,000. Most of the population speak Garhwali.

== Economy ==
The main occupation is agriculture, government, and business. It is near the Maneri Bhali Hydroelectric Project.

== Politics ==
This town comes under the Purola Assembly constituency and is a part of the Tehri Garhwal Lok Sabha constituency
