= Bageshwar district =

District of Uttarakhand in India

- District
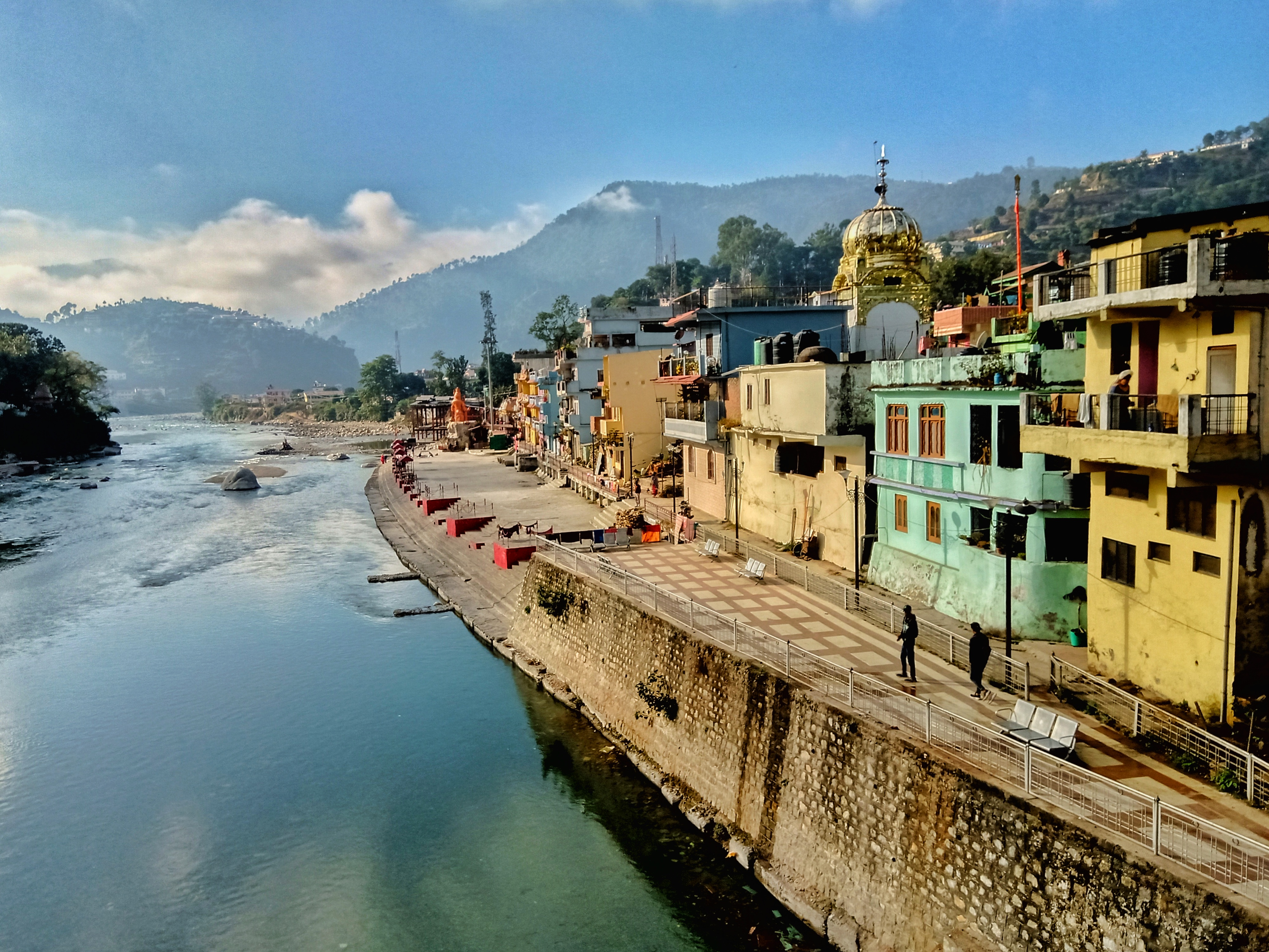
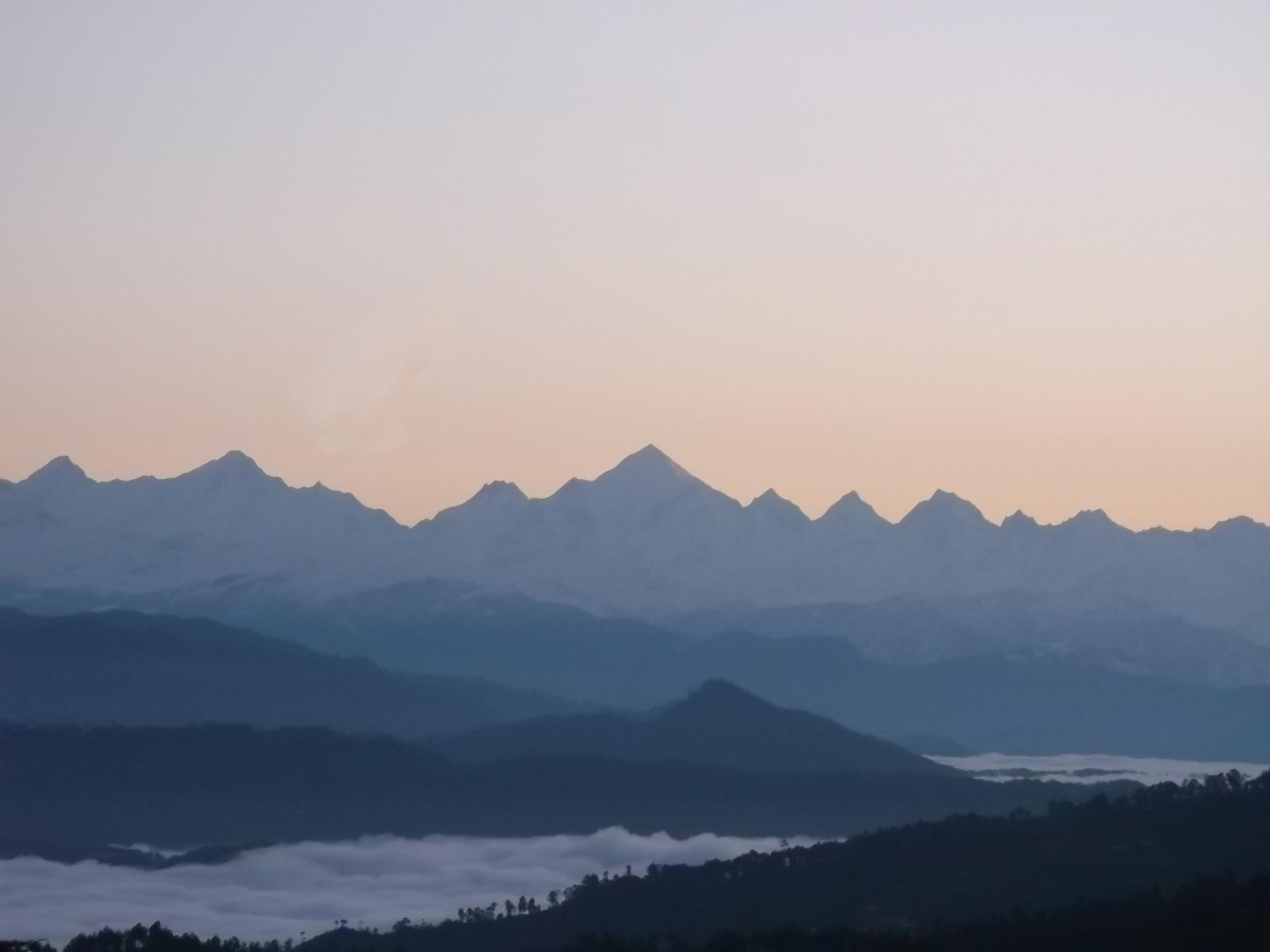
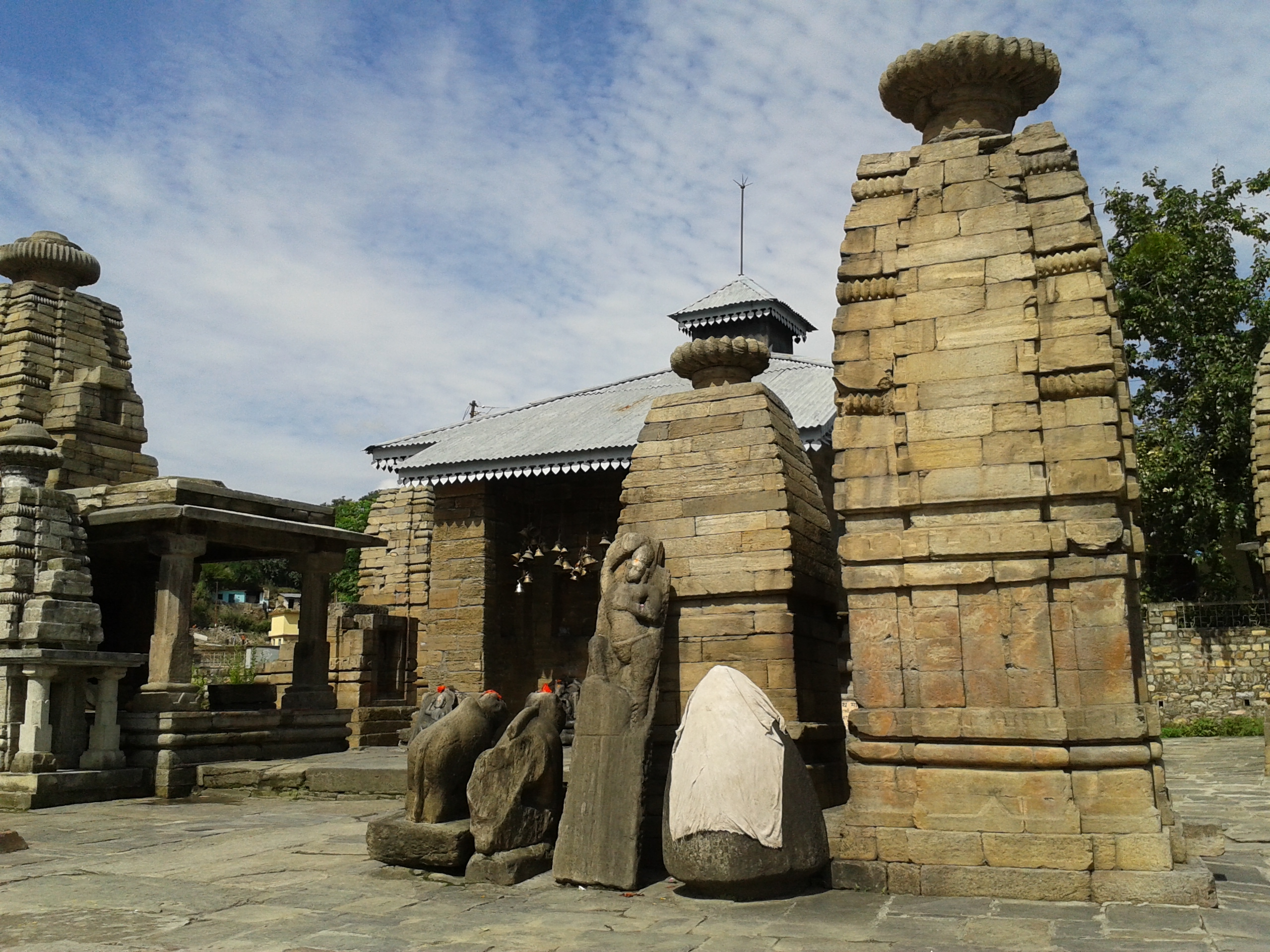
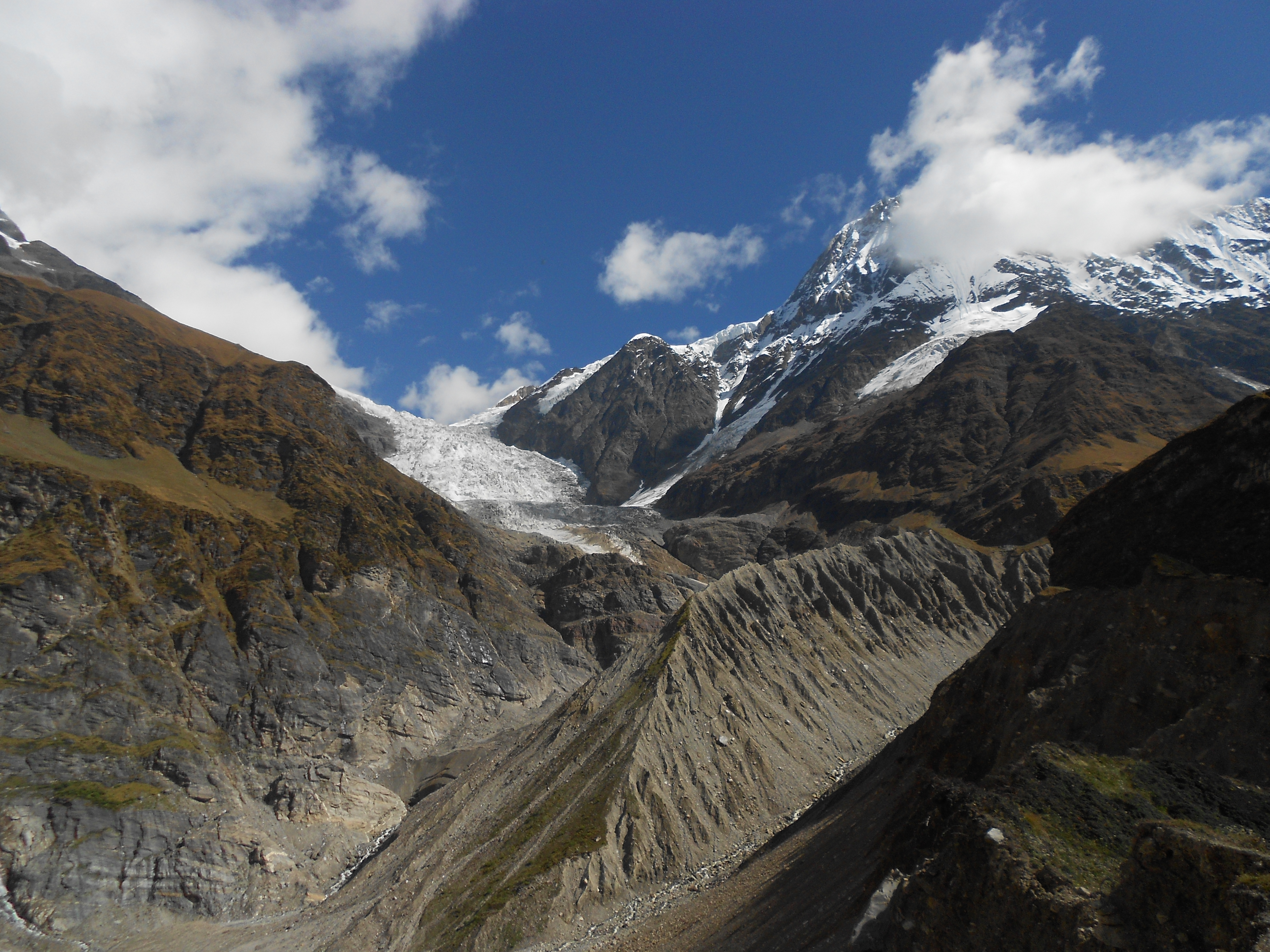
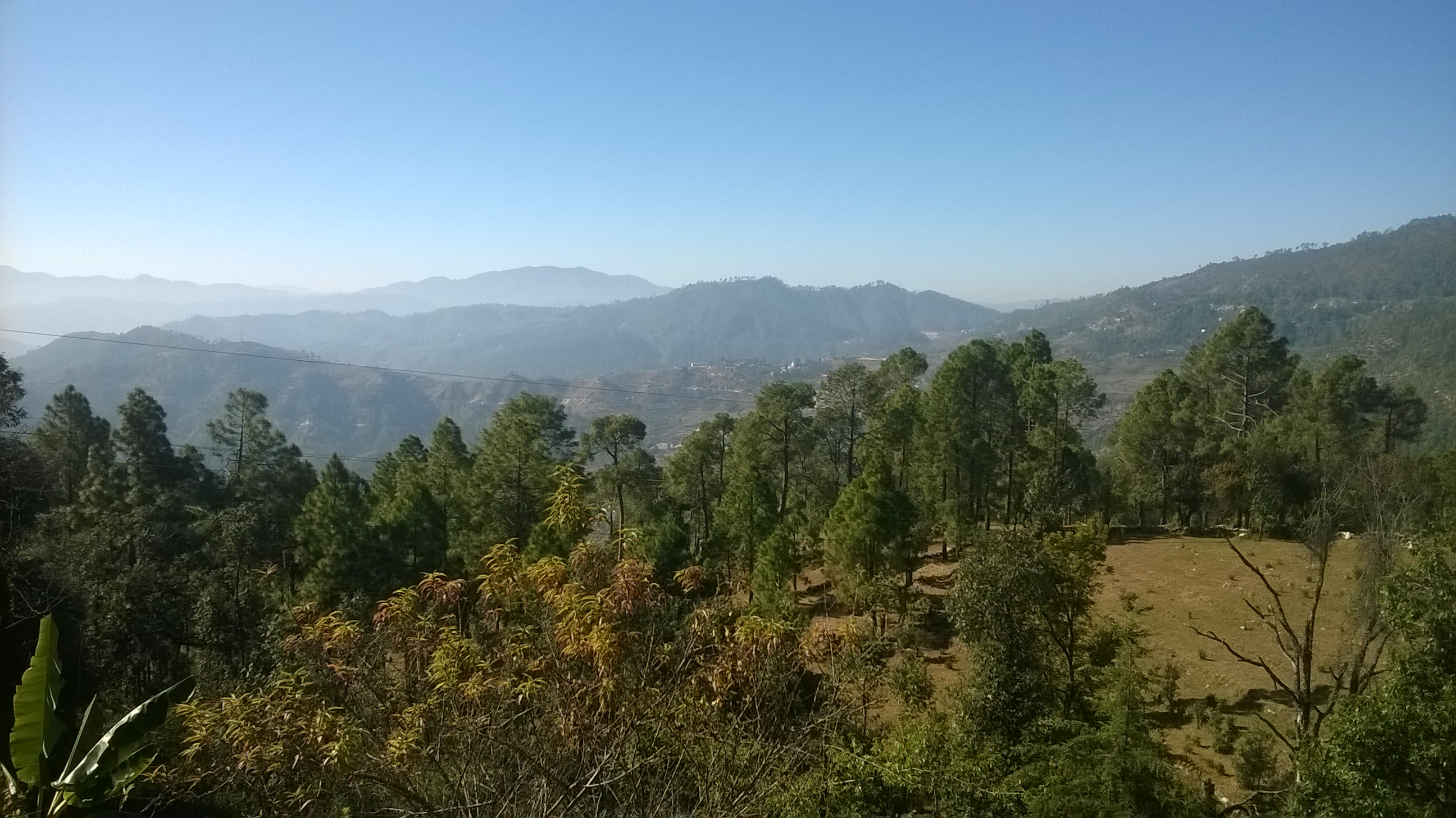
- Clockwise from top-left: Sarju river at Bageshwar, Panchachuli viewed from Kausani, Pindari Glacier, view from Vijaypur, Baijnath Temple
- Interactive map of Bageshwar district
- Coordinates: 29.85°N 79.77°E
- Country: India
- State: Uttarakhand
- Division: Kumaon
- Headquarters: Bageshwar

Government
  - District collector: Apurva Pandey, IAS

Area
  - Total: 2,302 km^{2} (889 sq mi)

Population
  - Total: 259,898
  - Density: 108/km^{2} (280/sq mi)

Languages
  - Official: Hindi
  - Native: Kumaoni
- Time zone: UTC+5:30 (IST)
- Website: bageshwar.nic.in

Bageshwar district is a district of Uttarakhand state in northern India. The town of Bageshwar is the district headquarters. Prior to its establishment as a district in 1997 it was part of Almora district.

Bageshwar district is in Kumaon, and is bounded on the west and northwest by Chamoli District, on the northeast and east by Pithoragarh District, and on the south by Almora District.

As of 2011 it is the third least populous district of Uttarakhand (out of 13), after Rudraprayag and Champawat.

== History ==
The area, that now forms Bageshwar district, was historically known as Danpur, and was ruled by Katyuris during the 7th century AD. After the disintegration of the Katyuri kingdom in the 13th century, the area remained under the rule of Baijnath Katyurs, direct descendants of Katyuri kings. In 1565, king Balo Kalyan Chand annexed Danpur along with Pali, Barahmandal and Mankot to Kumaun.

In 1791, Almora, the seat of the Kumaon, was invaded and annexed by the Gorkhas of Nepal. The Gorkhas ruled the region for 24 years and were later defeated by the East India Company in 1814, and were forced to cede Kumaon to the British as part of the Treaty of Sugauli in 1816. After its annexation by British, Bageshwar was a part of the Danpur pargana in Almora district of United Provinces.

Bageshwar was made a separate tehsil in 1974, and in 1976 it was declared a pargana, after which, it formally came into being as a large administrative center. Since 1985, the demand for declaring it a separate district of different parties and regional people started, and finally, in September 1997, Bageshwar was made the new district of Uttar Pradesh by Chief Minister Mayawati.

== Administration ==
For administrative convenience, Bageshwar is divided in four Tehsils, viz., Bageshwar—comprising 415 inhabited villages; 2) Kanda (with 180 inhabited villages); 3) Kapkot having 156 villages; and Garur having 197 revenue villages. Pattis (viz., Katyur—Talla, Malla and Bichalla; Dug; Kharahi; Danpur—Talla, Malla, Bichalla; Nakuri; Dafaut and Kamsyar—Walla and Palla) and Development BLOCKS are other administrative units.

Besides regular police at different Thanas like Bageshwar, Garur, Jhiroli, Kanda and Kapkot, the Patwaris (revenue officials) are also equipped with police power.

== Geography ==
From geographical point of view, Bageshwar district is hilly one—amidst Shivalik ranges and high Himalayas. Drainage system is from north to south-east. Main rivers flowing across Bageshwar are - Pindar, Saryu/Sarju, Gomati, and Pungar, the latter two being tributary of Sarju. Many other riverines, locally known as GADHERA meet these at different places. These three river valleys have made alluvial landforms locally known as Seras where majority of population is concentrated. Other villages are settled on hillocks having mild slopes/ or some flat landforms.

== Demographics ==
Religions in Bageshwar district (2011)
Religion	Percent
Hinduism	99.08%
Islam	0.55%
Other or not stated	0.37%
Distribution of religions

According to the 2011 census Bageshwar district has a population of 259,898, roughly equal to the nation of Vanuatu. This gives it a ranking of 578th in India (out of a total of 640). The district has a population density of 116 inhabitants per square kilometre (300/sq mi) . Its population growth rate over the decade 2001-2011 was 5.13%. Bageshwar has a sex ratio of 1093 females for every 1000 males, and a literacy rate of 80.69%. Scheduled Castes and Scheduled Tribes make up 27.73% and 0.76% of the population respectively.

Languages of Bageshwar district (2011)
1. Kumaoni (93.9%)
2. Hindi (4.11%)
3. Garhwali (0.74%)
4. Other (1.28%)

The major first language of the district is Kumaoni, which accounted for approximately 94% of the population according to the 2011 census.

Bageshwar district: mother-tongue of population, according to the 2011 Indian Census.
Mother tongue code	Mother tongue	People	Percentage
006102	Bhojpuri	200	0.1%
006195	Garhwali	1,867	0.7%
006240	Hindi	10,680	4.1%
006340	Kumaoni	243,965	93.9%
014011	Nepali	2,158	0.8%
022015	Urdu	222	0.1%
046003	Halam	157	0.1%
–	Others	649	0.2%
Total		259,898	100.0%

As of 2001 Indian census, the Bagheswar district had a population of 249,462. Hindus 247,402, Muslims 1,280 (.51%), Christians 361.

Historical population
Year	Pop.	±% p.a.
1901	68,144	—
1911	78,968	+1.49%
1921	79,675	+0.09%
1931	87,633	+0.96%
1941	103,254	+1.65%
1951	116,116	+1.18%
1961	132,691	+1.34%
1971	164,746	+2.19%
1981	196,992	+1.80%
1991	226,164	+1.39%
2001	247,163	+0.89%
2011	259,898	+0.50%

== Assembly Constituencies ==
1. Kapkote
2. Bageshwar (SC)

== Villages ==
- Raulyana

Kuroli

Kuroli is a village situated in the bageshwar which has an approximated population of 1 thousand peoples.
