= Chamoli district =

- District of Uttarakhand
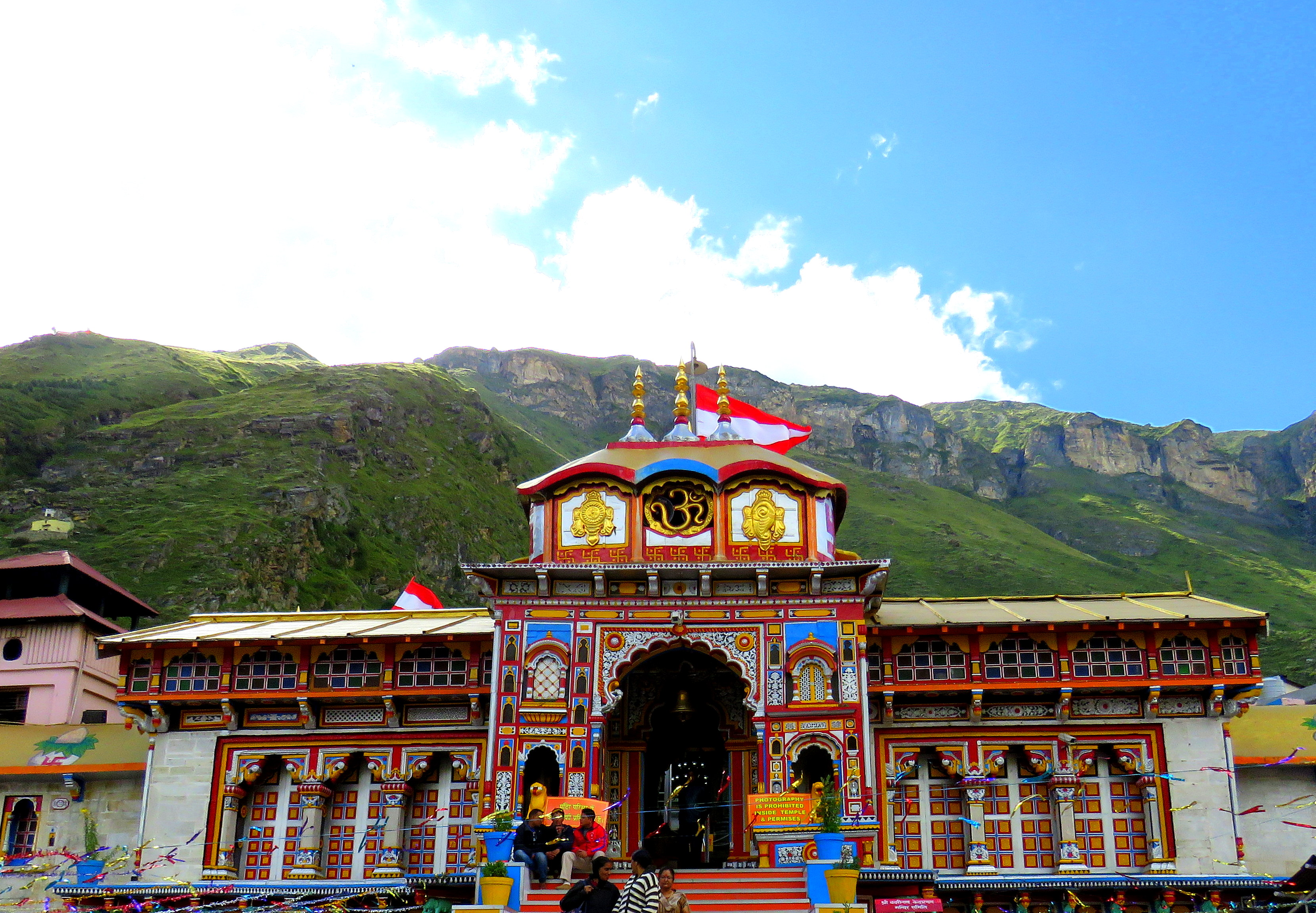
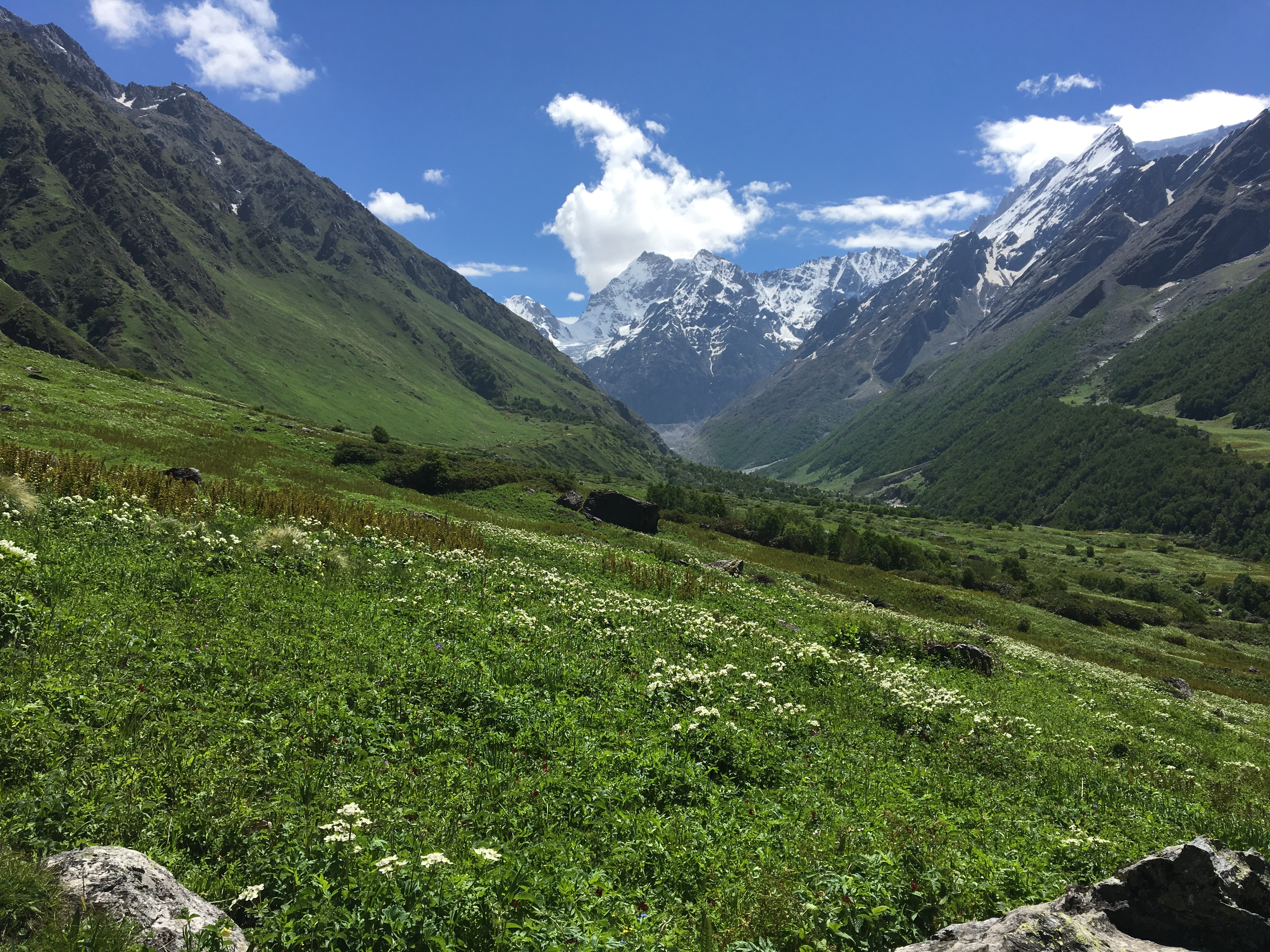
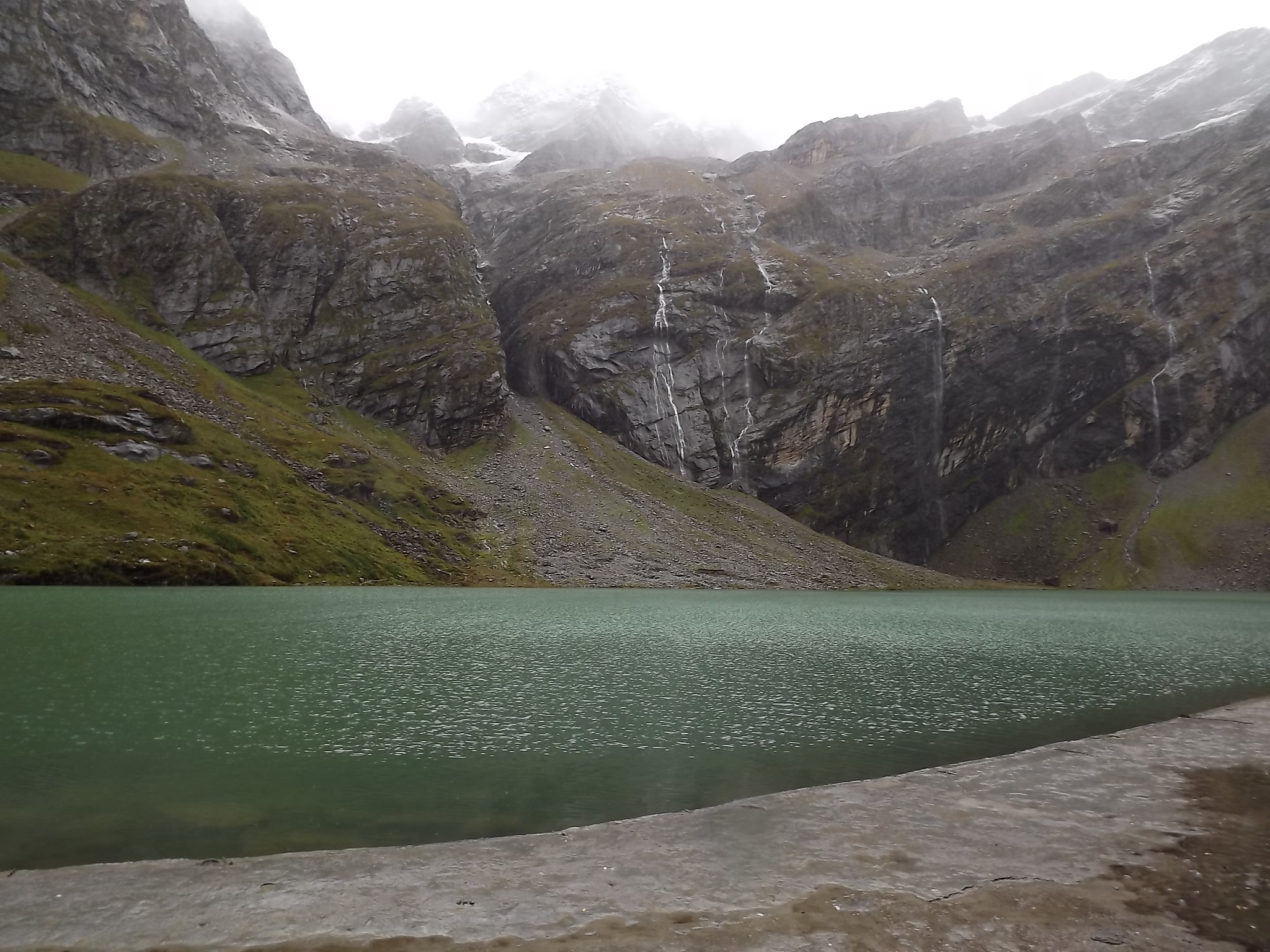
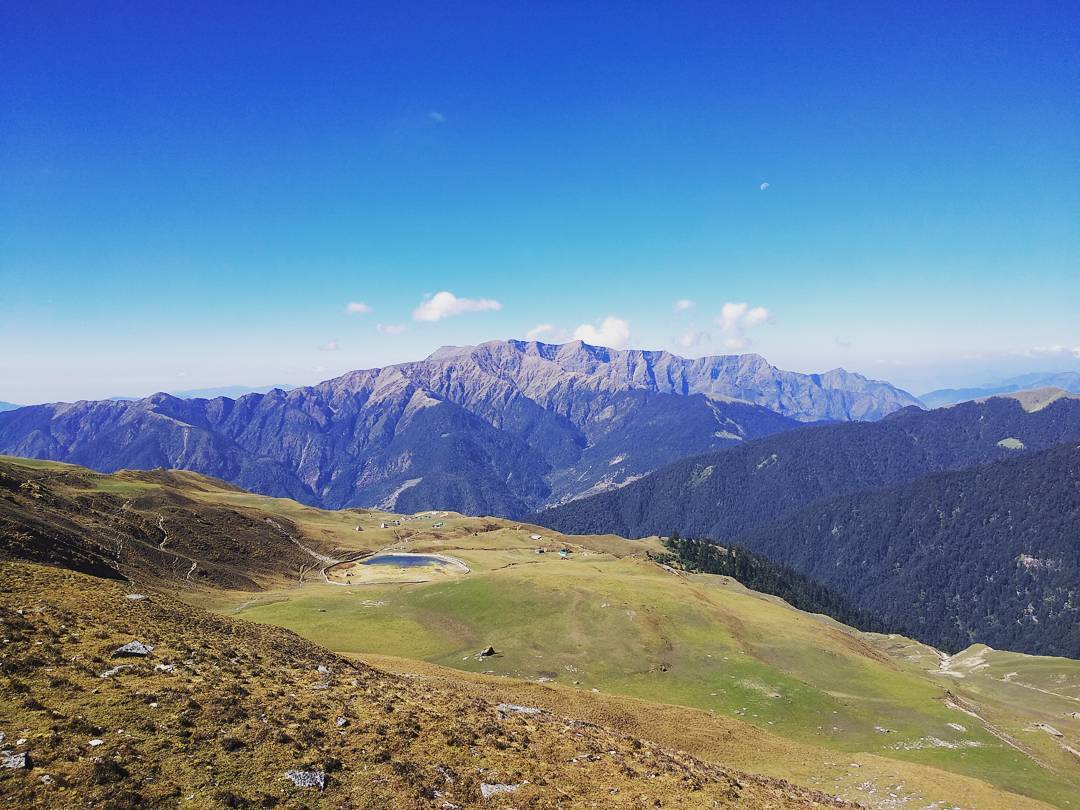
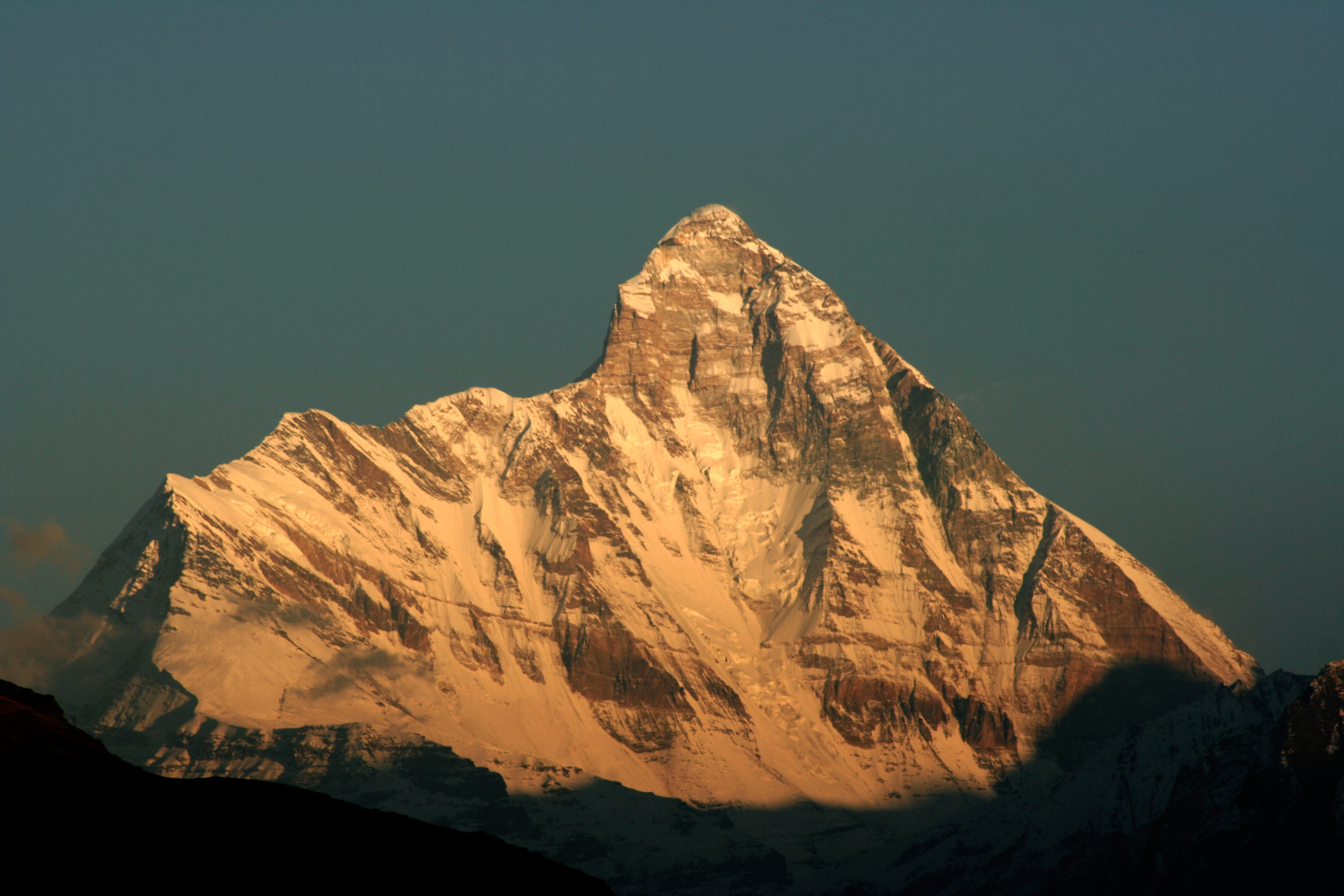
- Clockwise from top-left: Badrinath Temple, Valley of Flowers National Park, Bedni Bugyal, Nanda Devi, Hemkund Sahib
- Interactive map of Chamoli district
- Coordinates: 30.42°N 79.33°E
- Country: India
- State: Uttarakhand
- Division: Garhwal
- Established: 24 February 1960
- Headquarters: Chamoli Gopeshwar
- Tehsils: 12

Government
  - District collector: Gaurav Kumar IAS
  - Lok Sabha constituency: Garhwal
  - Vidhan Sabha constituencies: Badrinath, Karnaprayag, Tharali(SC)

Area
  - Total: 8,030 km^{2} (3,100 sq mi)
  - Rank: I in the state
- Highest elevation (Nanda Devi): 7,817 m (25,646 ft)
- Lowest elevation (Gauchar): 800 m (2,600 ft)

Population
  - Total: 391,605
  - Density: 49/km^{2} (130/sq mi)

Language
  - Official: Hindi
  - Regional: Garhwali; Rongpo
- Time zone: UTC+5:30 (IST)
- Vehicle registration: UK 11
- Website: chamoli.nic.in

Chamoli district is a district of the Uttarakhand state of India. It is bounded by Tibet to the north, and by the Uttarakhand districts of Pithoragarh and Bageshwar to the east, Almora to the south, Pauri Garhwal to the southwest, Rudraprayag to the west, and Uttarkashi to the northwest. The administrative headquarters of Chamoli district is in Gopeshwar.

Chamoli hosts a variety of destinations of pilgrim and tourist interest including Badrinath, Hemkund Sahib and Valley of Flowers. The Chipko movement was first started in Chamoli.

== Etymology ==
The name "Chamoli" is derived from the Sanskrit word chandramoli which stands for "One who wears the moon on his head" denoting the Hindu god Shiva.

== History ==
The region covered by the district of Chamoli formed part of the Pauri Garhwal district till 1960. It occupies the northeastern corner of the Garhwal tract and lies in the central or mid-Himalayas in the very heart of the snowy range described in ancient books as Bahirgiri, one of the three divisions of the Himalayan mountains.

Chamoli, the district of "Garhwal" the land of forts. Today's Garhwal was known as Kedar-khand in the past. In puranas Kedar-khand was said to be abode of Hindu God. It seems from the facts vedas puranas, Ramayna and Mahabharat that these Hindu scriptures are scripted in kedar-khand. It is believed that Hindu God Ganesha wrote first script of vedas in Vayas gufa situated in the last village Mana only 4 km (2.5 mi) from Badrinath.

According to Rigveda (1017–19) after Inundation (Jalprlya) Sapt-Rishis saved their lives in the same village Mana. Besides there the roots of vedic literature seems to be originated from Garhwal because the Garhwali language has a lot of words common with Sanskrit. The work place of vedic Rishis are the prominent pilgrim places in Garhwal specially in chamoli like Atrimuni Ashram in Anusuya about 25 km (16 mi) from chamoli town and work place of Kashyap Rishi at Gandhmadan parwat near Badrinath. According to Aadi-Puran, vedvyasa scripted the story of Mahabhrat in Vyas Gufa near Badrinath. Pandukeshwar, a small village situated on the Rishikesh Badrinath high-way from where Badrinath is just 25 km (16 mi) away is regarded as Tapsthali (place where one practices Hindu religious austerities) of King Pandu. In Kedar-khand Puran this land is regarded the land of lord Shiva.

The authentic script about the history of Garhwal is found only 6th AD onward. Some of the oldest examples of these are the trishul in Gopeshwar, lalitsur in Pandukeshwar. The Narvaman rock script in siroli the chand pur Gari rock script by king Kankpal authenticates the history and culture of Garhwal.

vashudev established his regime on the northern border of garhwal and founded his capital in joshimath then Kartikeypur. Vashudev katyuri was the founder of katyura dynasty in Garhwal and they reign Garhwal over hundreds of years in this period of katyuri regime Aadi Sankaracharya visited Garhwal and established Jyotrimath (now in Chamoli) which is one of the four Mathas established by Aadi Sankaracharya. In Bharat varsh other these are Dwarika, Puri and Sringeri. He also reinstated idol of Lord Badrinath in Badrinath(town), before this the idol of Badrinath was hidden in Narad-Kund by the fear of Budhas. After this ethicist of vaidic cult started to pilgrim Badrinath.

According to Pt. Harikrishna Raturi, King Bhanu Pratap was the first ruler of Panwar dynasty in Garhwal who founded Chanpur-Garhi as his capital. This was the strongest garh (fort) of the fifty-two in of garhwal.

The devastating earthquake of 8 September 1803 weakened the economic and administrative set-up of Garhwal state. Taking advantage of the situation, Gorkhas attacked Garhwal under the command of Amar Singh Thapa and Hastidal Chanturia. They established there, reign over half of the Garhwal in 1804 up to 1815 this region remain under Gorkha rule.

Meanwhile, the king of the Panwar dynasty, Raja Sudarshan Shah, contacted the East India Company and sought help. With the help of the British he defeated the Gorkas and merged the eastern part of Alaknanda and Mandakini along with the capital Srinagar and the capital of Garhwal was set up at Tehri instead of Srinagar. In the beginning, British rulers kept this area under Dehradun and Saharanpur. But later on, the British established a new district in this area and named it Pauri. Today's Chamoli was a tehsil of the same. On 24 February 1960, tehsil Chamoli was upgraded to a new district. In October 1997, two complete tehsil and two other blocks (partially) of district Chamoli were merged into a new formed district, Rudraprayag.

== Geography ==
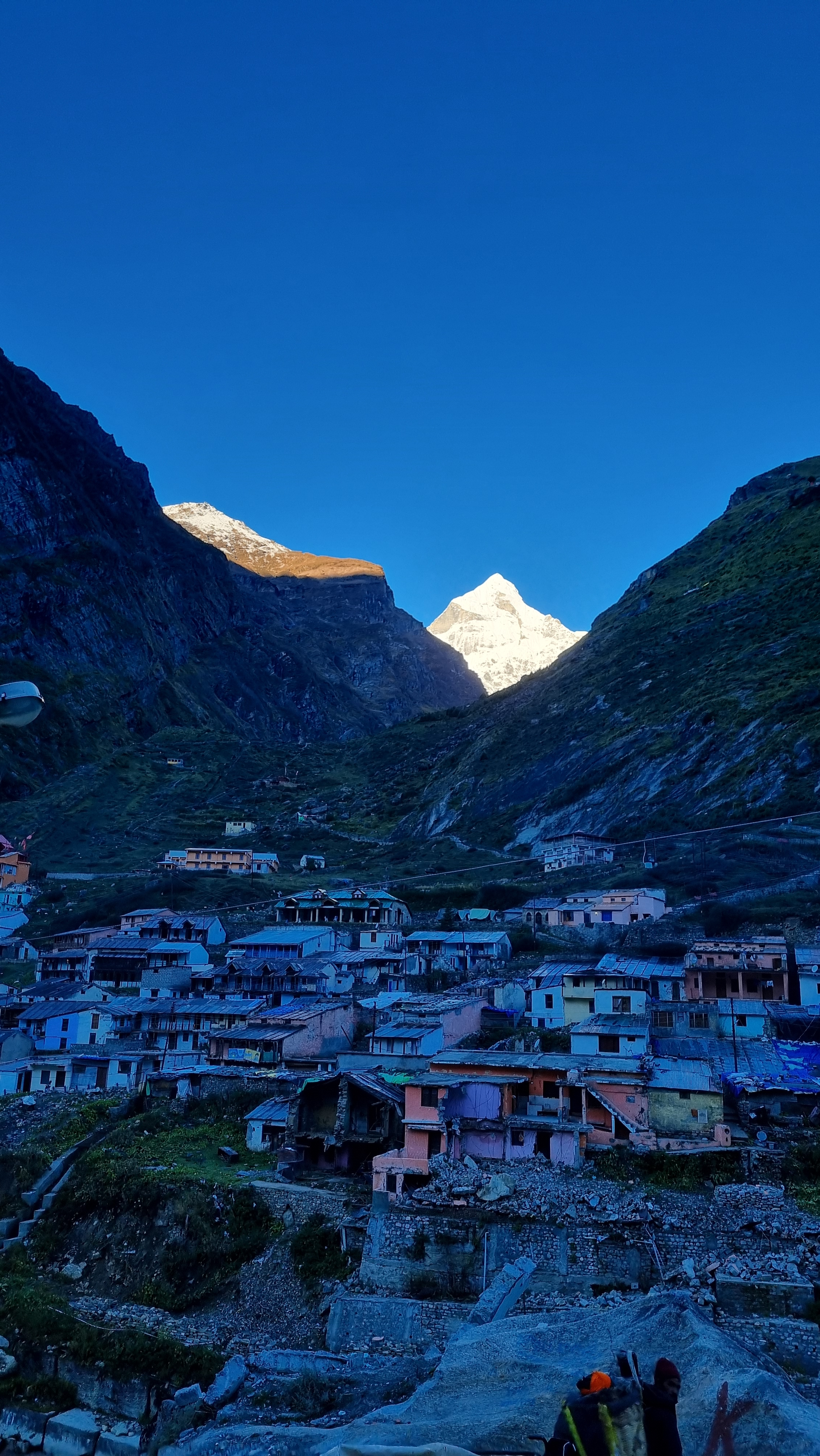
Mana village and Badrinath parvat in Chamoli district

Chamoli, carved as a separate revenue district in 1960 out of the erstwhile Garhwal district, lies in the Central Himalaya and constitutes a part of the celebrated 'Kedar Kshetra'. Chamoli District is surrounded by Uttarkashi in the northwest, Pithoragarh in the east, Bageshwar in the southeast, Almora in the west, Pauri Garhwal in the southwest and Rudraprayag in the west. The geographical area of the district is around 7,520 km^{2} (2,900 sq mi).

=== Climate ===
As the elevation of the district ranges from 800 m to 8,000 m above sea level the climate of the district vary largely depending on the altitude. The winter season is from about mid November to March. As most of the region is situated on the southern slopes of the outer Himalayas, monsoon currents can enter through the valley, the rainfall being heaviest in the monsoon from June to September.

=== River system ===
Chamoli district is crisscrossed by several important rivers and their tributaries. Alaknanda, traversing a distance of 229 km. before it confluence with Bhagirathi at Devprayag and constituting the Ganges, is the major river.

The Alaknanda originates at a height of 3641 meters below Balakun peak 16 km. upstream from Badrinath form the two glaciers of Bhagirath Kharak and Satopanth. The two glaciers rise from the eastern slopes of Chaukhamba (7140 meters) peak, Badrinath peak and its satellite peaks. These peaks separates the Gangotri group of glaciers in the west. The major portion of the Alaknanda basin falls in Chamoli district. From its source up to Hallang (58 km), the valley is treated as upper Alaknanda valley. The remaining part of the area is known as lower Alanknanda valley. While moving from its source, the river flows in a narrow deep gorge between the mountain slopes of Alkapuri, from which it drives its name. All along its course, it drains its tributaries:

1. Saraswati joins the Alaknanda 9 km downstream from Mana.
1. Khir Ganga joins it below the Badrinath shrine and Bhyundar Ganga originated from Tipra glacier and Hemkund Sahib joins Alaknanda River at Govindghat after merging with River Pushpawati at Ghangaria.
1. Dhauliganga meets at Vishnuprayag above Joshimath. The river Dhauliganga rises from the Nitti Pass at about 5070 meters. Its valley lies between the Kamet groups of peaks in the west and Nandadevi group in the east. The Dhauli takes a northern course at Malari. Between Malari and Tapovan, it is almost a narrow gorge with perpendicular cliffs on either side. several thousand meters high. the Dhauliganga in its turn is fed by GirthiGanga at Kurkuti and Rishiganga 500 metres below Reni.
1. Downstream small tributaries – Helang, Garud, Patal and Birahiganga join the Alaknanda between Joshimath and Chamoli.
1. Nandakini, which rises from Semudra Glaciers drainage the western slopes of Trishul mountains, joins it at Nandprayag.
1. Southeast, river Pindar joins the Alaknanda at Karnprayag. The Pindar river is fed by the Milam and Pindar glacier from the Nandadevi group of glacier. The Pindar river, before joining Alaknanda, is fed by Kaliganga and Bheriganga.

The rivers of Chamoli district, generally flow with great force in steep and narrow channels often resulting in excessive erosion and collapse of the banks.

==== Nanda Devi glacier flood ====
On 7 February 2021 a part of Nanda Devi, a Himalayan glacier, broke away at Joshimath. This caused water levels in the Rishiganga and Dhauliganga rivers to rise. One dam at the Rishiganga Hydroelectric Project was destroyed and another, the Dhauliganga Hydropower Project at Reni village, suffered a partial collapse. Initial reports said eleven people were dead and 170 missing. Water levels on the Alaknanda also rose. Five bridges were destroyed, and flood alerts were issued for Pauri, Tehri, Rudraprayag, Haridwar, and Dehradun regions. In order to reduce rising water levels on the Alaknanda, the flow of the Bhagirathi River was stopped.

=== Assembly Constituencies ===
1. Badrinath
2. Tharali (SC)
3. Karnprayag

== Demographics ==
Religions in Chamoli district (2011)
Religion	Percent
Hinduism	98.52%
Islam	1.12%
Other or not stated	0.26%
Distribution of religions

In 2022, Chamoli district had a population of 691,605, roughly equal to the nation of Maldives. This gives it a ranking of 559th in India (out of a total of 640). The district has a population density of 49 inhabitants per square kilometre (130/sq mi). Its population growth rate over the decade 2001–2011 was 5.6%. Chamoli has a sex ratio of 1021 females for every 1000 males, and a literacy rate of 83.48%. Scheduled Castes and Scheduled Tribes make up 20.25% and 3.13% of the population respectively.

Languages of Chamoli district (2021)
1. Garhwali (90.0%)
2. Hindi (5.00%)
3. 1.59%
4. Nepali (1.38%)
5. Kumaoni (0.95%)
6. Others (1.43%)

The major predominant first language of the district is Garhwali, which according to the 2011 census was spoken by 90% of the population. Hindi, though widely used a lingua franca, is the first language of 5.1%, while smaller communities include speakers of Bhotia (1.6%), Nepali (1.4%), Kumaoni (1%) and Rongpo

40).).

== Culture, fair and festival ==
=== Food ===
The staple grains consumed by the people of the district are wheat, rice, maze, mandua and jhanjora, the last three being coarse grains generally eaten by the poorer sections. The pulses consumed are urad, gahat, bhatt, soontha, tur, lopia and masor.

=== Recreation ===
Living in the mountains mostly in places that are not easily accessible, the people of the district have been able to preserve their culture, folklore, folksongs and folk dances, the last, a distinctive feature of the district, being seasonal, traditional and religious, some of the better known being described below.

The Thadiya dance, which is accompanied by song, is performed on Basant Panchami, the festival celebrating the advent of Spring, the Mela, another dance, is perform on Deepawali and the Pandava during the winter after the harvesting of the crop and depicts the principal events of the Mahabharata. Other folk dances are Jeetu Bhagdawal and Jagar or Ghariyali. These dances enact mythological stories, the participants, both men and women, put on their traditional colourful dress and dance to the tune of drums and Ransinghas. Another dance performed during the fairs and accompanied by song is the Chanchari, in which both men and women participate.

Folk songs are usually traditional and are sung particularly by the women, who work very hard in the fields from morning till night in all kind of weather. During the month of Chaitra the women of the village gather at a central place and sing traditional song which generally relate deeds of heroism, love and the hard life which they have to lead in the hills. In the district, fairs, festivals, religious and social gatherings are the main occasions for recreation and amusement. On special occasions people arrange swangs (open air dramatic performances) particularly depicting scenes or legends connected with Shiva and Parvati.

=== Fairs and festivals ===
Festivals play an important role in the life of people in the district, as elsewhere, and are spread over the entire year, the most important being briefly described below.

Ram Navami falls on the ninth day of the bright half of Chaitra to celebrate the birthday of Rama. The followers of Rama in the district observe fast throughout the day and the Ramayana is read and recited and people gather to listen to the recitations.

Nag Panchmi is celebrated in the district on the fifth day of the bright half of Sravana to appease the Nagas or serpent gods. Figures of snakes are drawn in flour in wooden boards and are worshipped by the family by offering milk, flowers and rice.

Raksha-Bandhan is traditionally associated with the Brahmanas and falls on the last day of Sravana. On this occasion a sister ties a Rakshasutra (thread of protection)—commonly known as Rakhi—round the right wrist of her brother in token of the protection she expects to receive from him. Fairs are held on this occasion at Kedarnath, Karnaprayag and Nandprayag.

Janmastami – the festival celebrating the birth of Krishna, falls on the eighth day of the dark half of Bhadra. As in other parts of the state, devotees in the district fast the whole day, breaking their fast only at mid-night when worshipers throng the temples and foregather to have a Jhanki (glimpse) of the shrines and cradles specially installed, decorated and illuminated in homes and other places to commemorate the deity's birth. A special feature of this festival is the singing of devotional songs in praise of Krishna in shrines and homes. The Chhati (sixth-day ceremony after birth) is also celebrated by the devout. The festival is celebrated with great enthusiasm at Nagnath, Badrinath and Kedarnath.

Dusshera – falls on the tenth day of the bright half of Asvina and commemorates the victory of Rama over Ravana, the preceding nine days being celebrated as Navaratri dedicated to the worship of the goddess Durga. Ramlila celebrations are held at different places in the district particularly at Kalimath.

Dipawali – the festival of lights, is celebrated in the district, as elsewhere, on the last day of the dark half of Kartika when the houses are illuminated and the goddess Lakshmi is worshipped. Festivities start two days earlier, with Dhanteras, when metal utensils are purchased as a token of the desired prosperity, followed by Naraka Chaturdashi when a few small earthen lamps are lit as a preliminary to the main day of festival. For traders and businessmen Dipawali marks the end of the fiscal year and they pray for prosperity in the new year. On this occasion the people of the district perform mela nritya, a type of folk dance, a distinctive feature of the district.

Makar Sankranti – a bathing festival which falls either on 13 or 14 January when people take bath in the Alaknanda and big fairs (Uttarayni) are held at Karanprayag and Nandprayag.

Shiv-ratri – falls on the 14th day of the dark half of Phalgun and is observed in the honour of Shiva. People fast throughout the day and a vigil is kept at night when the deity is worshipped. The Shiva temples are specially decorated and illuminated and large numbers of devotees offer water and flowers to the symbols and images of Shiva and sing devotional songs in his praise. Big fairs are held on this occasion at most of the Shiva temples of the district particularly at Dewal, Bairaskund, Gopeshwar, and Nagnath.

Holi – the spring festival, is celebrated on the full moon day of Phalgun. People start singing Phaags (Songs of Phalgun) during the nights, long before the festival. A flag or banner is installed at a central place in the village on the 11th day of bright of Phalgun and is burnt on the 15th day which is known as Chharoli when ash mark is put on the foreheads of friends and relatives. The following day is marked by common rejoicing when, till about noon, people throw coloured water and coloured powder on each other and in evening visit relatives and friends.

Many fairs are held in the district, the important ones being mentioned below.

On the 13th day of April every year the big fair known as Bishwat Sankranti is held in the district. This fair is also mentioned in the Pandukeshwar inscription of Lalitashuradeva issued in the 22nd regnal year. It is also held at Ming (14 April), Aser (15 April), Hans Koti (16 April), and Kulsari and Adbadri (17 April). Another important fair of the district is the Gaucher Mela held at Gaucher in Karnprayag in the month of November every year and is attended by number of persons. Others fairs of importance are the Nautha at Adbadri, Naumi at Hariyali, Nanda Devi at Bedni, Dattatreya Pooranmasi at Ansuya temple, Nagnath at Dewar Walla.

Nanda Devi Raj Jaat – Nanda Raj Jaat, the big pilgrimage of Nandadevi, is unique to Chamoli. It is very old traditional pilgrimage from the time of shalipal in the ninth century. There are no historical records but it is gathered from the local folklores and folksongs (jagori) that Shahipal who had his capital at Chandpur Garhi, buried a tantric instrument at Nauti nearby, and installed his patron-goddess Nandadevi (Raj Rajeshwari) there. The Royal priest, Nautiyal, of Nauti was made responsible for regular worship of the goddess.

King Shahipal started a tradition that a big pilgrimage (Nanda Raj Jat) would be organised every twelfth year to escort Nandadevi to her in-law's place, near Nanda Ghungti peak. When the capital was shifted by Ajay Pal, Kunwar (the younger brother of the king), who gad settled at Kansuwa nearby, was authorised to organise Raj Jat on behalf of King.

Traditionally the Kunwar comes to Nauti to seek the blessing of the Devi to organise the Jat. A four horned ram takes birth in Kasuwa area thereafter. A time schedule is drawn up for the Jat so as to reach Homkund on the Nandashtami day in August/September, and Kulsari on the preceding new moon for special worship.

Accordingly, the Kunwar reaches Nauti with the four horned ram and ringal umbrella. The Raj Jat starts on the long round-trek of about 280 km. with 19 halts on the way, taking about 19 days. Bhumiyal, Ufrai and Archana Devis are worshipped prior to the departure. The golden image of Nandadevi is carried in a silver palanquin and thousands of devotees follow in a long procession.

Great festivities and religious observances mark the Jaat wherever they halt or pass through. The procession swells as it advances with various groups joining from far and near with their idols and umbrellas. Special mention may be made of those coming from kurud from Ghat, Lata near Tapovan and Almora in Kumaon. Some 300 idols and decorated umbrellas assembles at Wan, en route Hemkund.

Mass participation and religious devotion are unmatched, for the Jat involves a long and arduous journey over treacherous terrains rising to an altitude of 5,335 m at Jiura Gali Dhar from a near 900 m at Nauti, walking barefoot over snow and moraines and passing through deep forests.

At Shail Samundra the pilgrims see three lights and a streak of smoke just before dawn as a divine beckon.

Surprisingly the four horned ram, loaded with the offerings for the goddess, guides the procession of devotees from the Nauti till it reaches Hemkund, near the base of Nanda Ghungti, resting every night near the Nauti umbrella of the goddess. At Hemkund it manifests human emotions and tears are seen in its eyes before it leaves everyone behind to get lost towards the mountains, laden with the offering of the devotees for the goddess Nandadevi.

There is a unique custom of keeping everyone's house unlocked in Wan village for the use of the yatris on the Jat day, according to the divine instruction of the goddess Nandadevi, and it is followed religiously. The last NandaDevi Raj Jat was held during August/September 2000. Smaller Raj Jaats are organised annually from Kurud village near Ghat, covering a smaller circuit in August–September.

== Notable people ==
- Gaura Devi
- Chandi Prasad Bhatt
- Kamla Pant
- Vijay Prasad Dimiri
- Tripti Dimri
- Totakacharya

== See also ==
- 1999 Chamoli earthquake
- Chamoli Gopeshwar
