= Almora district =

- District
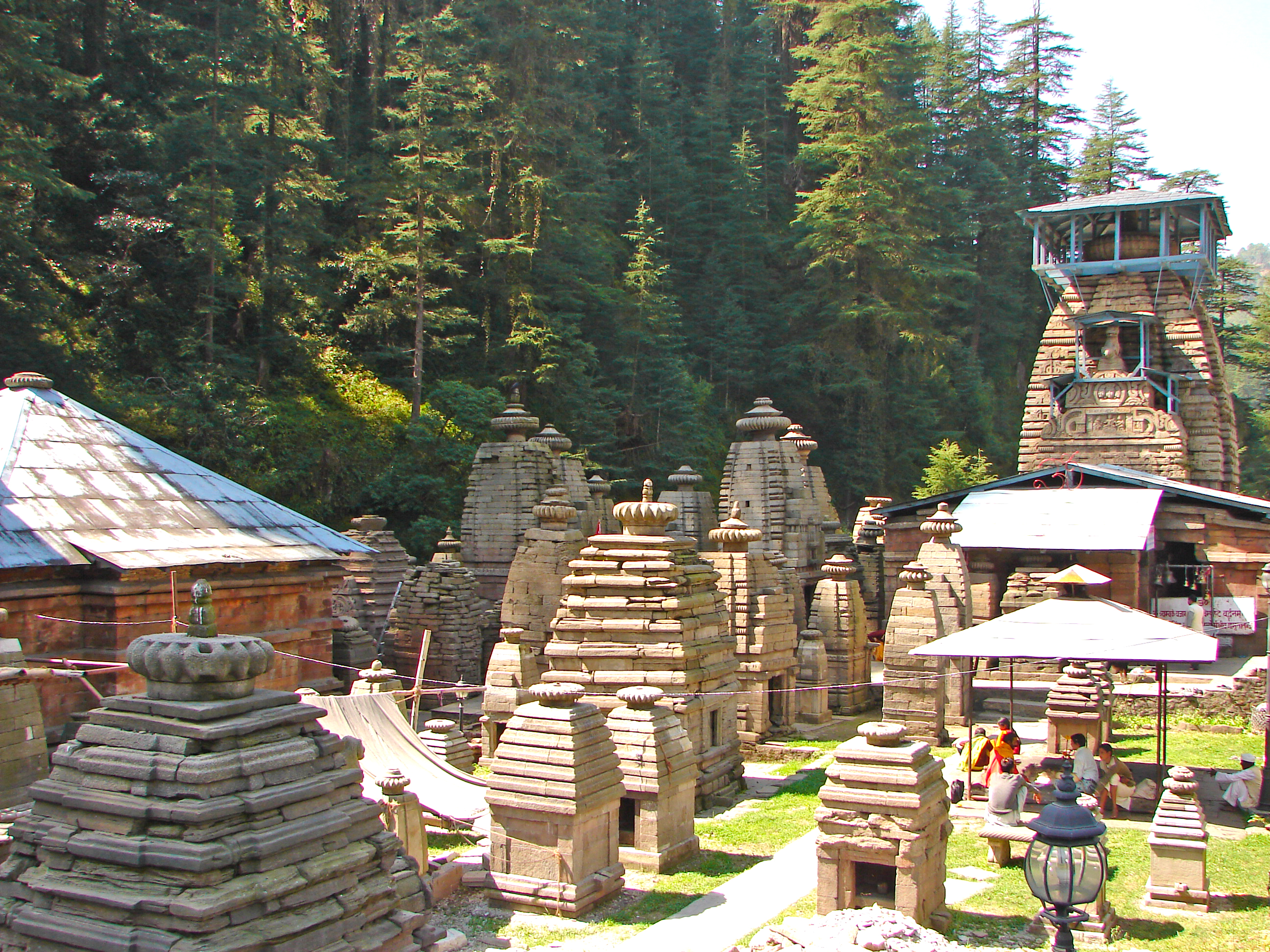
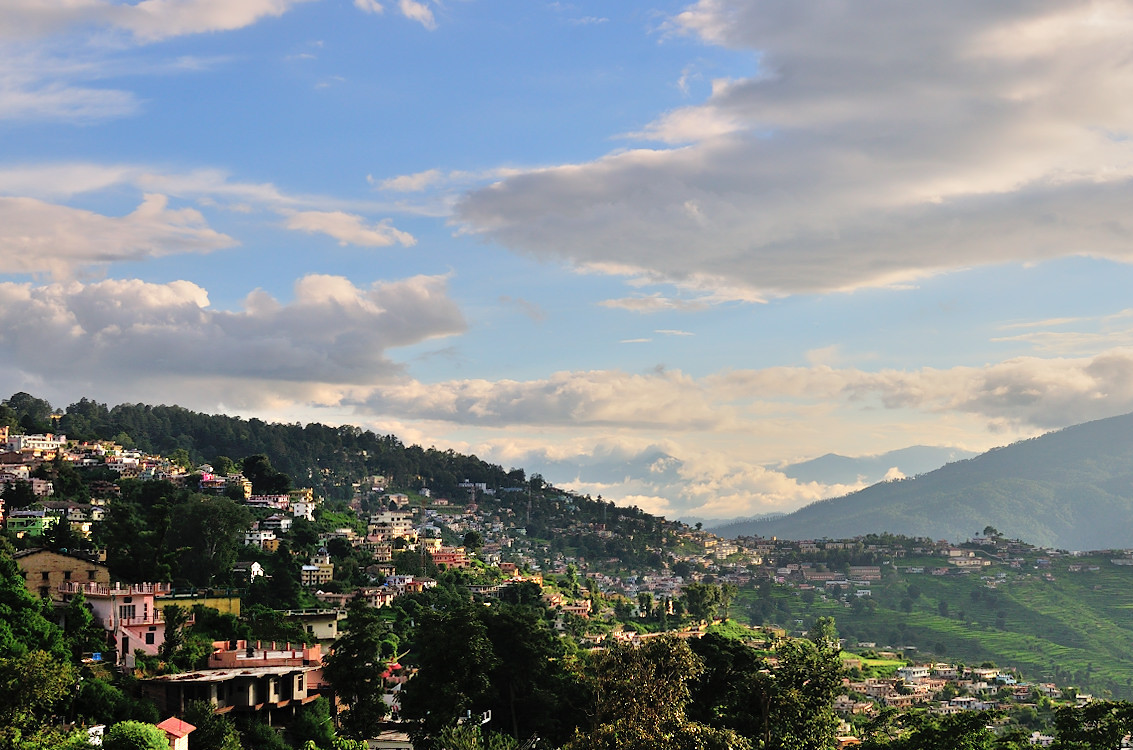
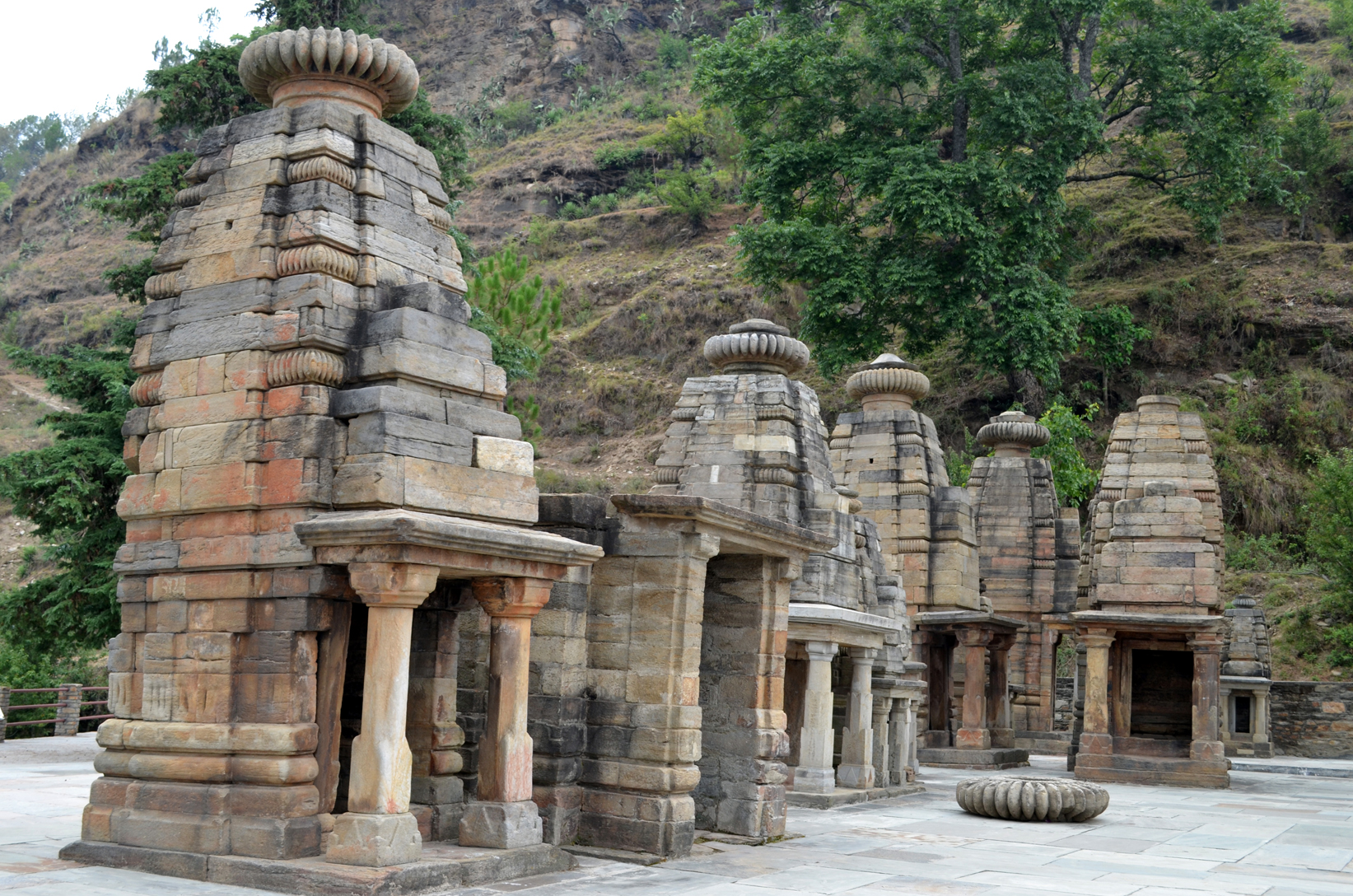
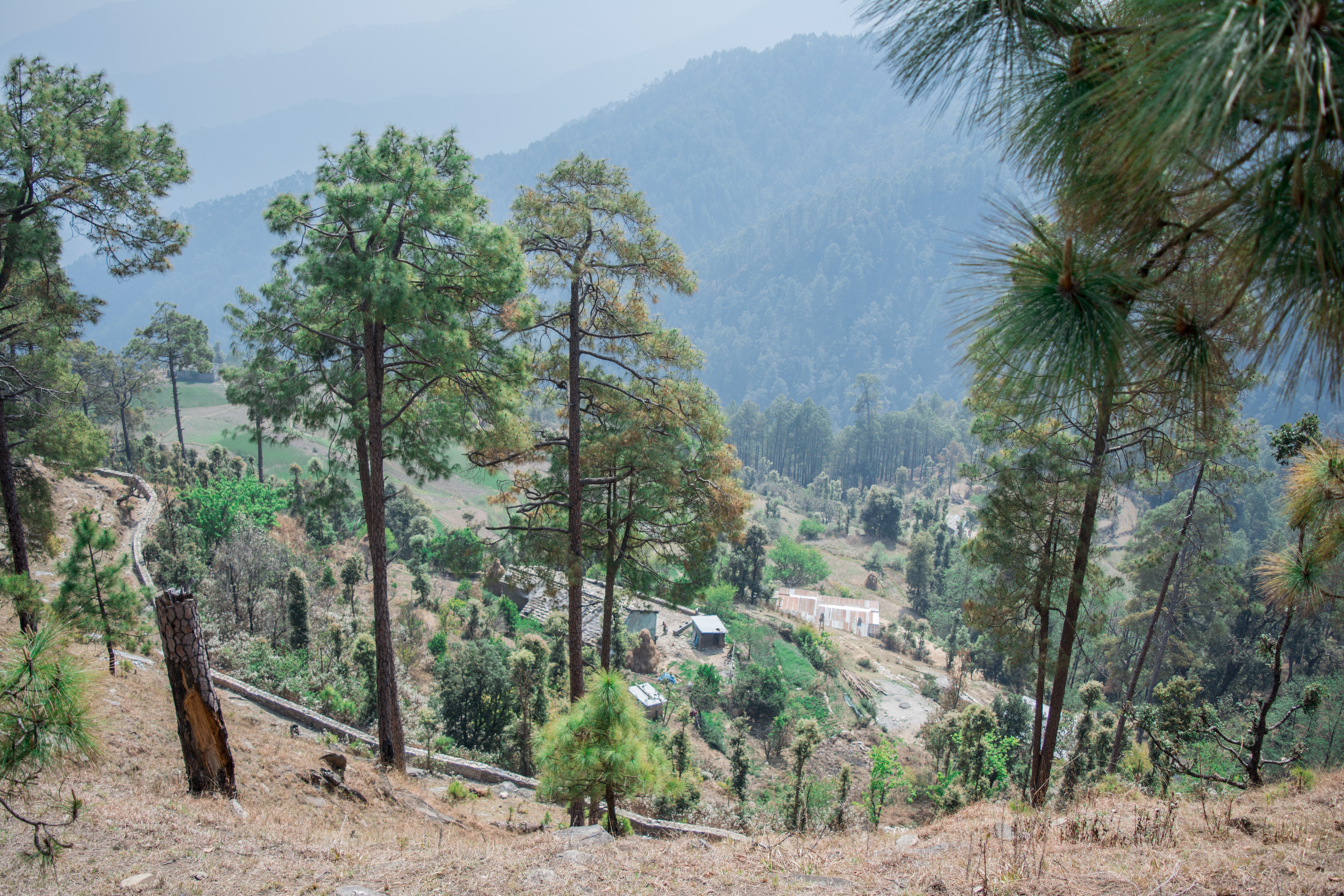
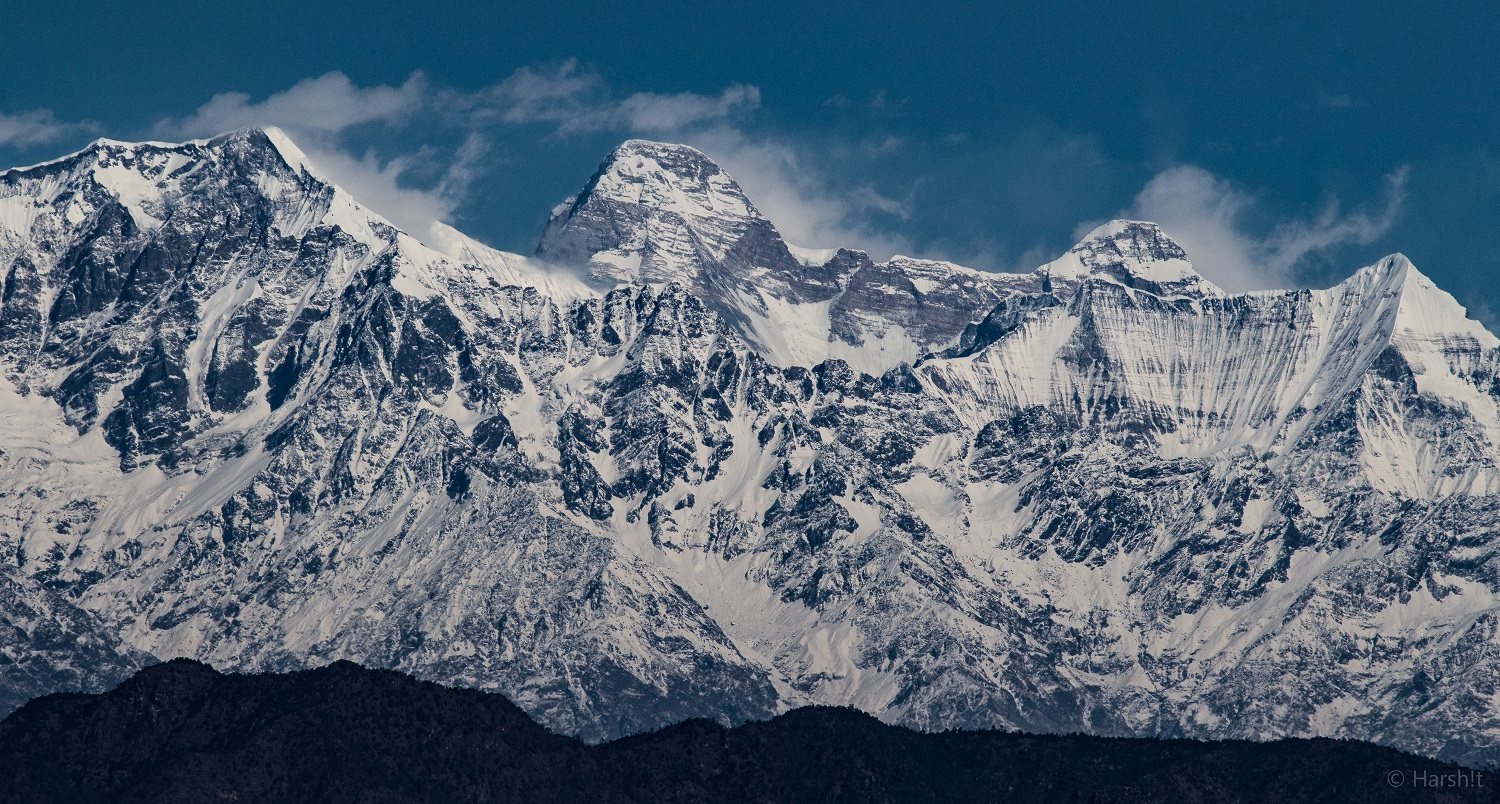
- Clockwise from top-left: Jageshwar, Almora town, Binsar Wildlife Sanctuary, Nanda Devi from Ranikhet, Surya temple Katarmal
- Interactive map of Almora district
- Coordinates: 29.59718°N 79.6570°E
- Country: India
- State: Uttarakhand
- Division: Kumaon
- Headquarters: Almora

Government
  - District collector: Anshul Singh IAS

Area
  - Total: 3,082 km^{2} (1,190 sq mi)
- Elevation: 1,646 m (5,400 ft)

Population (2011)
  - Total: 622,506
  - Density: 200/km^{2} (520/sq mi)

Language
  - Official: Hindi Sanskrit
  - Native: Kumoani
  - Sex ratio: 1139
- Time zone: UTC+5:30 (IST)
- PIN: 263601
- Telephone code: 91-5962
- Vehicle registration: UK 01
- Literacy: 80.47%
- Climate: Alpine (BSh) and Humid subtropical(Bsh) (Köppen)
- Website: almora.nic.in

Almora district is a district in the Kumaon Division of Uttarakhand state, India. The headquarters is at Almora. It is 1,638 meters above sea level. The neighbouring regions are Pithoragarh district to the east, Chamoli district to the west, Bageshwar district to the north and Nainital district to the south.

== History ==
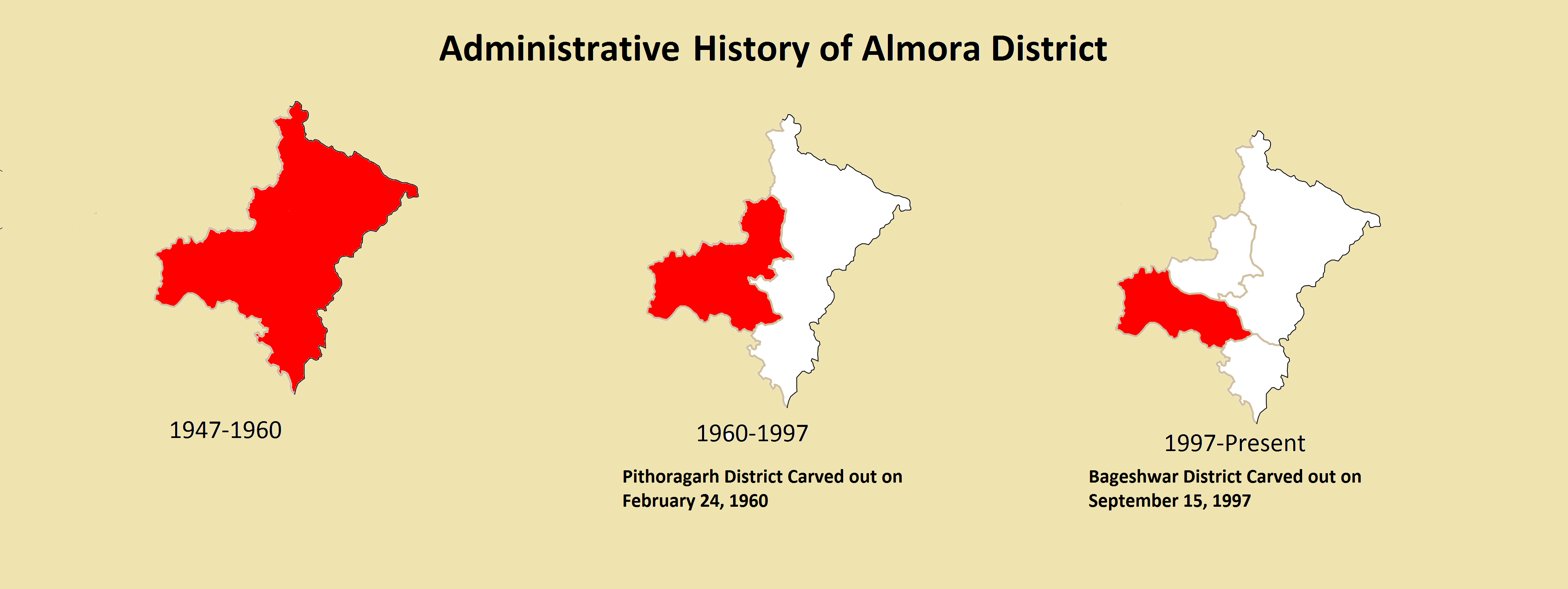
Administrative History of Almora District

The ancient town of Almora was the capital of the Kumaon Kingdom, before its establishment, it was under the possession of Katyuri king Baichaldeo. Later on when the Chand dynasty was founded in Champawat, the town of Almora was founded at this centrally located place in 1568 by Kalyan Chand. Later Chand kings shifted the capital of the Kumaon Kingdom from Champawat to Almora.

Almora town was the administrative headquarters of the Kumaun district; which was formed in 1815 following the defeat of Gorkha army in the Anglo-Gorkha war and the 1816 Treaty of Sugauli.

Historically, a major administrative division of the Almora district was the Chaugarkha pargana. The name Chaugarkha translates to "four pattis," referring to its original subdivisions: Salam, Lakhanpur, Darun, and Rangor (though by the early 20th century, it had expanded to nine pattis). According to the 1911 Almora Gazetteer, Chaugarkha had a population of 41,441 across 636 villages in 1901. The region was historically characterized by a high number of absentee Brahman landlords (primarily of the Joshi, Pant, and Pande communities) who held superior proprietary rights and collected high malikana dues from their khaikar (peasant) tenants. The pargana was also historically significant for its religious sites; the Darun patti is home to the ancient Jageshwar and Dindeswar temples, which were supported by gunth (tax-free land endowments) in the surrounding villages.

The Kumaun district then consisted of the complete Kumaon Division excluding the Terai district with its headquarters at Kashipur. In 1837, Garhwal was made a separate district with its headquarters at Pauri. The Nainital district was carved out of the Kumaun District in 1891, and the Kumaon District was then renamed Almora District after its headquarter. In 1921 the population of the district was recorded as 530,338.

In the 1960s Bageshwar district, Pithoragarh district and Champawat district had not yet been formed and were part of Almora district. Pithoragarh district was carved out of Almora on 24 February 1960 and Bageshwar district on 15 September 1997. In 2011, Ranikhet District was proposed to be carved out of the Almora District and has yet to come into existence.

== Geography ==
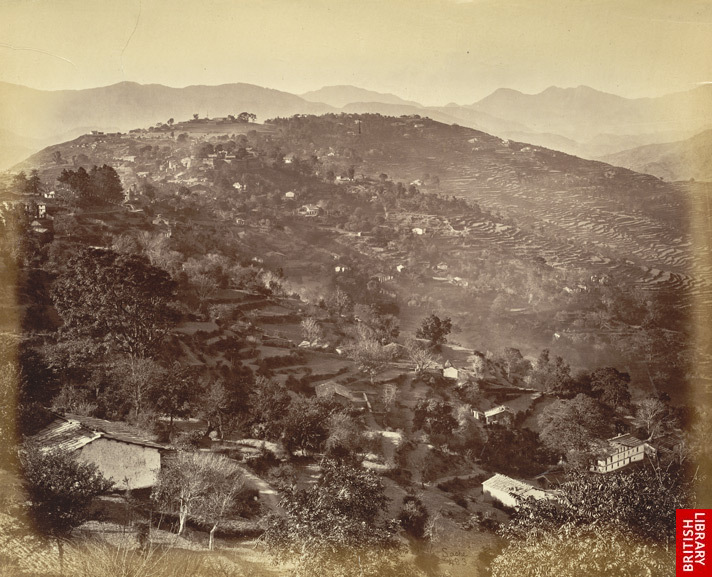
Almora ridge, 1860s

The town of Almora is situated over a horse saddle-shaped ridge of a mountain. The eastern portion of the ridge is known as Talifat and the western one is known as Selifat. The market is at the top of the ridge where these two, Talifat and Selifat jointly terminate.

The market is 1.25 miles (2.01 km) long and is covered with stone slabs. The place of the present cantonment was formerly known as Lalmandi. Presently where the collectorate exists, the 'Malla Mahal' (Upper Court) of Chanda kings was located. The site of present District Hospital used to be 'Talla Mahal' (Lower Court) of Chand rulers.

The central geography of the historical Chaugarkha region of Almora is dominated by the Binsar hill, which reaches an elevation of nearly 8,000 feet, and the Jageshwar peaks at 7,700 feet. A notable geographical feature in this area is a continental water divide located near Saimdeo. Springs rising in this central node flow in opposite directions, separating the basin of the Ganges from that of the Sarda (Kali) river; the waters from these respective springs do not meet again for hundreds of miles until the rivers converge in the plains.

Simalkhet is a village situated on the border of Almora and Chamoli. People of this village can speak both Kumauni and Garhwali languages. On the top of a hill there is a temple called Bhairav Gadi.

There is also a village known as Shitlakhet that sits in the south quadrant. This village is a hill station.

Gori River flows through Almora District.

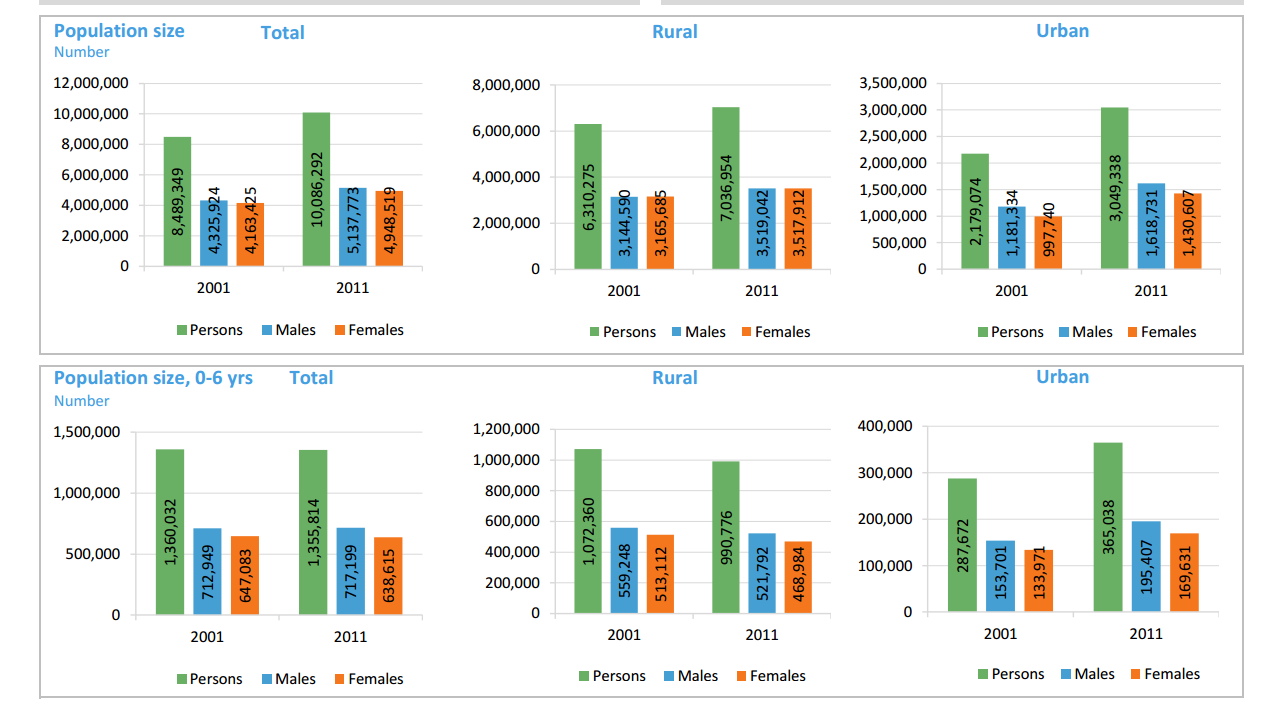
Source: censusindia.gov.in

== Visitor attractions ==
- Chitai Temple, 10 kilometres (6.2 mi) from the main city of Almora, is dedicated to the Hindu deity Golu Devata, the god of justice, popular in Kumaon region. An incarnation of the Lord Shiva, he is traditionally thought to fulfill wishes if prayed to with a clear conscience.
- Nanda Devi Temple is a Hindu temple to the Goddess Nanda Devi in the center of the town, with unusual image carving on the temple walls. Nanda Devi festival is held annually in September.
- Bright End Corner, 2 kilometres (1.2 mi) from the main city of Almora, is a beauty spot visited at sunrise and sunset. A circuit house, Swami Vivekanand Memorial and Vivekanand Library are also situated here.
- Binsar Mahadev Temple was built around the 9-10 century A.D. It is believed locally to have been built in a single day. Women come here on Vaikuntha Chaturdashi and light a lamp on their palm to fulfill the desire of child. Binsar Mahadev is 19 kilometres (12 mi) from Ranikhet, and is surrounded by thick forests at an altitude of 2,480 metres (8,140 ft). It is known for its archeological significance and its dense forest.
- Lal Bazaar is a shopping centre for local crafts, woolen garments, decorative items and metal utensils.
- Someshwar, 35 kilometres (22 mi) from Almora city is famous for its ancient Lord Shiva Temple, constructed by Raja Som Chand during the Chand Dynasty.
- Jageshwar is known for its Shiva temple within a dense forest. The temple complex has 124 shrines and hundreds of statues.

== Administrative subdivisions ==
District of Almora is divided into nine tehsils: Almora, Bhikiyasain, Bhanoli, Chaukhutiya, Dwarahat, Jainti, Ranikhet, Someshwar, Syalde and Sult.

Its Assembly constituencies are Dwarahat, Salt, Ranikhet, Someshwar (SC), Almora, and Jageshwar.

Upon the creation of Kumaon district in May 1815, seven tehsils were set up in the district at Almora, Kali Kumaun, Pali Pachaon, Kota, Shor, Phaldakot and Ramnagar. taking the total number of tehsils to nine.

Parganas of Kumaon district after re-organisation in 1823
Kumaun region	Garhwal region
Pali; Baramandal; Chaugarkha; PhaldaKot; Dhaniakot; Danpur; Gangoli; Kota Chakata; Katoli Marori; Johar Bhote; Darma; Kali Kumaun; Dhyanirow; Shor; Sera Askot	Baraseo; Dewalgarh; Choundkot; Nagpur; Ganga Salan; Chandpur; Pain Khande; Badhan; Talla Salan; Malla Salan; Dassoli

== Culture and literature ==
Almora was also the site of the dance academy set up by dancer Udai Shankar in 1938 – several well-known Indian and French dancers trained there. The Almora dance academy was housed in Pine Lodge on the outskirts of the town (Ranidhara). The site has views of the Himalayas and the city.

"In these hills, Nature’s hospitality eclipses all that man can ever do. The enchanting beauty of the Himalayas, their bracing climate and the soothing green that envelops you, leave nothing more to be desired. I wonder whether the scenery of these hills and the climate are to be surpassed, if equalled, by any of the beauty spots of the world. After having been for nearly three weeks in the Almora hills, I am more than ever amazed why our people need to go to Europe in search of health."

- Mahatma M.K. Gandhi

"These mountains are associated with the best memories of our race: Here, therefore, must be one of centers, not merely of activity, but more of calmness of meditation, and of peace and I hope some one to realize it."

- Swami Vivekananda (replying to the address given to him by the people of Almora)

== Transport ==
The Nearest airports to Almora are Pantnagar Airport (127 km) in Nainital and Naini Saini Airport (125 km) in Pithoragarh.

The nearest railway station is at Kathgodam, 90 km, from where direct trains are available for Delhi, Lucknow and Agra. Some of the major trains from Kathgodam are:

- Sampark Kranti Express (5035/506)
- Howrah Express (3019/3020)
- Ranikhet Express (5013/5014)
- Rampur Passenger (1/2 R.K. Passenger and 3/4 R.K. Passenger)
- Nainital Express (5308/5307)
- Garib Rath (weekly)

Almora is well connected by road to important centres in the region. NH 87 passes through to almora is known as karnaprayag national highway. Some distances:

- Delhi (378 km)
- Dehradun (394 km)
- Bageshwar (74 km), (92 km via Kausani)
- Nainital (63 km) (via Ranikhet 103 km)
- Kathgodam (86 km)
- Haldwani (91 km)
- Ramnagar (120 km), (via Nainital- 150 km)
- Rudrapur (130 km)
- Ranikhet (45 km)
- Dwarahat (68 km)
- Pithoragarh (120 km)
- Lucknow (454 km)
- Bareilly (191 km)
- chaukhutia (93 km)

== Demographics ==
Historical population
Year	Pop.	±% p.a.
1901	216,960	—
1911	251,423	+1.49%
1921	253,675	+0.09%
1931	279,009	+0.96%
1941	328,748	+1.65%
1951	369,697	+1.18%
1961	420,152	+1.29%
1971	483,876	+1.42%
1981	560,381	+1.48%
1991	610,453	+0.86%
2001	632,866	+0.36%
2011	622,506	−0.16%

According to the 2011 census Almora district has a population of 622,506, roughly equal to the nation of Montenegro or the US state of Vermont. This gives it a ranking of 517th in India (out of a total of 640). The district has a population density of 198 inhabitants per square kilometre (510/sq mi). Its population growth rate over the decade 2001-2011 was −1.73%. Almora has a sex ratio of 1139 females for every 1000 males, and a literacy rate of 81.06%. Scheduled Castes and Scheduled Tribes make up 22.68% and 0.21% of the population respectively.

Religions in Almora district (2011)
Religion	Percent
Hinduism	98.19%
Islam	1.25%
Other or not stated	0.56%
Distribution of religions

In 2001, Hindus were 621,203, Muslims 7,283 (1.15%), Christians 959. Most of the population lives near the main market of Almora that forms nearly 45% of the population.

Languages of Almora district (2011)
1. Kumaoni (90.2%)
2. Hindi (5.33%)
3. Garhwali (2.88%)
4. Others (1.57%)

The major first language of the district is Kumaoni, spoken by over 90% of the population.

Almora district: mother-tongue of population, according to the 2011 Indian Census.
Mother tongue code	Mother tongue	People	Percentage
002007	Bengali	555	0.1%
004001	Dogri	737	0.1%
006102	Bhojpuri	885	0.1%
006195	Garhwali	17,939	2.9%
006240	Hindi	33,198	5.3%
006340	Kumauni	561,642	90.2%
014011	Nepali	2,604	0.4%
016038	Punjabi	536	0.1%
022015	Urdu	1,408	0.2%
–	Others	3,002	0.5%
Total		622,506	100.0%

== Notable people ==
- MS Dhoni, cricketer and captain of the Indian Cricket Team.
- Manohar Shyam Joshi (1933–2006), writer; born in Almora.
- Sumitranandan Pant, writer; born in Almora.
- B. D. Pande Former Cabinet Secretary of India and Governor of West Bengal, Punjab is a resident of Almora
- Prasoon Joshi, writer, lyricist`
- Murli Manohar Joshi (Former Human Resource Development Minister of India)
- Govind Ballabh Pant (First chief minister of U.P)
- Ekta Bisht: Indian national cricket team member
- Naima Khan Upreti (1938–2018) was an Indian theatre actor, singer and producer at Doordarshan.

== Villages ==
- Bhagoti
- Daulaghat
