= Chandola =

Brahmin family name in India

Chandola is a Brahmin surname of Garhwali and Kumaoni origin mostly used in the Indian state of Uttarakhand.

== Chandolas in a Kumaon Bhramin Region Highest Caste in Hindu Brahmins ==
Chandolas in Kumaon region live in several villages in Bageshwar district. Their major villages are Pokhri at Kanda near Vijaypur and Kafligair. Their ist devata is Dhauli Nag, the main temple being 1 km from Vijaypur. A yearly mela/bhandara is organized in the temple premises. Badri Datt Pandey mentions that some of them are probably descendants of Mishra Brahmins, who came from Garhwal and settled in Kumaon during the reign of Rudra Chand (1568–1597).

== Chandolas in the Garhwal Region ==
In the Garhwal region, Chandolas reside in the districts of Pauri Garhwal, Chamoli Garhwal, and Dehradun. Their revered kul devi, Jwalpa Devi, is enshrined in a temple 34 kilometers from Pauri on the Pauri-Kotdwara road.

== Notable people with surname Chandola ==
People with surname Chandola who may or may not belong to the specific Brahmin caste.

- Anoop Chandola - American linguist and anthropologist
- Jyotsna Chandola - Indian actress
- Harish Chandola (1929-2023) - Indian journalist

== See also ==
- Garhwali people
- Kumauni people
- Chandola Lake
