= Sani Udiyar =

- Village
- Location in Uttarakhand, India Sani Udiyar (India)
- Coordinates: 29.77115°N 79.87059°E
- Country: India
- State: Uttarakhand
- Division: Kumaon
- District: Bageshwar

Area
  - Total: 216.48 km^{2} (83.58 sq mi)
- Elevation: 520 m (1,710 ft)

Population (2011)
  - Total: 394
  - Density: 1.82/km^{2} (4.71/sq mi)
- Sex ratio 1021/1000 ♂/♀

Languages
  - Official: Hindi; Sanskrit
  - Spoken: Kumaoni
- Time zone: UTC+5:30 (IST)
- PIN: 263631
- Telephone code: 05963
- Vehicle registration: UK 02
- Website: uk.gov.in

Sani Udiyar is a village situated in Kanda Tehsil in Bageshwar district in the State of Uttarakhand, India. It is located at a distance of 15 kilometres (9.3 mi) from Kanda and 36 kilometres (22 mi) from Bageshwar. Sani Udiyar is a medium-sized village with total 88 families residing. It has substantial population of people belonging to Schedule Caste.

== Geography ==
Sani Udiyar is located at 29.77115°N 79.87059°E in Bageshwar district of Uttarakhand, India at a distance of 36 kilometres (22 mi) from Bageshwar city, the administrative Headquarter of Bageshwar District. It has an average elevation of 520 metres (1,710 ft) above mean Sea Level. Sani Udiyar village has a total geographical area of 216.48 hectares.

== Demographics ==
Total population of Sani Udiyar village is 394 as per 2011 Census of India. Schedule Caste constitutes 34.52% of total population. Sex ratio of Sani Udiyar is 1021 which is higher than the state average of 963. Number of children with age 0-6 is 66 which makes up 16.75% of the total population of village. Sani Udiyar village has higher literacy rate when compared to Uttarakhand. In 2011, literacy rate of Sani Udiyar village was 89.33%, while, that of Uttarakhand as 78.82%. Out of total population, 177 were engaged in work activities. 16.38% of workers describe their work as Main Work (Employment or Earning more than 6 Months) while 83.62% were involved in Marginal activity providing livelihood for less than 6 months.

== Transport ==
Sani Udiyar is well connected by motorable roads with major destinations of Uttarakhand state and northern India. Bus Services are provided by Uttarakhand Transport Corporation and K.M.O.U. Sani Udiyar is connected to Delhi by a daily bus service to Anand Vihar. Regular Taxis are also available to Kanda and then further up to Bageshwar and Chaukori. Pantnagar Airport, located in Pantnagar is the primary Airport serving entire Kumaon Region. Indira Gandhi International Airport, located in Delhi is the nearest international Airport. Kathgodam railway station is the nearest railway station.

== Education ==
Schools in Sani Udiyar are run by the state government or private organisations. Hindi and English are the primary languages of instruction. Schools in Sani Udiyar follow the "10+2+3" plan. After completing their secondary education, students typically enroll in Inter Colleges that have a higher secondary facility and are affiliated with the ICSE, the CBSE or the Department of Education of the Government of Uttarakhand. They usually choose a focus on liberal arts, business, or science. Government Inter College, Saniudiyar was established in 1948.

== See also ==
- Bageshwar district
- Kumaon Division
- Uttarakhand
