= Mankot =

- Village
- Location in Uttarakhand, India Mankot (India)
- Coordinates: 29.8282°N 79.8190°E
- Country: India
- State: Uttarakhand
- Division: Kumaon
- District: Bageshwar
- Elevation: 1,520 m (4,990 ft)

Population (2011)
  - Total: 483
- Sex ratio 1100/1000 ♂/♀

Languages
  - Official: Hindi; Sanskrit
  - Spoken: Kumaoni
- Time zone: UTC+5:30 (IST)
- Bo Bageshwar: 263642
- Telephone code: 05963
- Vehicle registration: UK 02
- Website: uk.gov.in

Mankot is a Village situated in Bageshwar district in the State of Uttarakhand, India. It is located at a distance of 13.5 kilometres (8.4 mi) from Bageshwar on the National Highway 309A. Mankot is a medium-sized village with total 118 families residing.

== History ==
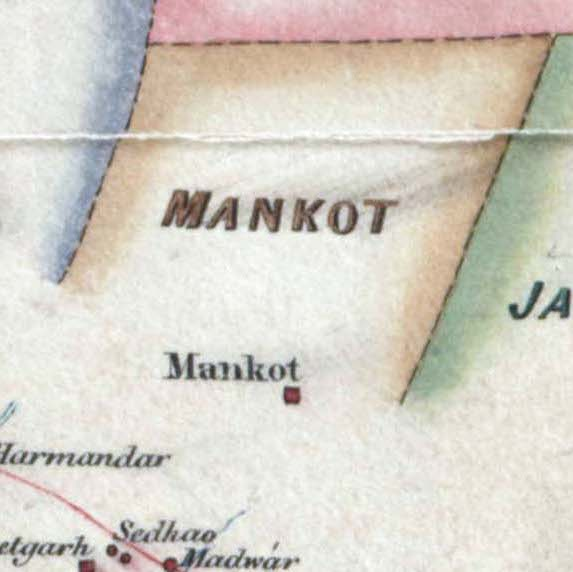
Detail of the territory of Mankot from a map of the various Hill States of the Punjab Hills region, copied in 1852. Parts of its borders has not been fully demarcated on the map.

Mankot was the seat of Mankoti kings who ruled the area around 13th century. The kingdom extended between the rivers Saryuganga and Ramganga; and was called Gangavali; which got corrupted to Gangoli over the course of time. The kingdom of Gangoli was invaded by the Chand king, Balo Kalyan Chand, in the 16th century. Following its defeat, Mankot was merged into the Kumaon Kingdom. In Janhavi naula at Gangolihat belonging to 1264 A.D. there is a piece of stone with the names of the Gangoli kings and also records an inscription about a possible invasion of Mankot by the Delhi Sultan Nasiruddin Mahmud Shah. On the piece of stone of 1352, found in the temple of Baijnath, is written that the kings of Gangoli (Hamirdeo, Lingarajdeo, Dharaldeo) built the kalash of the temple.

== Geography ==
Mankot is located at 29.8359°N 79.8227°E in Bageshwar district of Uttarakhand, India at a distance of 18 kilometres (11 mi) from Bageshwar city, the administrative Headquarter of Bageshwar District. It has an average elevation of 1,520 metres (4,990 ft) above mean Sea Level. Mankot village has a total geographical area of 136.49 hectares.

== Demographics ==
The Mankot village has population of 483 of which 230 are males while 253 are females as per Population Census 2011. In Mankot village population of children with age 0-6 is 56 which makes up 11.59% of total population of village. Average Sex Ratio of Mankot village is 1100 which is higher than Uttarakhand state average of 963. Mankot village has higher literacy rate compared to Uttarakhand. In 2011, literacy rate of Mankot village was 84.31 % compared to 78.82% of Uttarakhand. In Mankot Male literacy stands at 96.08% while female literacy rate was 73.54%. In Mankot village out of total population, 360 were engaged in work activities. 59.72% of workers describe their work as Main Work (Employment or Earning more than 6 Months) while 40.28% were involved in Marginal activity providing livelihood for less than 6 months.

== Transport ==
Mankot is well connected by motorable roads with major destinations of Uttarakhand state and northern India. Bus Services are provided by Uttarakhand Transport Corporation and K.M.O.U. Regular Taxis are also available to Bageshwar and Chaukori. Pantnagar Airport, located in Pantnagar is the primary Airport serving entire Kumaon Region. Indira Gandhi International Airport, located in Delhi is the nearest international Airport. Kathgodam railway station is the nearest railway station.

== Education ==
Schools in Mankot are run by the state government or private organisations. Hindi and English are the primary languages of instruction. Schools in Mankot follow the "10+2+3" plan. After completing their secondary education, students typically enroll in Inter Colleges that have a higher secondary facility and are affiliated with the ICSE, the CBSE or the Department of Education of the Government of Uttarakhand. They usually choose a focus on liberal arts, business, or science.

== See also ==
- Bageshwar district
- Kumaon Division
- Uttarakhand
