= Vijaypur, Uttarakhand =

Vijaypur Bijaypur
- Hill Station
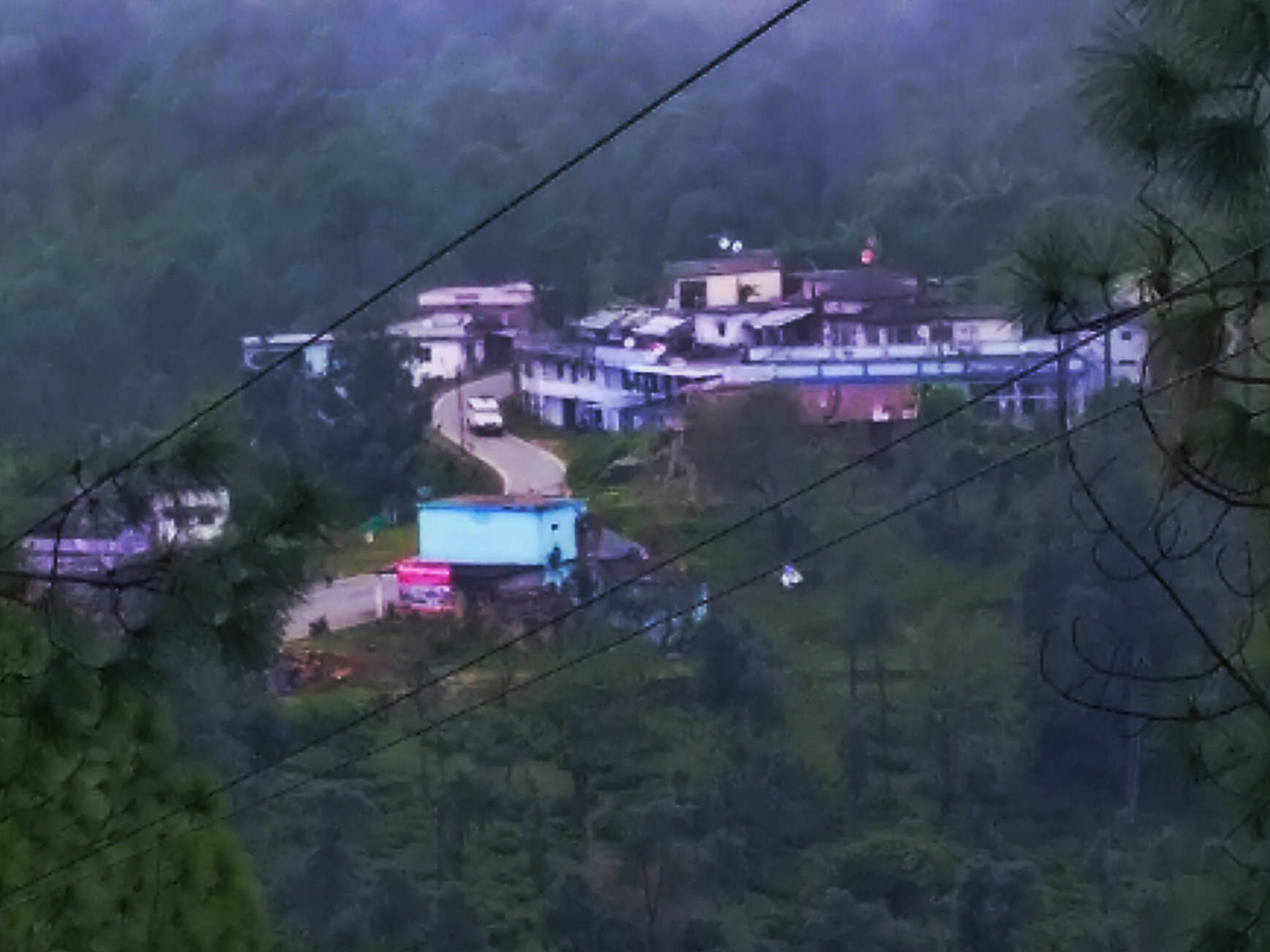

- Location in Uttarakhand, India Vijaypur (India)
- Coordinates: 29.84°N 79.92°E
- Country: India
- State: Uttarakhand
- District: Bageshwar
- Named for: Vijay Lal Shah

Area
  - Total: 1 km^{2} (0.39 sq mi)
- Elevation: 2,050 m (6,730 ft)

Population (2011)
  - Total: 89
  - Density: 89/km^{2} (230/sq mi)

Languages
  - Official: Hindi; Sanskrit
  - Spoken: Kumaoni
- Time zone: UTC+5:30 (IST)
- PIN: 263640
- Telephone code: 059628
- Vehicle registration: UK 02
- Website: uk.gov.in

Vijaypur, officially known as Bijaypur is a hill station and village situated in Bageshwar district in the state of Uttarakhand, India. It is located at a distance of 30 km from Bageshwar and 5 km from Kanda; amidst dense Pine Forests on the Bageshwar-Chaukori Highway.

It is situated at an altitude of 2050m, and is known for its panoramic views of snow-capped Himalayan peaks like Trisul, Nanda Devi and Nanda Kot. The Dhaulinag Temple, situated in Vijaypur is among the 8 prominent Nag temples of Kumaon, the others being Berinag, Kalinag, Feninag, Karkotaknag, Pinglenag, Kharharinag and Athgulinag.

== Places of interest ==
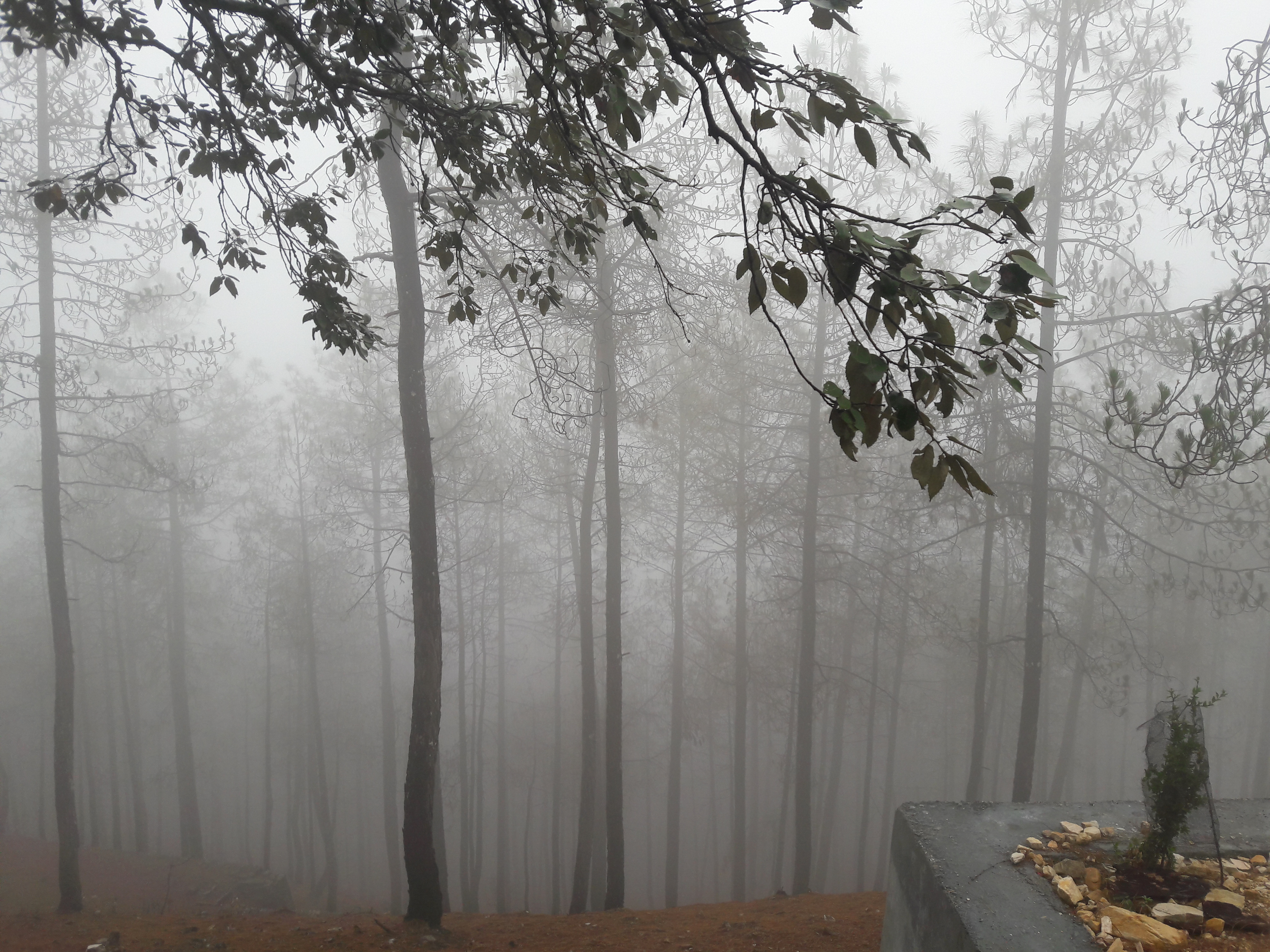
Pine forests around Dhaulinag Temple

=== Dhaulinag Temple ===
Dhaulinag temple is situated at the top of the Vijaypur Mountain. The temple is located at walking distance from Vijaypur, and is visited by devotees mainly during Navratri. Panchmi Mela is a very famous festival celebrated over here.

=== Tea gardens ===
The tea estate at Vijaypur was set up by the British in the twentieth century. Much later, the estate was acquired by Vijay Lal Sah, a Kumaoni trader, who renamed the town after himself.

== Transport ==
Vijaypur is located on NH 309A at a distance of 30 km from Bageshwar and 5 km from Kanda. Share-Taxis are available from Vijaypur towards the nearby towns of Kanda, Kotmunya and Udiyari bend. Buses run by Uttarakhand Transport Corporation and K.M.O.U. connect it to cities of Bageshwar, Almora, Berinag and Delhi. It lies on the route of Kailash Mansarovar.

== Gallery ==
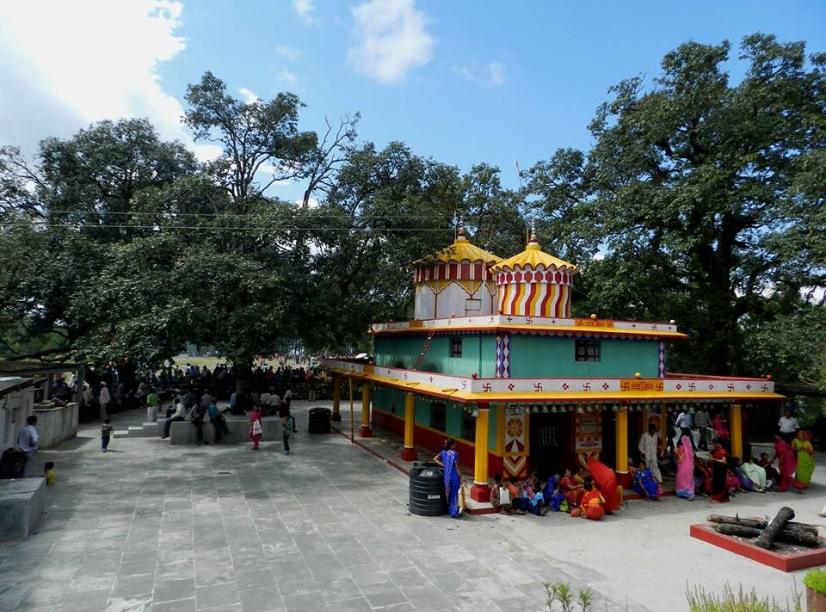
Dhaulinag Temple

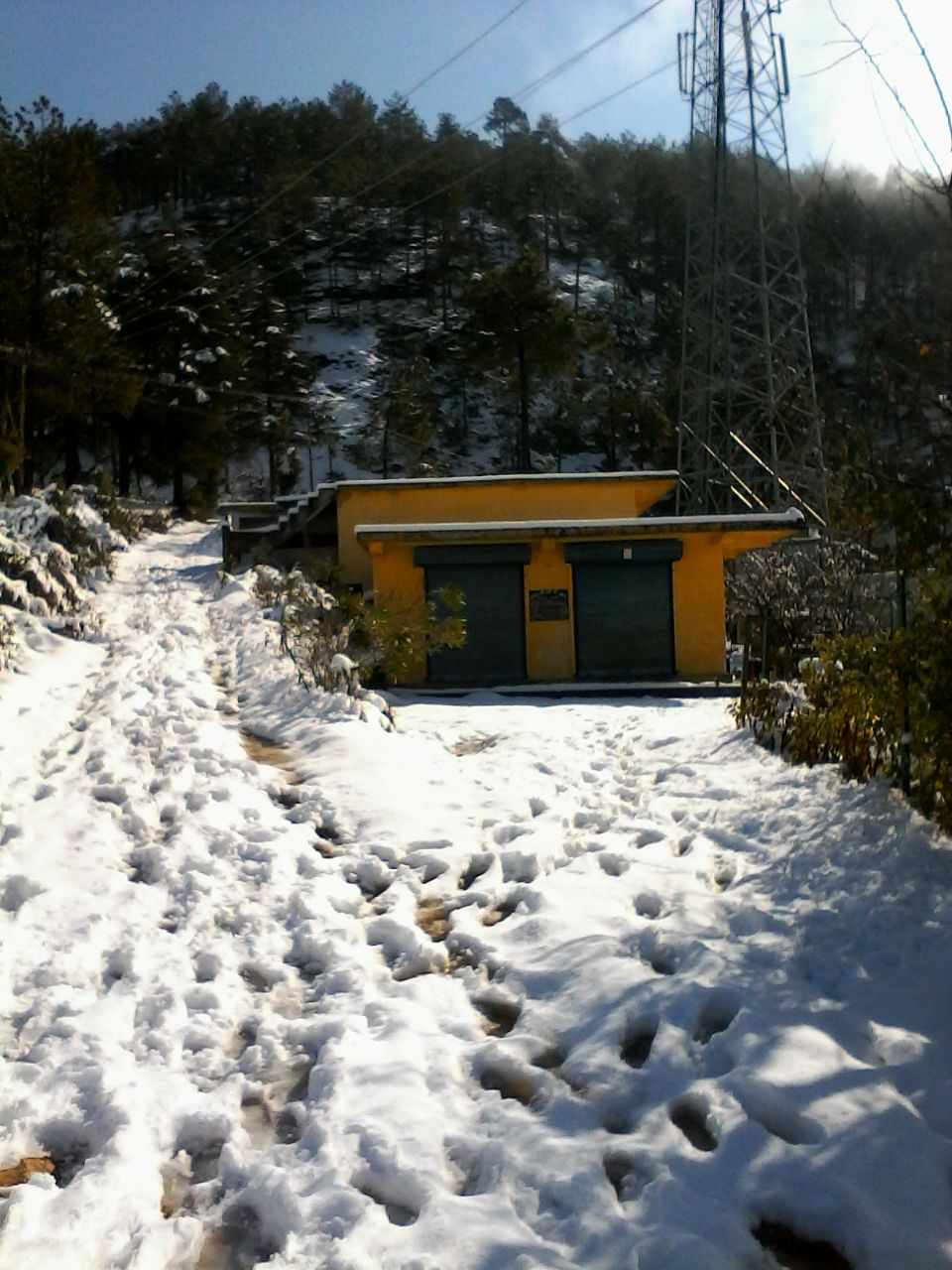
Vijaypur after Snowfall

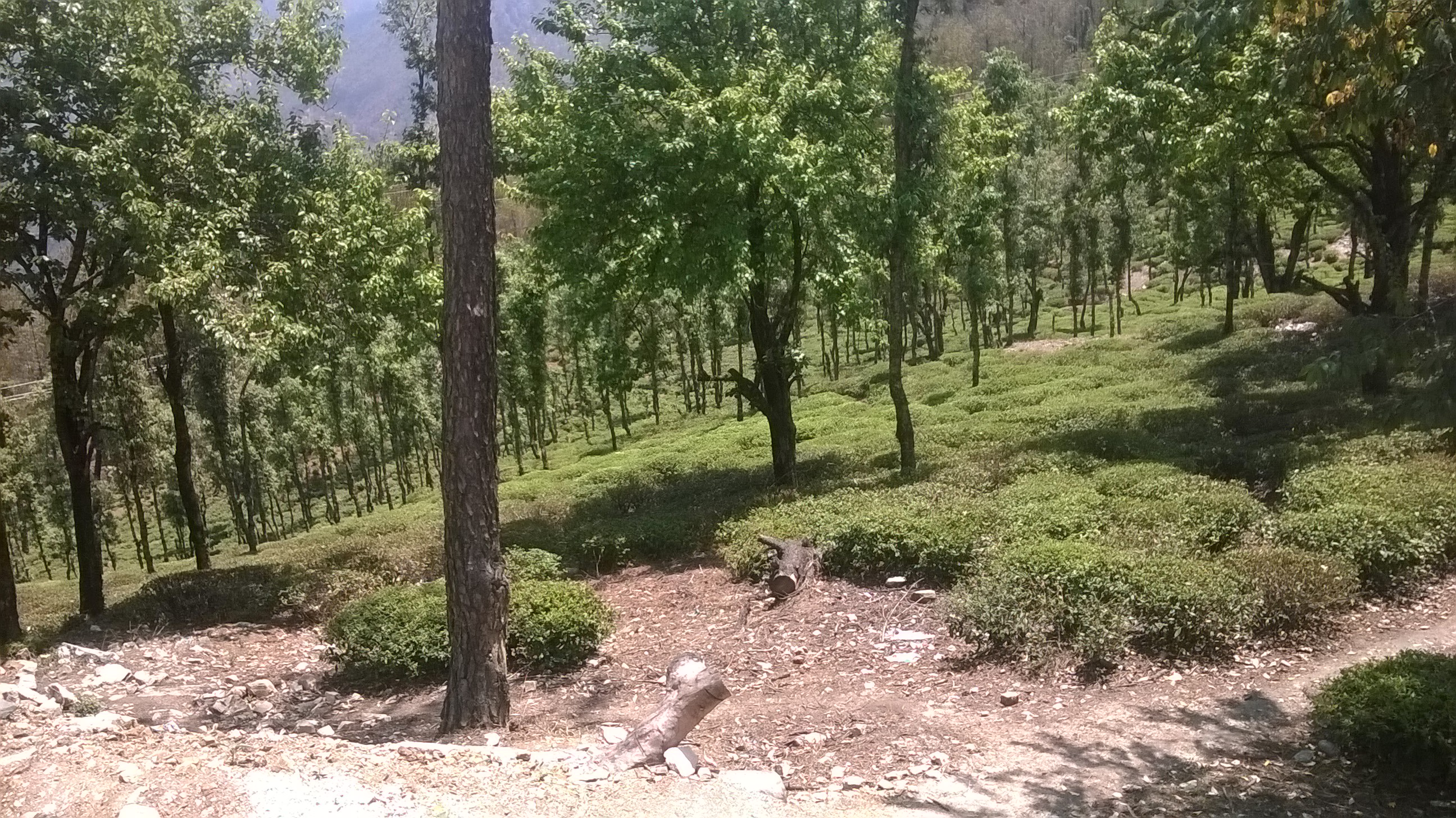
Tea Gardens, Vijaypur

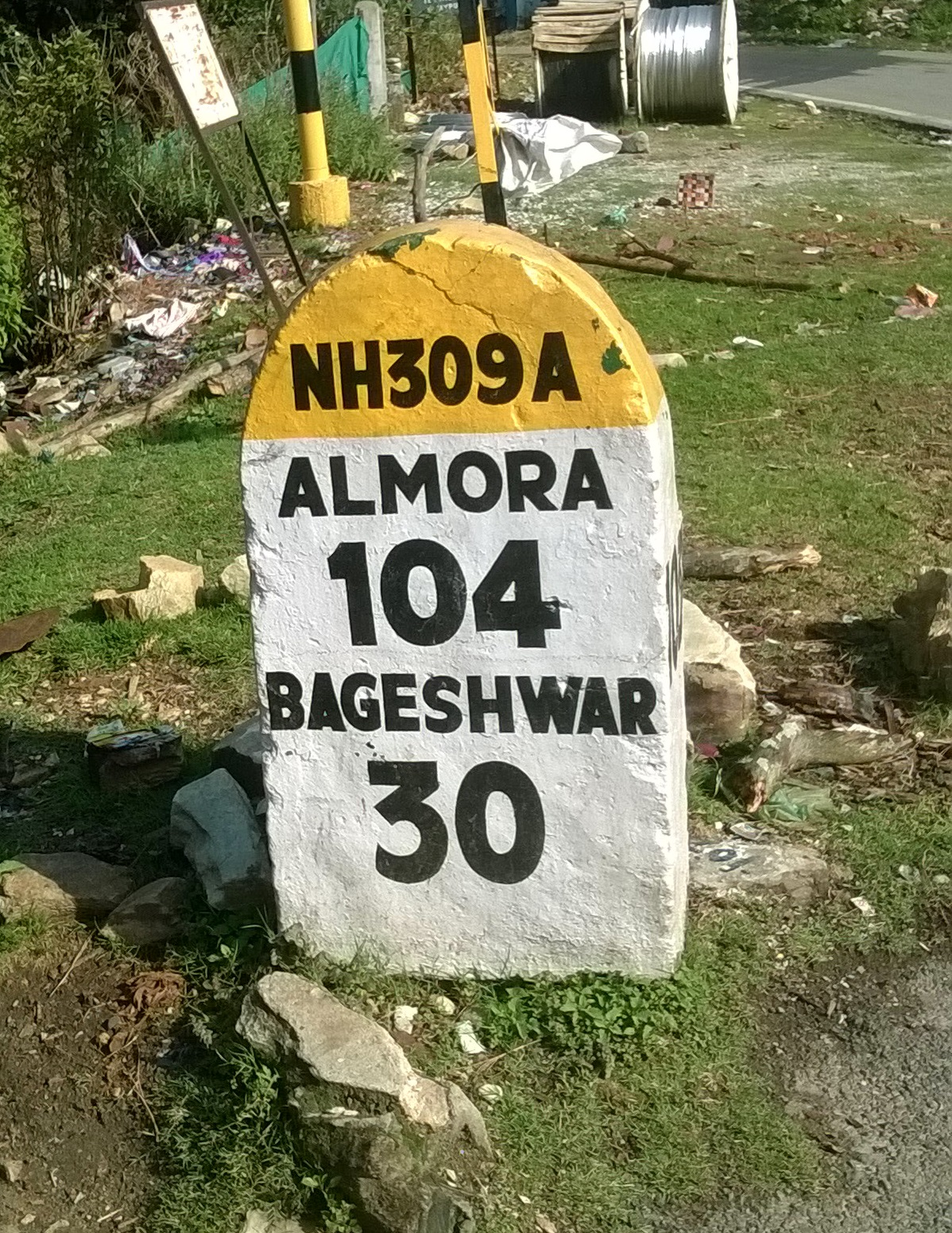
Milestone on NH 309A at Vijaypur

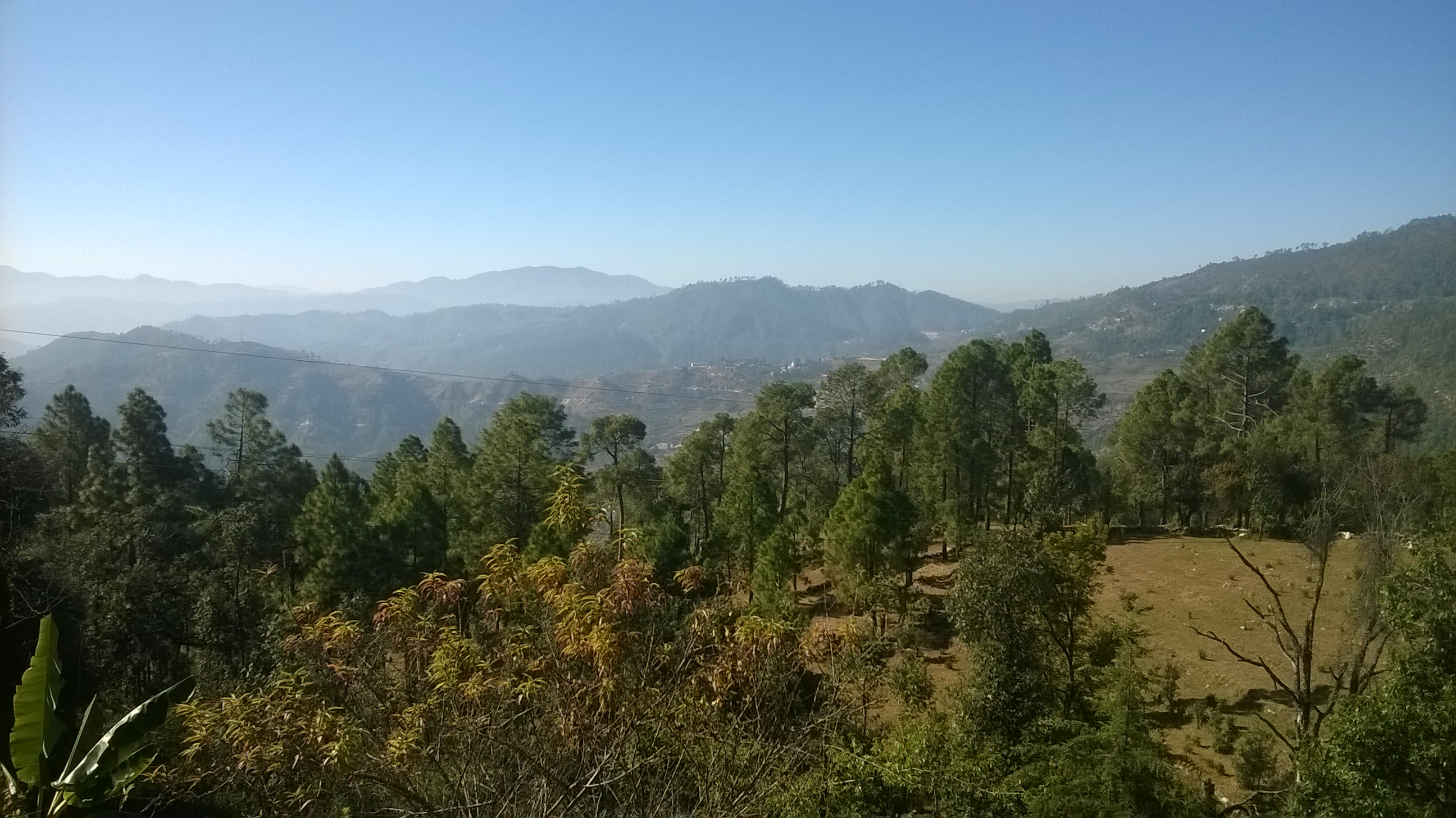
View from Vijaypur

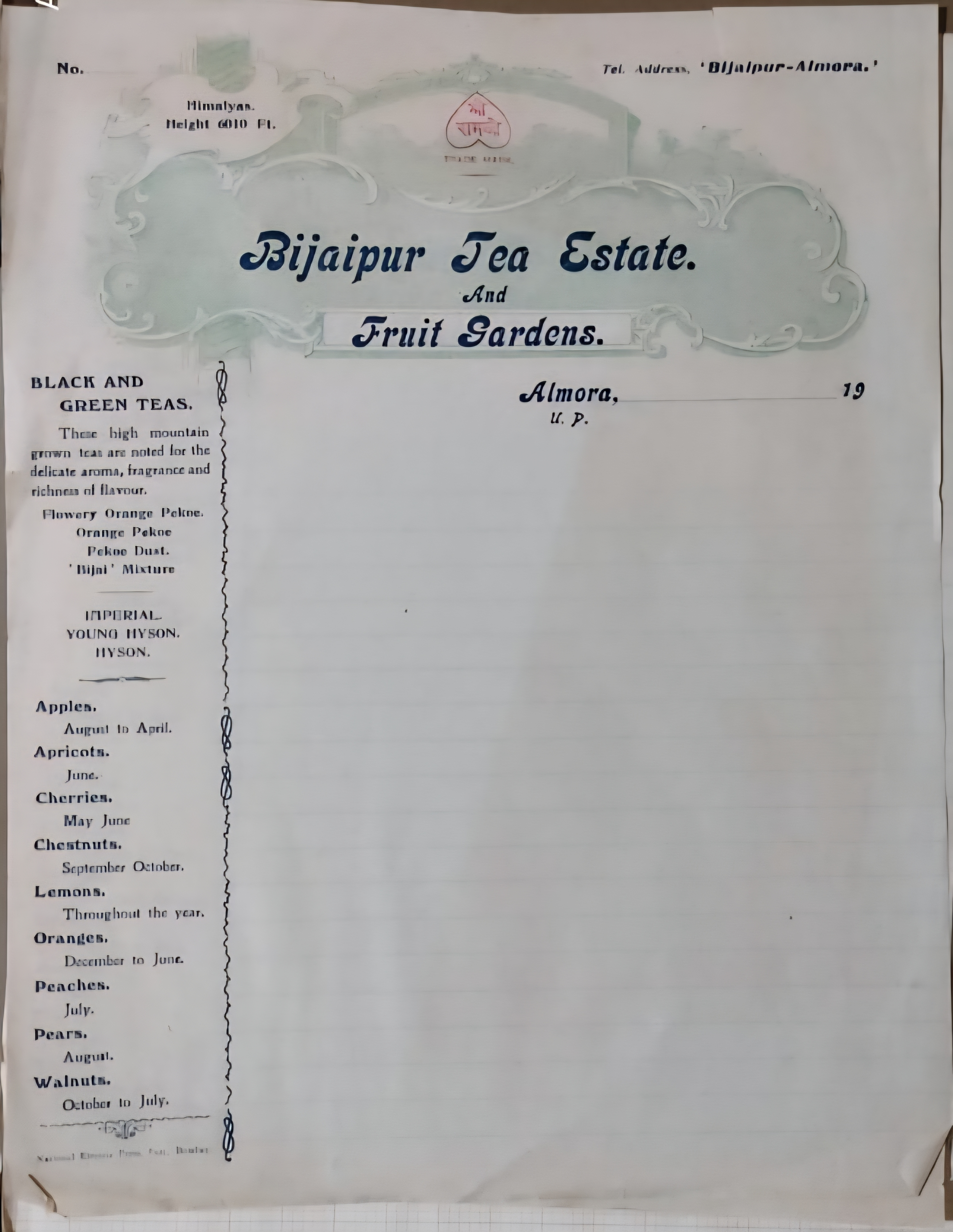
Official letterhead of the Bijaipur Tea Estate and Fruit Gardens

== See also ==
- Kanda
- Bageshwar district
- Uttarakhand
