= Simalkot =

SimalKot Simal Kote
- Village
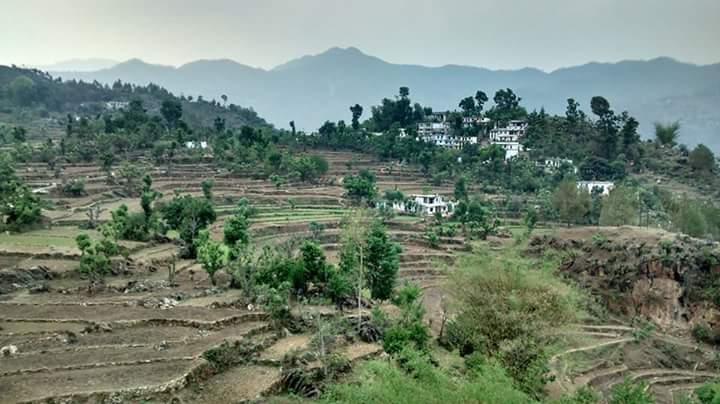
- Simalkot is a small village in Uttarakhand
- Interactive map of SimalKot
- Coordinates: 29.6498938°N 80.0597789°E
- Country: India
- State: Uttarakhand
- District: Pithoragarh
- Tehsil: Gangolihat
- Elevation: 520 m (1,710 ft)

Population (2001)
  - Total: 275
- Time zone: UTC+05:30 (IST)

Simalkot is a small village located in the Gangolihat tehsil of Pithoragarh district, Uttarakhand, India.

== Demographics ==
- No. of households : 56
- Total population : 275
- Population- Male : 129
- Population- Female : 146
- Sex ratio : 1132 (females per 1000 males)
- Literacy rate : 99.9%
- Male Literacy rate : 99.9%
- Female Literacy rate : 99.9%
- Photo Source: Census of India 2001

== Gallery ==
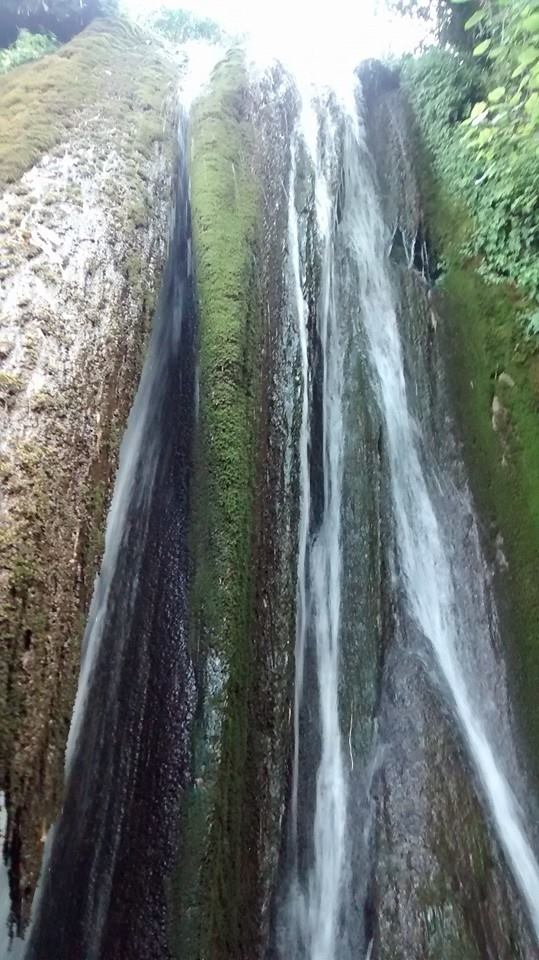
View of waterfall

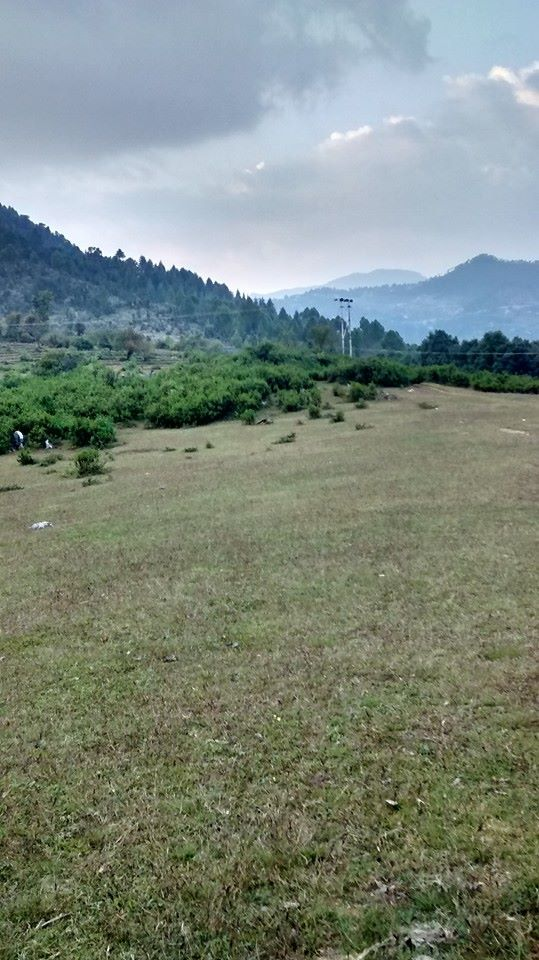
Land donated by villagers to government for college

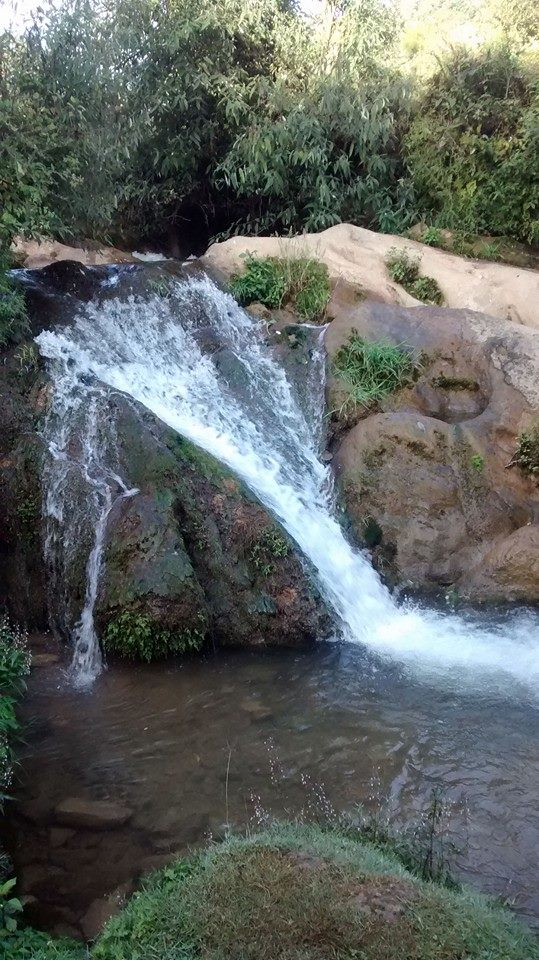
Water source for cultivation
