= National Highway 309A (India) =

National highway in India

National Highway 309A
- Map of the National Highway in red

Route information
- Length: 126 km (78 mi)

Major junctions
- East end: Almora
- List: NH 309B in Almora; Uttarakhand SH 3 in Almora; NH109K in Bageshwar; Uttarakhand SH 60 in Kotmanya; Uttarakhand SH 11 in Chaukori; Uttarakhand SH 3 in Berinag
- West end: Rameshwar

Location
- Country: India
- States: Uttarakhand

Highway system
- Roads in India; Expressways; National; State; Asian
← NH 109	→ NH 9

Schematic map of National Highways in India

National Highway 309A, commonly referred to as NH 309A, is a single lane highway connecting the city of Rameshwar to Almora in the Indian State of Uttarakhand. Before the creation of Uttarakhand state in 2000, the Almora-Bageshwar stretch of this Highway was a part of the State Highway 37 of Uttar Pradesh, which ran from Bageshwar to Bareilly.

== History ==
The Almora-Bageshwar stretch of this Highway was a part of the provincial 'Almora-Joshimath cart road' during the nineteenth century. The road had a steep descent on the way to Thakla (now Takula), and was surrounded by dense forests of Oak and Rhododendrons. However, the hills were covered by very fine Cheer forests between Thakla and Bageshwar. Later in 1909; several sections of the highway were recorded in the Almora Gazetter as "III class local roads", including the 24 mile 'Gangolihat to Dharamghar road' and the 22 mile 'Bageshwar to Berinag road'.

== Route ==
It starts at Rameshwar and ends at Almora. The NH309A lies entirely in Uttarakhand and passes through the Districts of Pithoragarh, Bageshwar and Almora.

The National Highway 309A connects cities and towns of different districts as follows: Rameshwar, Gangolihat, Berinag, Chaukori, Kanda, Bageshwar, Takula, Almora.

== Junctions ==
NH 9 Terminal near Rameshwar.
NH 109K at Bageshwar.
NH 109 Terminal near Almora.

== National Highway 309B ==
An Alternate highway, known as National Highway 309B or NH309B also connects the cities of Almora and Rameshwar. It cuts down the travel distance to 66 km by covering a direct route rather than taking the long route of 126 km via Bageshwar.

== Gallery ==
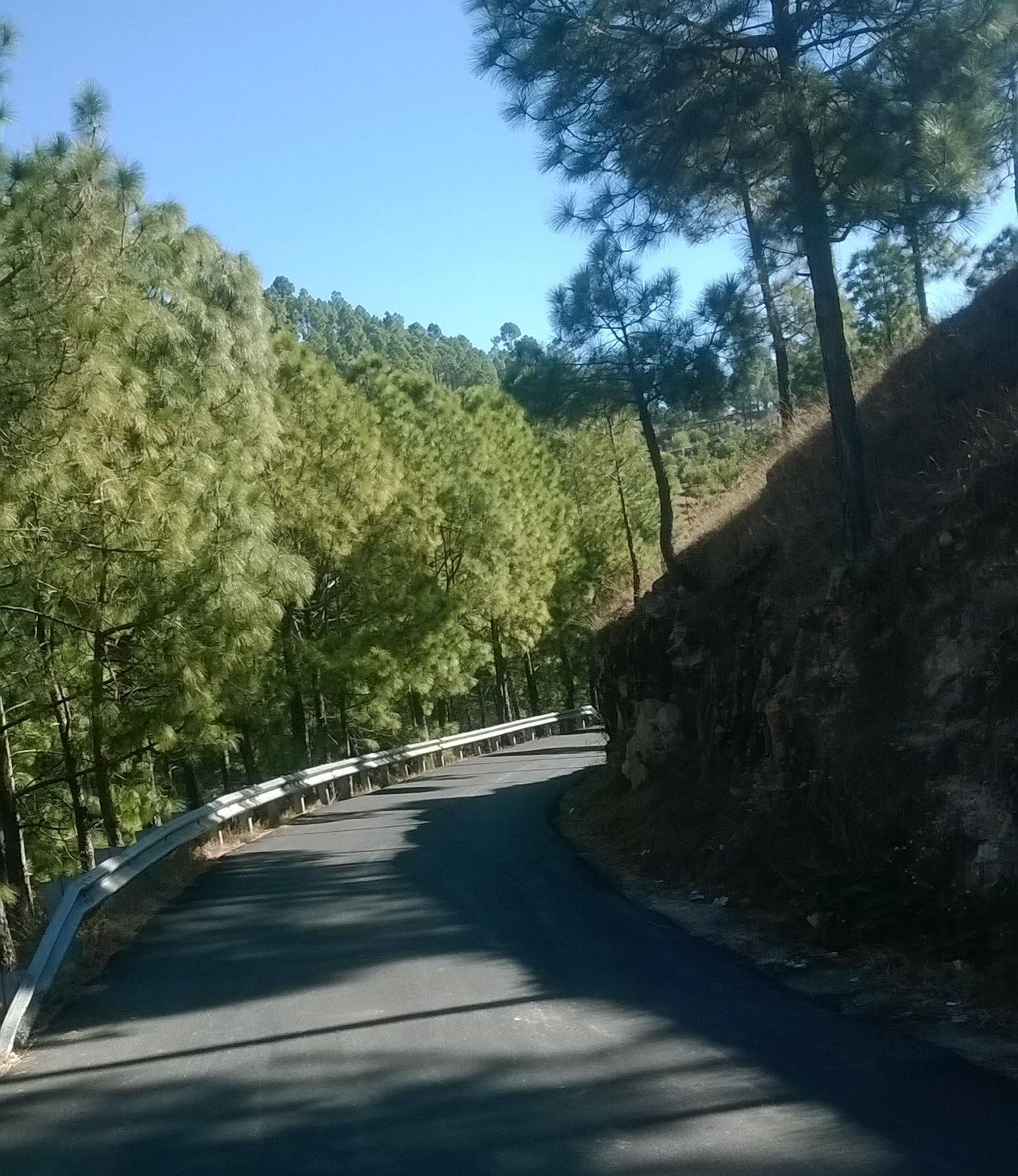
NH 309a near Kanda

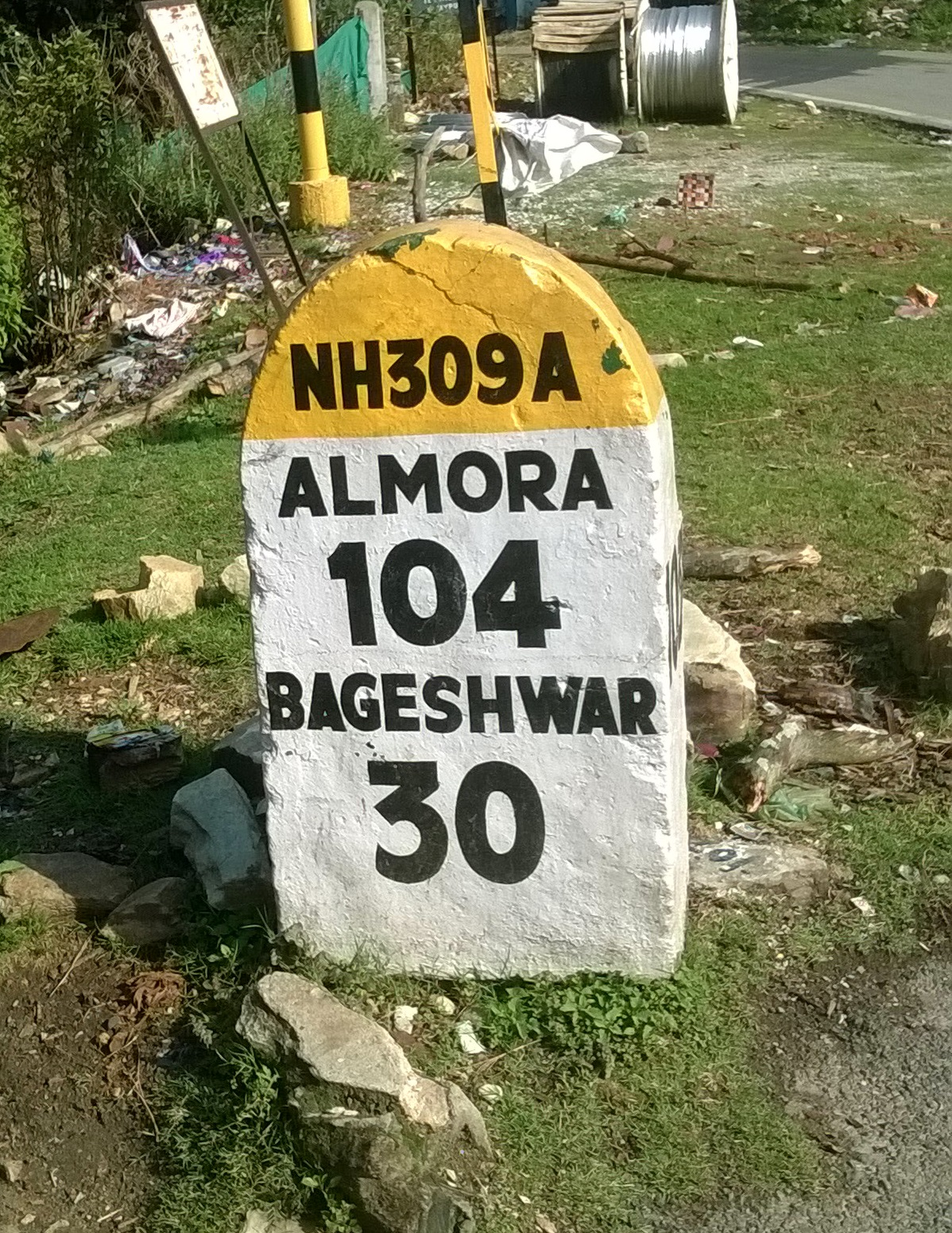
A milestone on NH 309A at Vijaypur
