= Patal Bhuvaneshwar =

Cave Temple in Uttarakhand, India

Patal Bhuvaneshwar Cave Temple
- Patal Bhuvaneshwar Gufa Mandir
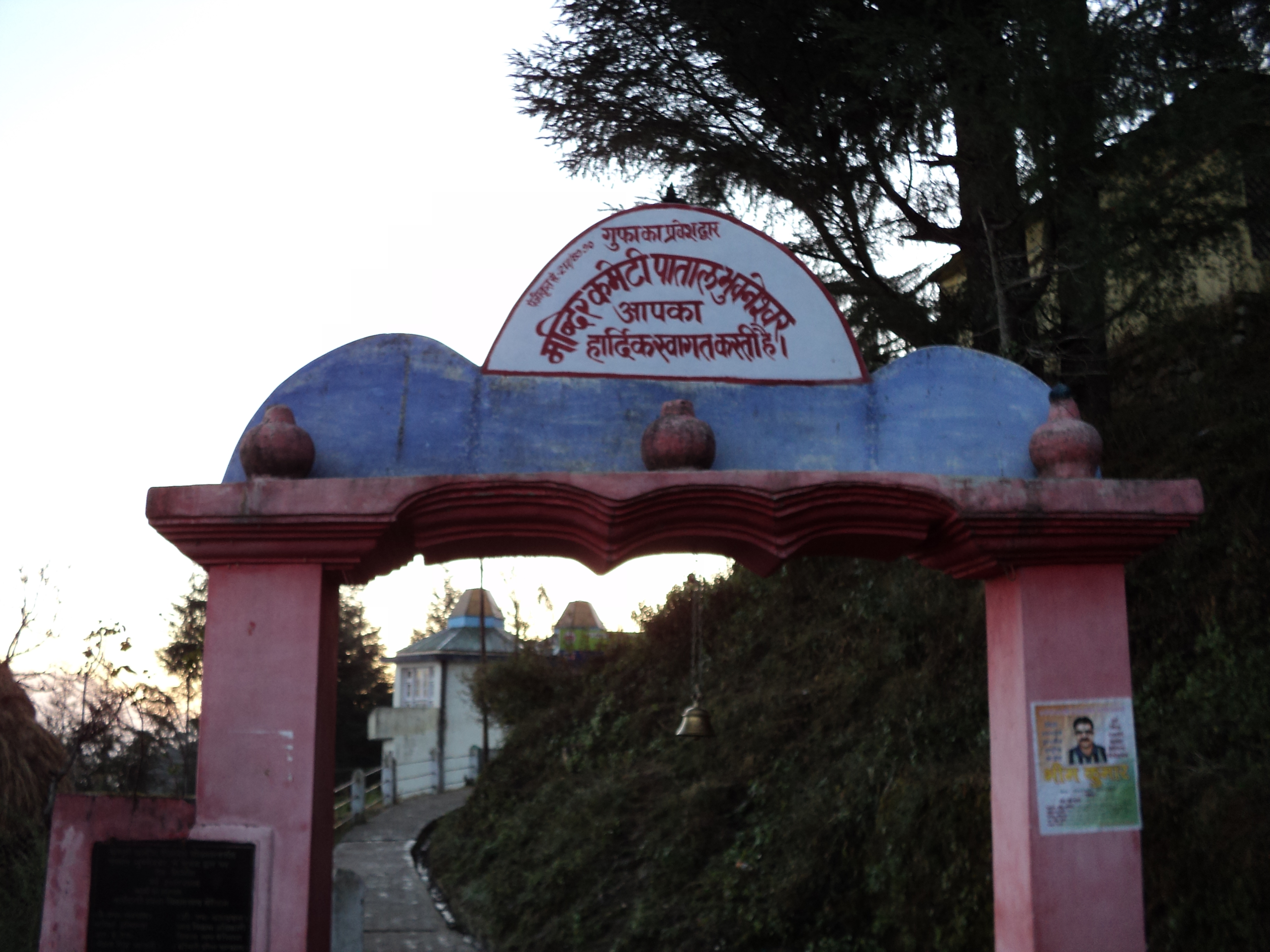
- Entrance gate to Patal Bhuvaneshwar Cave Temple

- Location in Uttarakhand

Religion
- Affiliation: Hinduism
- District: Pithoragarh
- Deity: Shiva; Ganesha; Vishnu; 33 Koti (Types) other deities
- Festival: Maha Shivaratri

Location
- Location: 14 km away from Gangolihat
- State: Uttarakhand
- Country: India

Specifications
- Direction of façade: East
- Elevation: 1,350 m (4,429 ft)

Patal Bhuvaneshwar (Hindi: पाताल भुवनेश्वर) is a limestone Hindu cave temple 14 km from Gangolihat in the Pithoragarh district of Uttarakhand state in India. It is located in the village of Bhubneshwar. Legend and folklore have it that this cave enshrines Lord Shiva and thirty three koti demigods [33 Types, In hindu neumerology "Koti" means "Types"].

The cave is 160 m long and 90 feet deep from the point of entrance. Limestone rock formations have created various spectacular stalactite and stalagmite figures of various hues and forms. This cave has a narrow tunnel-like opening which leads to a number of caves. The cave is fully electrically illuminated. Built by the flow of water, Patal Bhuvaneshwar is not just one cave, rather a series of caves within caves.

== Legend Of the Cave ==
The first human to discover this cave was Raja Ritupurna who was a king in the Surya Dynasty (Surya Vansha) who was ruling Ayodhya (from the time of Rama) during the Treta Yuga.

King Nal was defeated by his wife, Queen Damayanti. In order to escape his wife’s prison Nala requested Ritupurna to hide him. Ritupurna took him to the forests of the Himalayas and asked him to stay there. While going back home he was fascinated by a deer which ran into woods and went after it. He could not find it and took rest under a tree. He had a dream where the deer was asking Ritupurna not to chase him. His sleep broken and as he woke up and went to a cave where a guard was standing. After enquiring about the cave he was allowed to go inside.

Right at the entrance, Ritupurna met Sheshnag who agreed to take him through the cave. It carried him on its hood. He saw the marvels of Gods taking place inside. He saw all the 33-koti [33 Types and not 33 Crores, in Hindu numerology "Koti" means "Types"] gods and goddesses including Lord Shiva himself. It is said that after his visit, the cave was closed for ages with a slight prediction in the Skanda Purana that it will be reopened again in Kali Yuga.

In the Kali Yuga, Adi Shankaracharya, during his visit to Himalayas re-discovered this cave. Since then regular worship and offering are being done at this place.

== History ==
In the Kali Yuga, Adi Shankaracharya visited this cave in 1191 AD. That was the beginning of the modern pilgrimage history, at Patal Bhuvaneshwar.

The journey inside the cave has to be carried in feeble lights, holding protective iron chains. The stone formations of Sheshnag can be seen, holding the earth, heaven and the underworld. ‘Havan’ (fire sacrifice) is performed in a dimly lit, solemn atmosphere, under the spell of holy chants. The cave, it is believed, is connected by an underground route to Mount Kailash.
