= National Highway 109K (India) =

National highway in India

National Highway 109K
- Map of National Highway 109K in red

Route information
- Length: 230 km (140 mi)

Major junctions
- West end: Simli, Karnaprayag
- NH 309A in Bageshwar
- East end: Jauljibi

Location
- Country: India
- States: Uttarakhand

Highway system
- Roads in India; Expressways; National; State; Asian
← NH 109	→ NH 9

Schematic map of National Highways in India

National Highway 109K, commonly referred to as NH 109K, is a National highway connecting the city of Simli to Jauljibi in the Indian State of Uttarakhand. The Highway was Notified on 12 Feb 2021 under the Bharatmala project of Government of India.

== Route ==
It starts at Simli and ends at Jauljibi. The NH109K lies entirely in Uttarakhand and passes through the Districts of Chamoli, Bageshwar and Pithoragarh.

The National Highway 109K connects cities and towns of different districts as follows: Simli, Tharali, Gwaldam, Baijnath, Bageshwar, Kapkot, Tejam, Munsiari, Madkot and Jauljibi.

== Junctions ==
NH 109 Terminal near Simli, Karnaprayag.
NH 309A at Bageshwar.
NH 9 Terminal near Jauljibi.
