= Berinag =

- Hill Station and Municipality
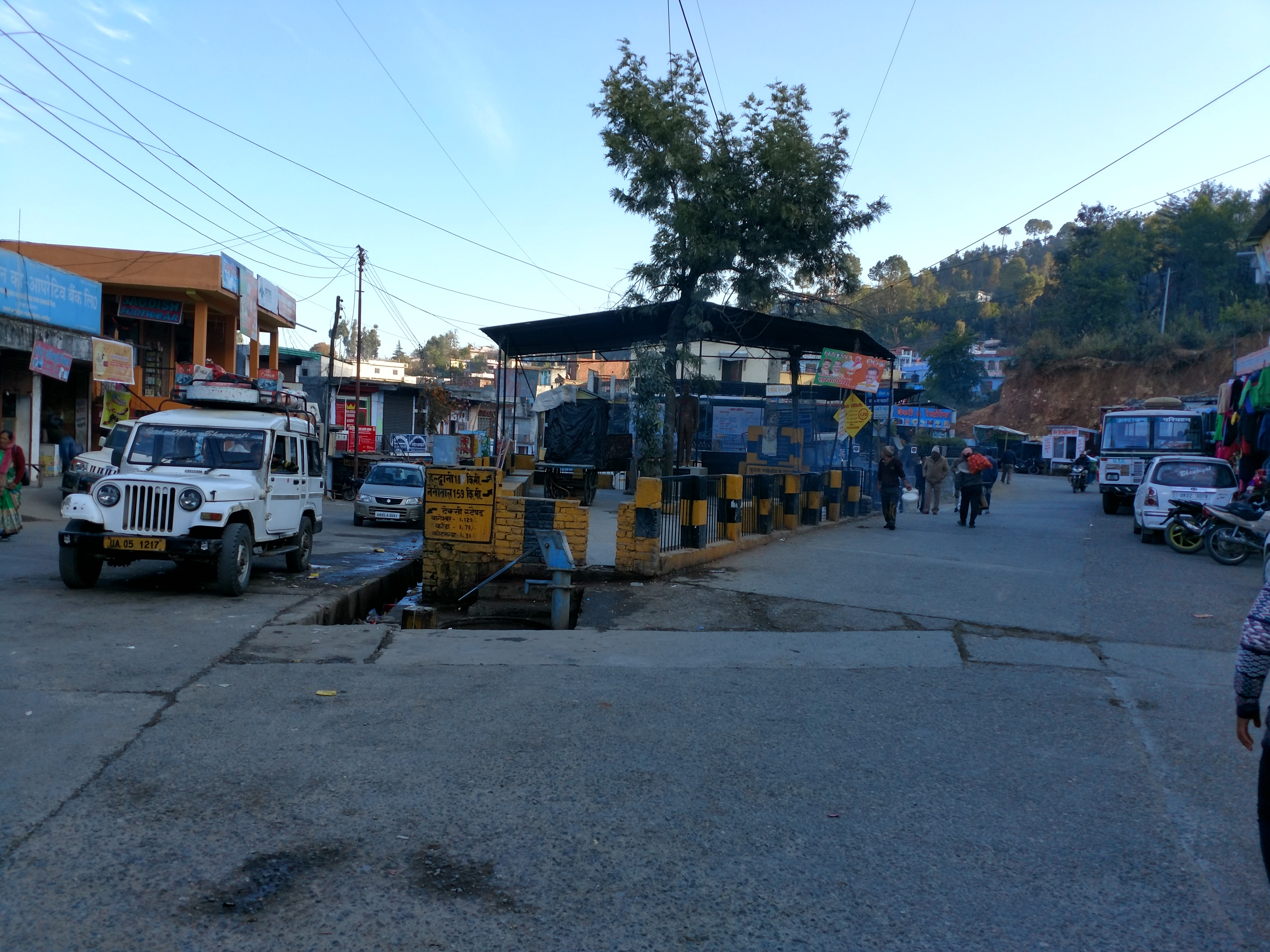
- Berinag taxi stand in Pithoragarh district, Uttarakhand, India

- Location in Uttarakhand, India Berinag (India)
- Coordinates: 29.80°N 80.07°E
- Country: India
- State: Uttarakhand
- District: Pithoragarh
- Elevation: 1,895 m (6,217 ft)

Languages
  - Official: Hindi
- Time zone: UTC+5:30 (IST)
- Vehicle registration: UK
- Website: uk.gov.in

Berinag is a hill station and municipality, located 124 km from Pithoragarh city in the Pithoragarh district, which is the easternmost Himalayan district in the state of Uttarakhand, India. It is one of the six Administrative Subdivisions (tehsil) of Pithoragarh district. National Highway 309A passes through Berinag. Closest prominent villages include Garawon, Dhanoli, Bana, Bhattigaon, Bangali, Quarali, Tripuradevi and Sangarh.

Berinag gets its name from the Berinag Temple (called as ‘Bedinag’ locally), which is a Nāg Devta Temple situated at the top of Berinag Hill. Berinag is among the many temples devoted to Nāgas namely Dhaulinag (Dhavalnag), Kalinag (Kaliyanag), Feninag (Faninag), Bashukinag (Vasukinag), Pinglenag and Harinag. Berinag offers a panoramic view of the Greater Himalayas, from Garhwal Himalayas to the Nepal ranges, especially lofty peaks like Panchachuli and Nanda Devi. The region is famous for tea estates developed during the British rule. The Berinag tea grown here was a highly sought-after tea in London tea. And Om mountain is also visible from here.

== Geography ==
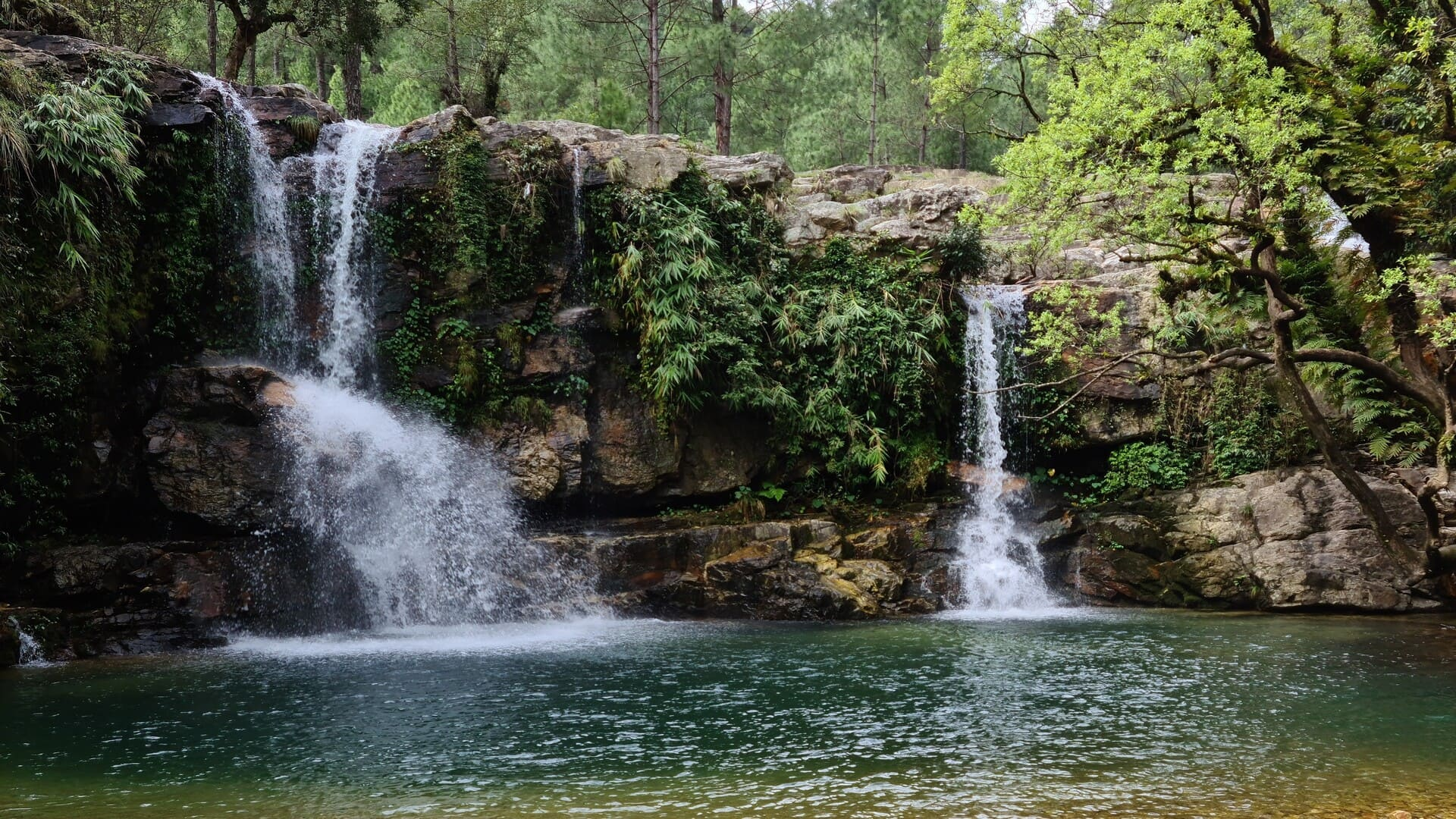
Dunkhola waterfall

Berinag is located at 29.80°N 80.07°E. It has an average elevation of 1,895 metres (6,217 feet) above mean Sea Level.It is situated 460 km North-East of the National Capital New Delhi and 443 km South-East of the State Capital Dehradun. It lies in the Kumaon division and is situated 160 km North-East of Nainital, The Headquarters of Kumaon division. Berinag is situated in a valley of the Kumaon Hills of the Central Himalaya range. The chief trees are the Chir Pine, Himalayan Cypress, Pindrow Fir, alder, Cedrus deodara, sal or iron-wood, and saindan. Limestone, sandstone, slate, gneiss and granite constitute the principal geological formations.

== Culture ==
Berinag is Culturally Rich region where various folk songs and dances are performed during auspicious occasions like marriage and festivals. Chacheri, Jagar and Chholiya are famous among them. These folk songs are played on instruments including dhol, damau, turri, ransingha, dholki, daur, thali, bhankora, mandan and mashakbaja. Music is also used as a medium through which the gods are invoked. Jagar is a form of spirit worship in which the singer, or Jagariya, sings a ballad of the gods, with allusions to great epics, like Mahabharat and Ramayana, that describe the adventures and exploits of the god being invoked. Ramleela, Berinag Mahotsav, Berinag Kautik has been staged annually.

== Berinag Tea Estate ==
Berinag Tea was a highly sought-after brick-tea in London tea houses. Berinag Tea estate was owned and distributed by D.S. Bist & Sons, a company owned by Thakur Dan Singh Bist.

== Transport ==
- Nearest airport is Naini Saini Airport, Pithoragarh : 112 km. Distance from Pantnagar Airport (PGH): 210 km.
- Nearest railway station is Kathgodam : 178 km.
- Berinag is well connected by road with Almora-96 km, Nainital-160 km, Haldwani-200 km, Bageshwar-62 km, Pithoragarh-85 km

== See also ==
- Bigul

== Image Gallery ==
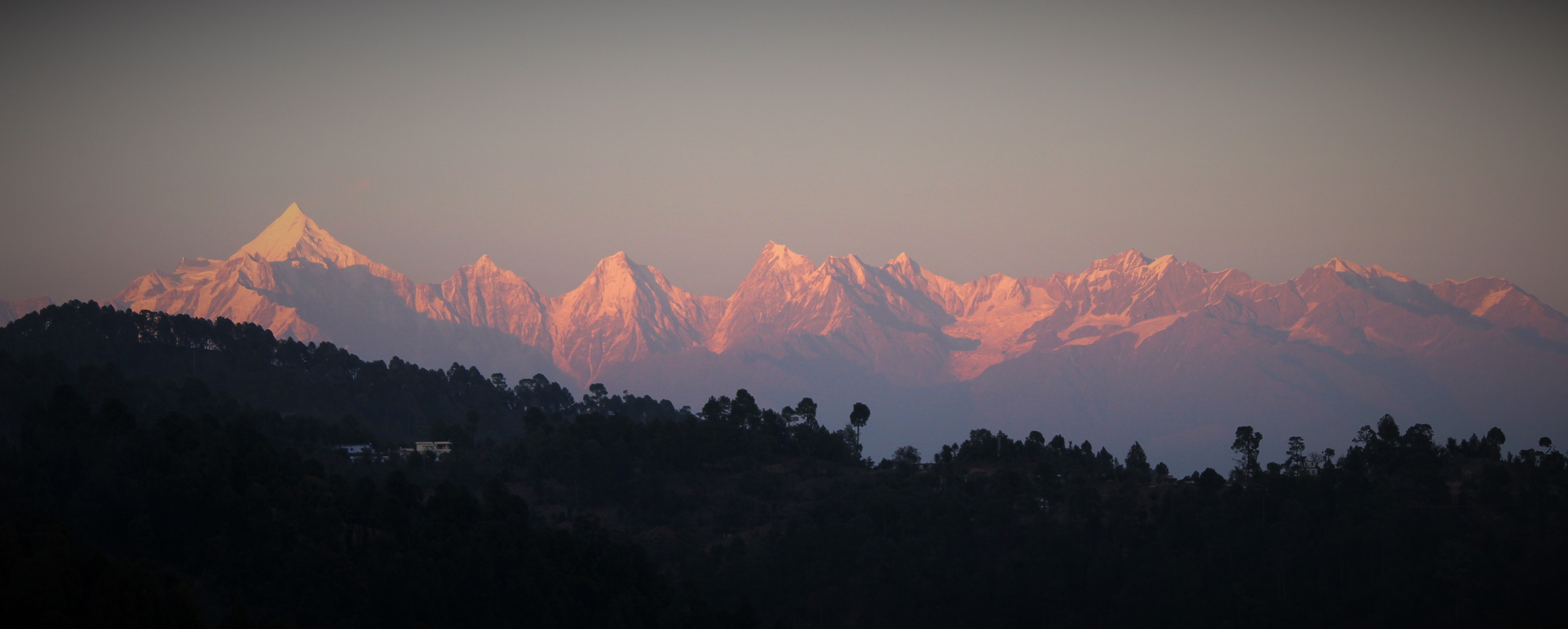
The Panchchuli as seen from Berinag, 2015

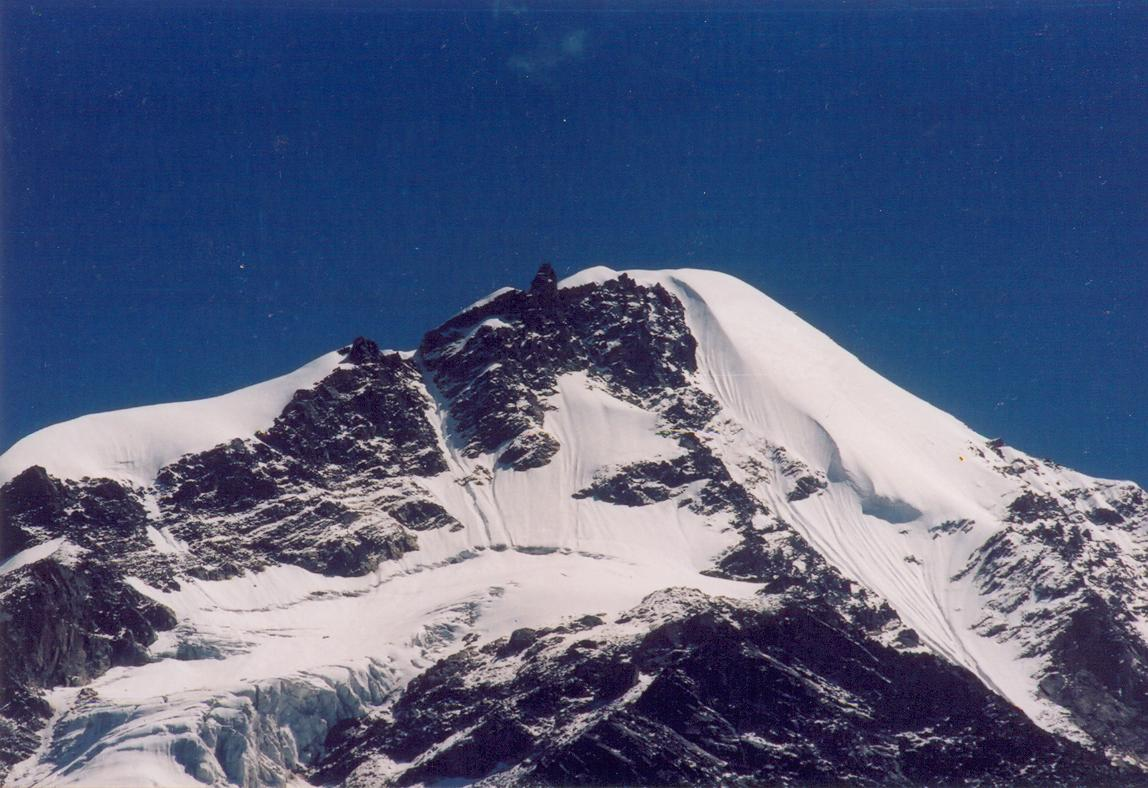
a Himalayan peak

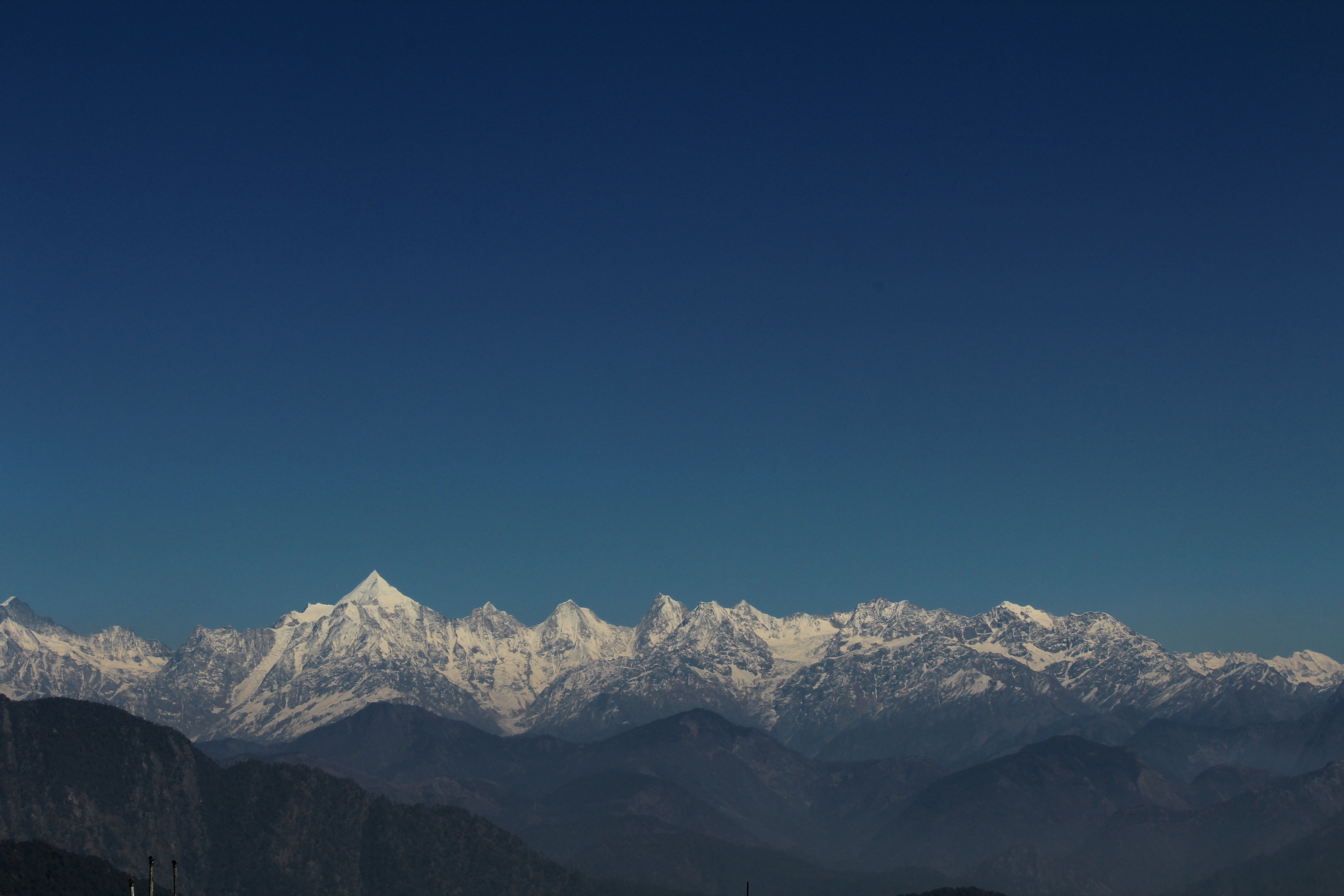
The Panchchuli as seen from Berinag, 2016
