= Kanda, Uttarakhand =

Kanda
- town
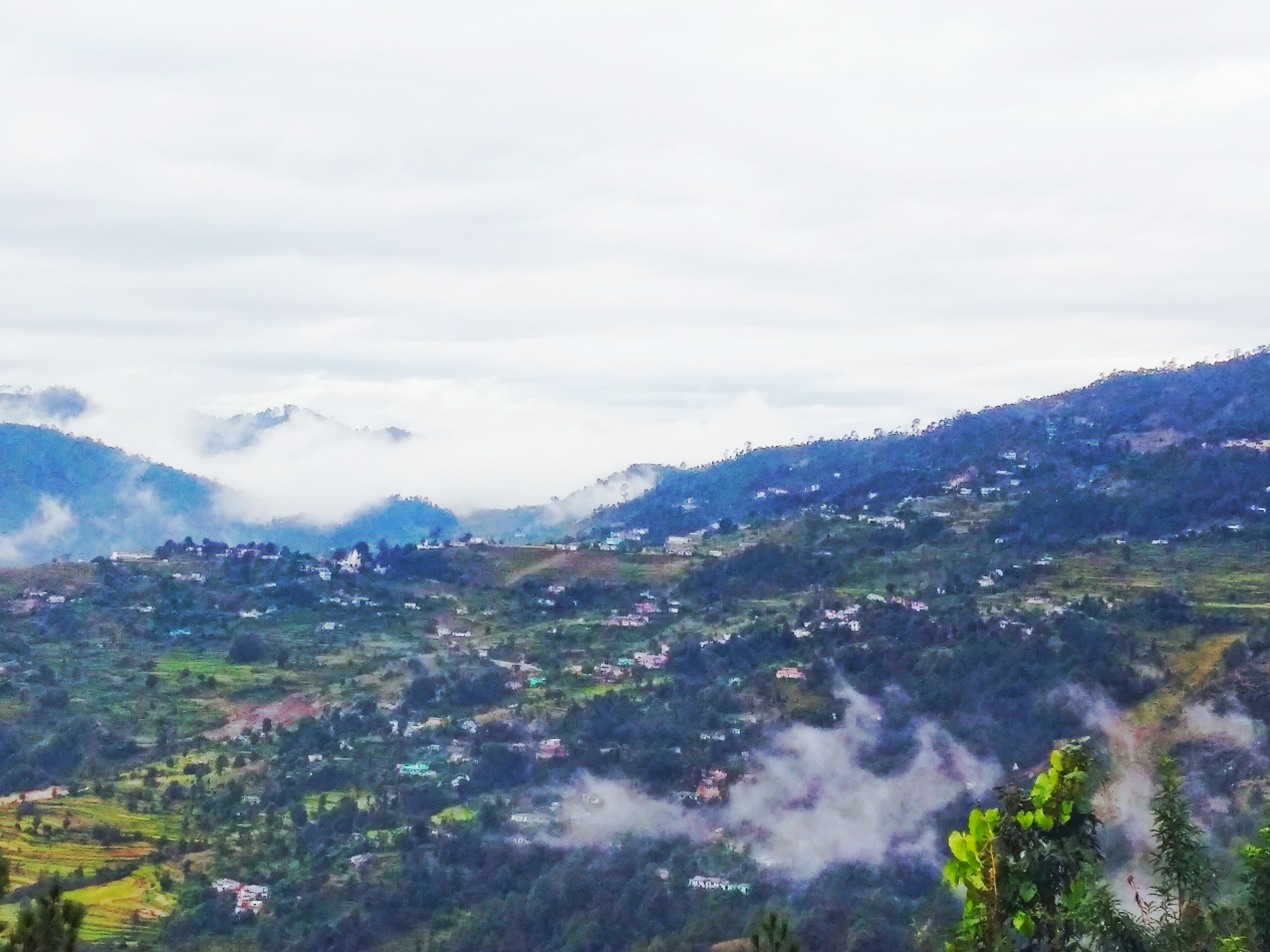
- View of Kanda from Vijaypur-Khantoli Road

- Location in Uttarakhand, India Kanda (India)
- Coordinates: 29.85°N 79.85°E
- Country: India
- State: Uttarakhand
- District: Bageshwar

Population (2011)
  - Total: 26,272

Languages
  - Official: Hindi
- Time zone: UTC+5:30 (IST)
- Postal code: 263631
- Vehicle registration: UK
- Website: http://www.bageshwar.nic.in

Kanda is a small historic town and tehsil in Bageshwar district, in the state of Uttarakhand, India.

== History ==
Kanda was ruled by the Katyuri Kings from the 7th to the 13th century. Upon the disintegration of the Katyuris in 13th century, Kanda came under the rule of Mankoti kings of Gangoli. In the 16th century, the Chand king, Balo Kalyan Chand, invaded Mankot, the seat of Mankoti kings, and annexed Gangoli to his kingdom, the Kumaon Kingdom.

== Geography ==
Kanda is located 26 kilometres (16 mi) east of the district headquarters, the city of Bageshwar, and to the northwest of the city of Pithoragarh. Its surrounding landscape is characterized by mountains, terraced fields, and organic tea platforms. However, this landscape is under threat, as the quarrying of soft stone is reported to have caused damage to the local ecology.

== Transport ==
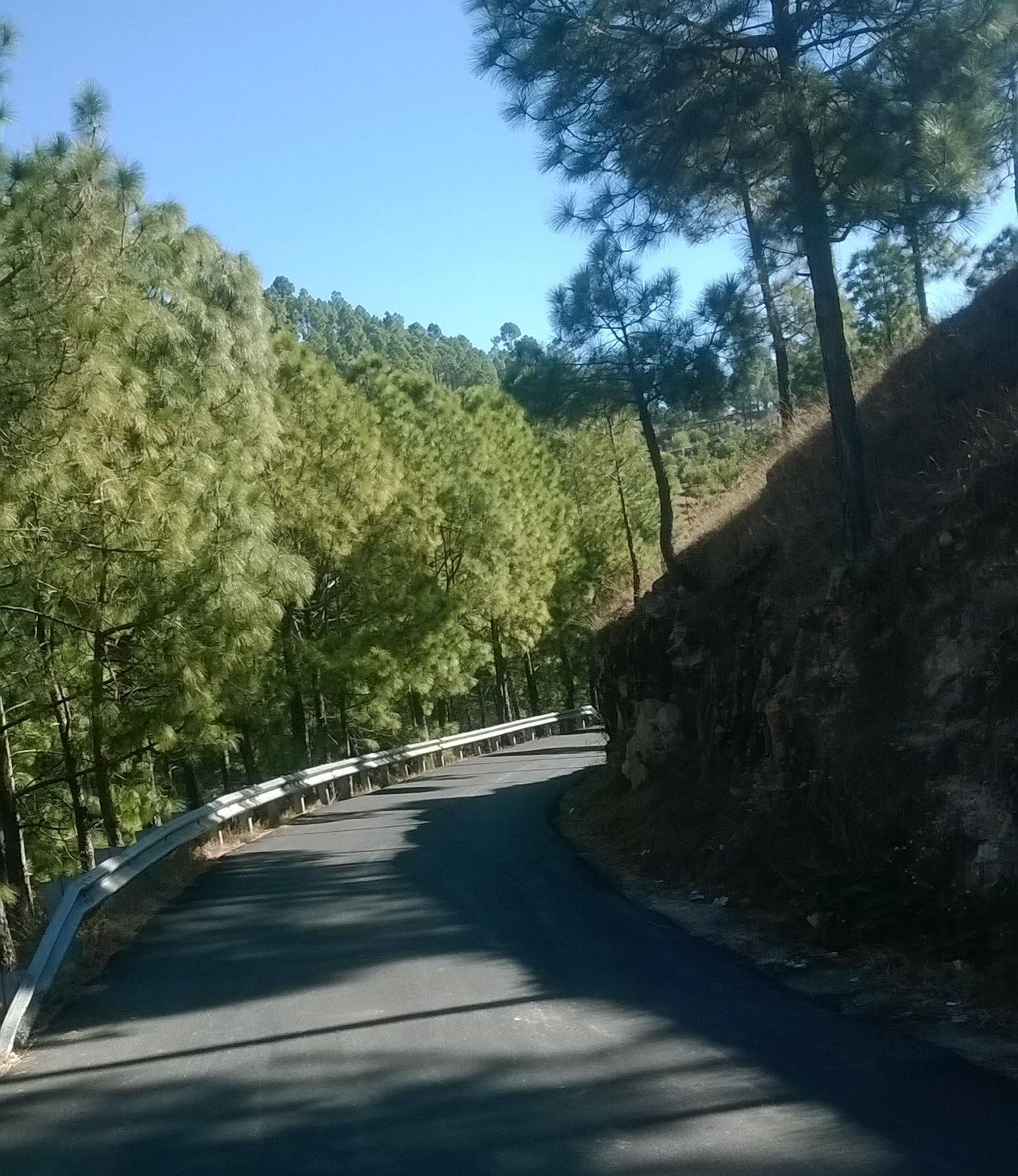
NH 309A near Kanda

National Highway 309A passes through Kanda. Most of the internal transportation is via shared taxis called "Jeeps". Jeeps are available for the nearby cities of Bageshwar and Chaukori. Roadway buses connect Kanda to Delhi, while Kumaon Motor Owners Union (KMOU) transport connects to other major cities in the state of Uttarakhand, such as Almora, Haldwani, Pithoragarh, Bankot, and Didihat.

== Economy ==
Kanda is known for its scenery, rural tourism, Kalishan temple, and town center typified by its cluster of markets, which are main attractions for the town's developing tourism industry. Many young people from this area are serving in defence forces. Kanda Mahotsav is a three day festival. Ramlila Dussehra is celebrated here as well.

== Demographics ==
The tehsil has a population of 26,272 as of 2011.

== Education ==
Kanda is known for its schools and offers options for higher education. It is the site of the old Middle School (now Government Inter College) that was established in 1902. Government Degree college was opened in 2008 and several new courses were introduced in 2016.

- Government Inter College, Kanda
- Government Industrial Training Institute (ITI), Kanda
- Government Polytechnic Kanda
- Countrywide Public School, Kanda
- GDC-Government Degree College Kanda

== See also ==
- Kandel (surname), surname originating from the town

== Bibliography ==
- Pande, Badri Datt (1993). History of Kumaun : English version of "Kumaun ka itihas". Almora: Shyam Prakashan. ISBN 81-85865-01-9.
- Hāṇḍā, Omacanda (2002). History of Uttaranchal. New Delhi: Indus Publishing. ISBN 9788173871344.
