= Gangolihat =

- Town
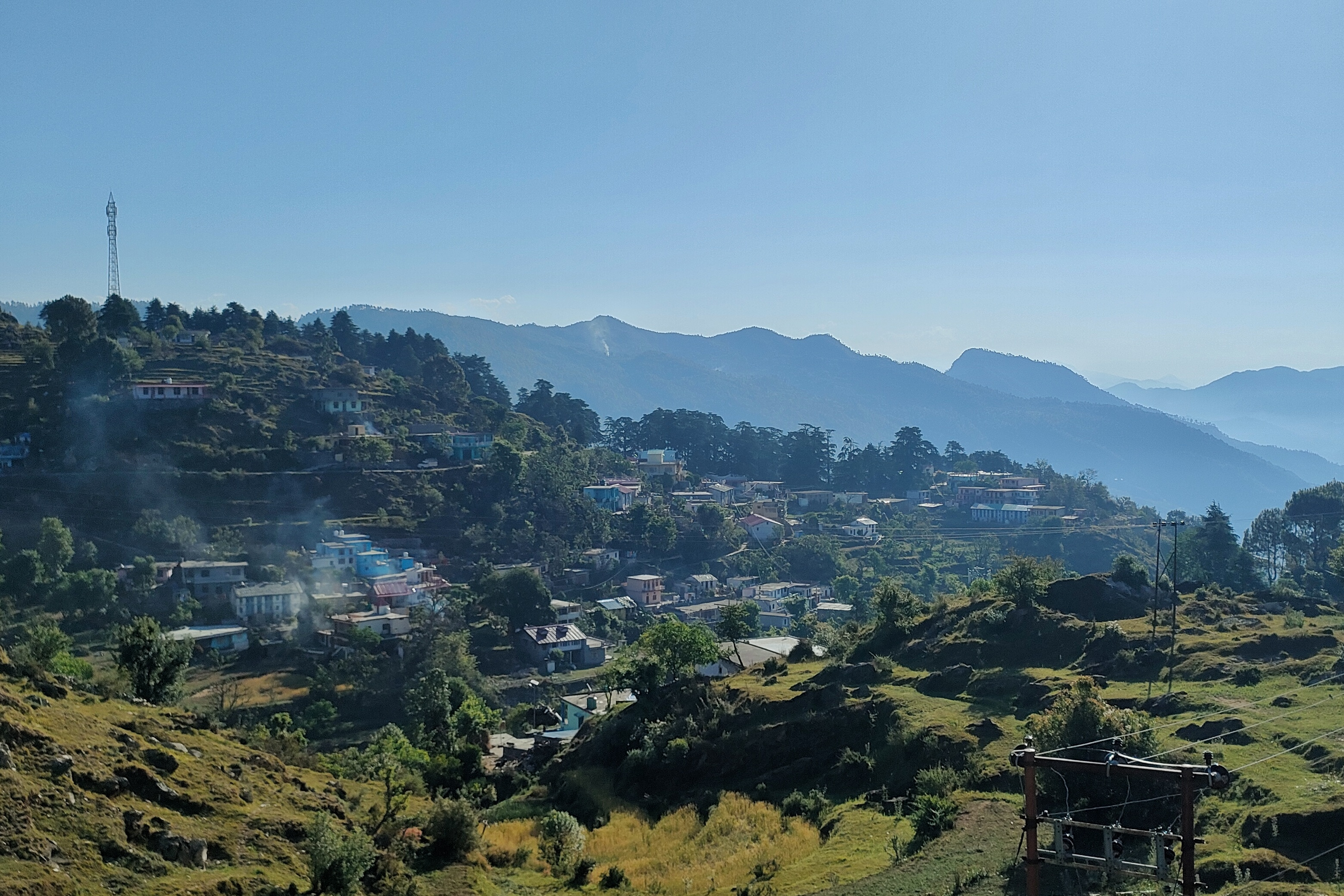
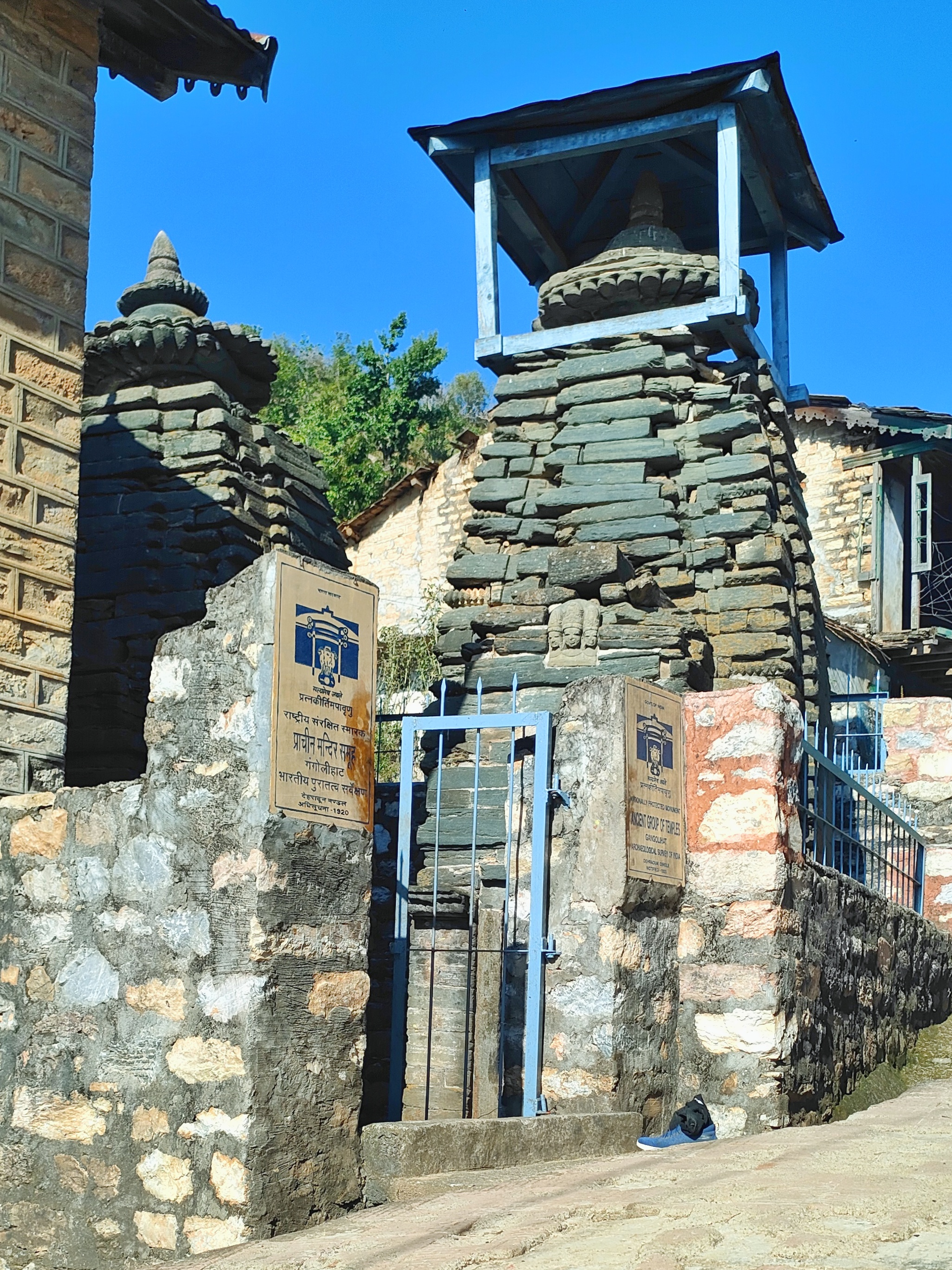
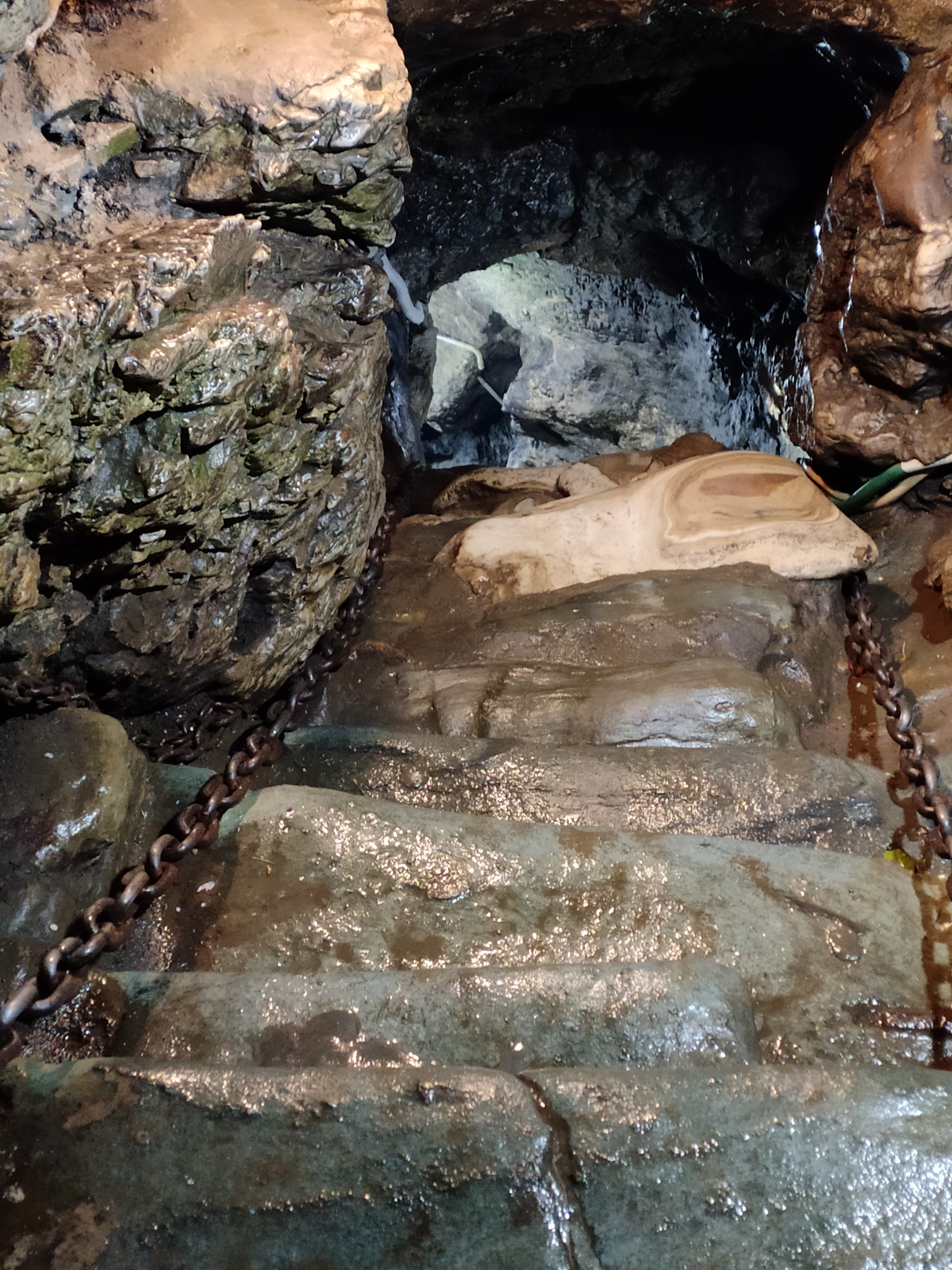
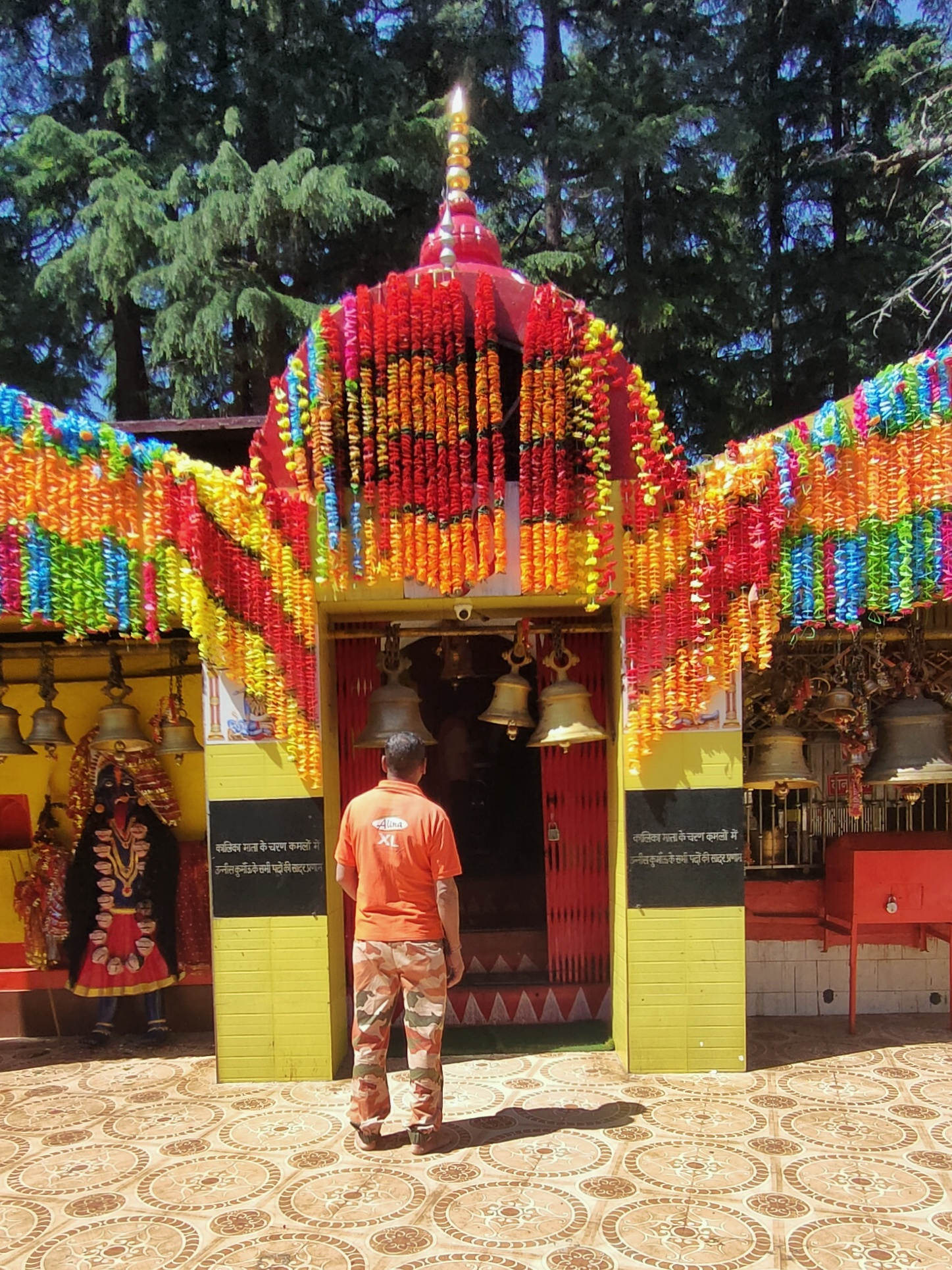
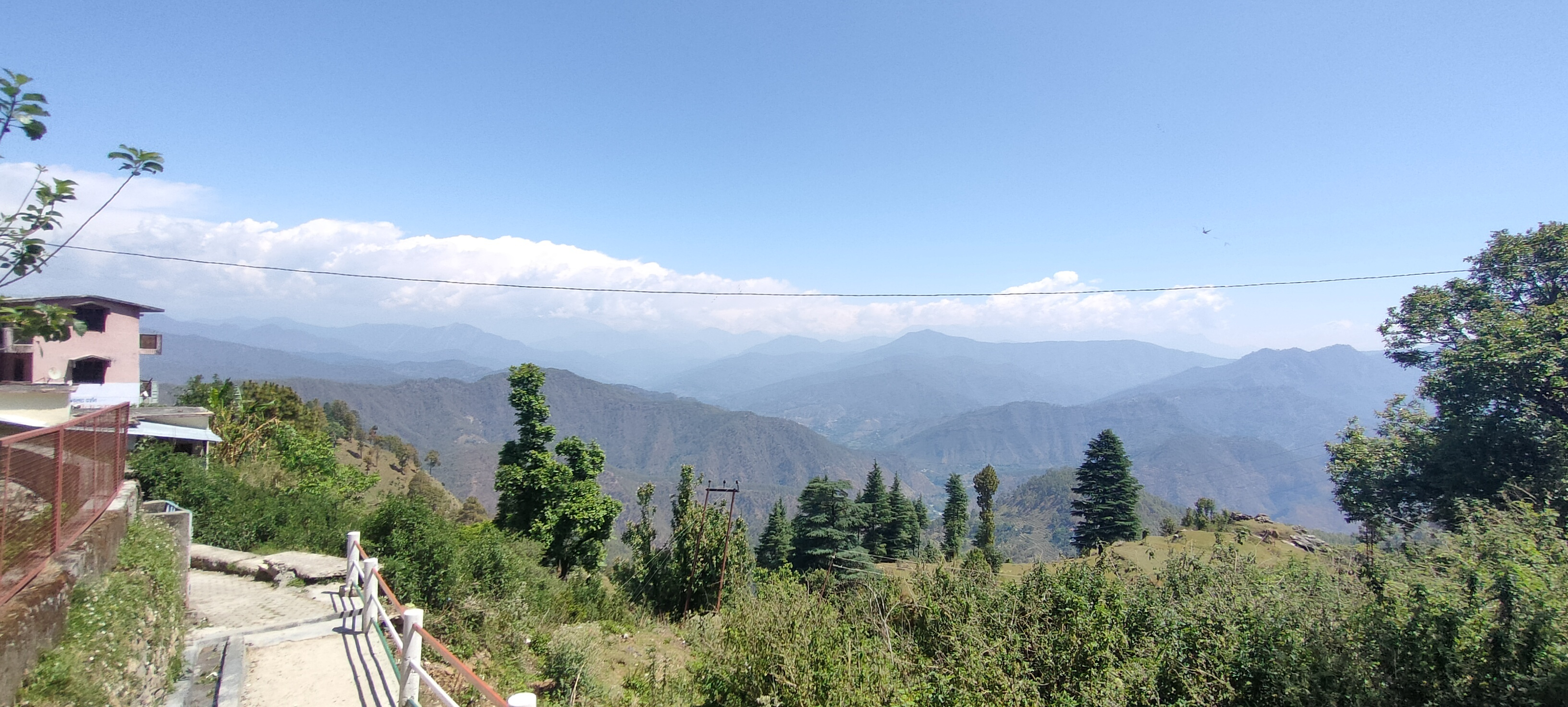
- From top, left to right: Gangolihat Skyline; Gangolihat Group of Temples; Patal Bhuvaneshwar; Hat Kalika Temple; view from Patal Bhuvaneshwar

- Location in Uttarakhand, India Gangolihat (India)
- Coordinates: 29.67°N 80.05°E
- Country: India
- State: Uttarakhand
- District: Pithoragarh

Area
  - Total: 7 km^{2} (2.7 sq mi)
- Elevation: 1,760 m (5,770 ft)

Population (2011)
  - Total: 7,112
  - Density: 1,000/km^{2} (2,600/sq mi)

Languages
  - Official: Hindi
- Time zone: UTC+5:30 (IST)
- Vehicle registration: UK
- Website: uk.gov.in

Gangolihat is a town in the Pithoragarh district of Uttarakhand, India. It is the headquarters of its eponymous tehsil- one of the 12 revenue subdivisions of the Pithorarh district.

The town is famous for the Hat Kalika Temple, dedicated to the goddess Kali. The temple complex is surrounded by a prominent grove of deodar cedar trees. Additionally, the remains of older temples and a masonry well bearing ancient inscriptions are located close to the site in the south-west.

== History ==
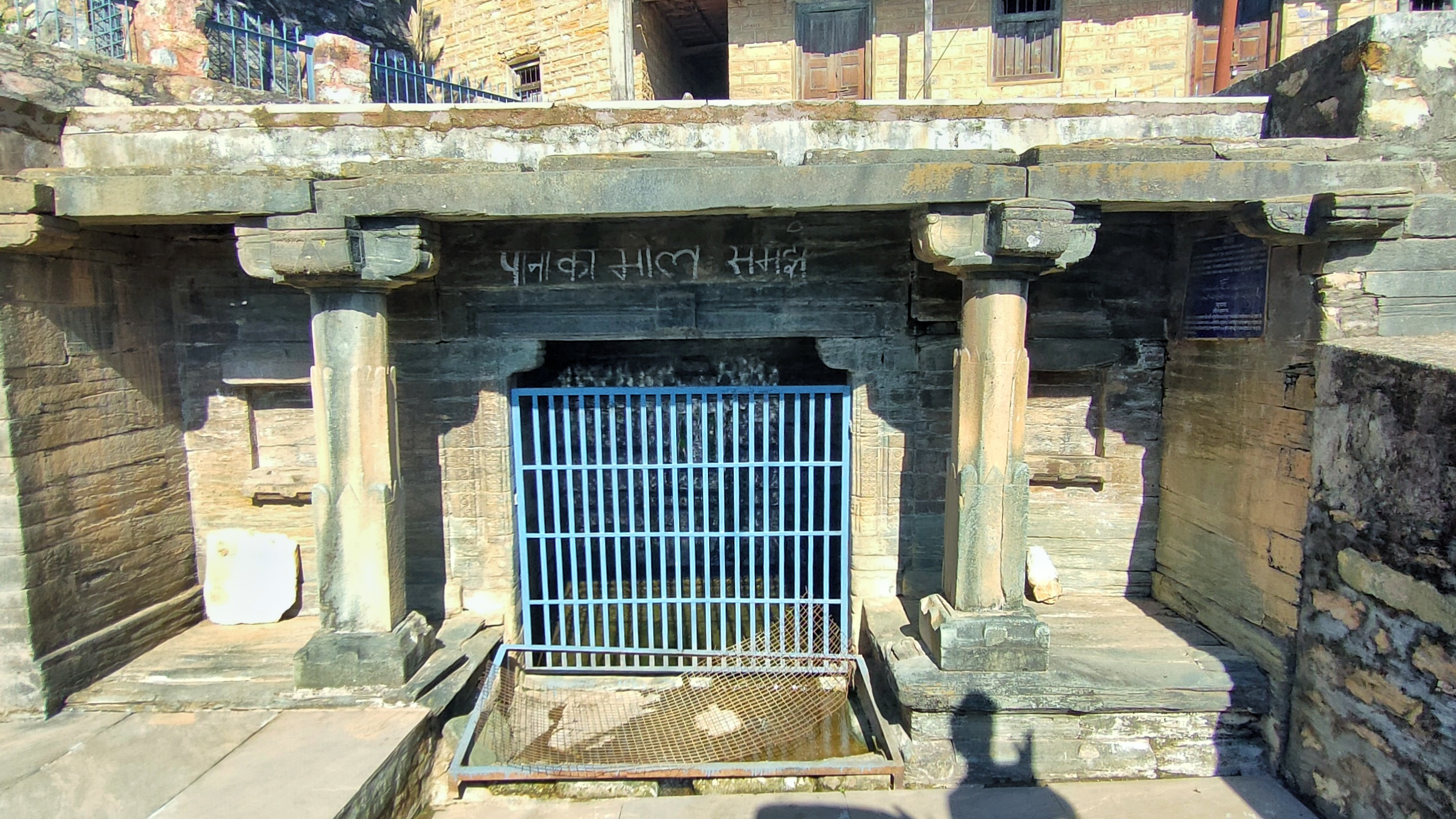
Janhavi naula houses a stone inscription dated 1264 A.D. having the names of the Mankoti kings.

Being situated between the Saryu Ganga and Ram Ganga rivers, the region where Gangolihat is situated was earlier called Gangavali, which got corrupted to Gangoli over the course of time. Gangolihat was the primary market and main trading center of the Gangoli region. Before the thirteenth century, the region was under the rule of the Katyuri kings.

Around the thirteenth century, Gangolihat came under the rule of the Mankoti kings, who had their capital at Mankot. In Janhavi naula at Gangolihat belonging to 1264 A.D. there is a piece of stone with the names of the Gangoli kings and also records an inscription about a possible invasion of Mankot by the Delhi Sultan Nasiruddin Mahmud Shah. On the piece of stone of 1352, found in the temple of Baijnath, is written that the kings of Gangoli (Hamirdeo, Lingarajdeo, Dharaldeo) built the kalash of the temple.

The kingdom of Gangoli was invaded by the Chand king, Balo Kalyan Chand, in the 16th century. Following its defeat, Mankot was merged into the Kumaon Kingdom. In the nineteenth century, Gangoli was made a pargana of Almora district, and the pargana headquarters were established in Gangolihat town itself. The town of Gangolihat (locally referred to simply as Hat) served as an important stop on the route from Almora to Pithoragarh. According to the Almora Gazetteer, the population of the village in 1901 was 497.

In the early 19th century, the broader Gangoli pargana was densely forested and notorious for man-eating tigers. Following the Gurkha policy of disarmament, local inhabitants were left largely defenceless. A report by Commissioner George William Traill in 1821 noted that 373 people had been killed by tigers in the Gangoli area within a three-year span. By the early 20th century, the indigenous tiger population had been largely exterminated, and the cleared valleys led to a highly fertile and prosperous agricultural region known for exporting grain, ghee, walnuts, and oranges.

== Geography ==
Gangolihat is located at 29.48°N 80.05°E. It has an average elevation of 1,760 metres (5,773 feet). It is 78 km from Pithoragarh. The main town is at a hill top. The region is surrounded by two rivers-Saryu and Ramganga.

The approach to the town historically featured steep ascents from the Ramganga and Sarju river valleys, which were crossed by iron suspension bridges. The surrounding hillsides have a southern aspect and are characterized by open, grassy slopes thinly clothed with pine forests. Notable flora in the area includes the horse chestnut and the Lilium wallichianum, a large white lily that blooms abundantly on the open slopes in August.

== Demographics ==
According to the 2011 census of India, Gangolihat town is spread over an area of 7 sq km and has a population of 7,112. Gangolihat has an average literacy rate of 74.11%.

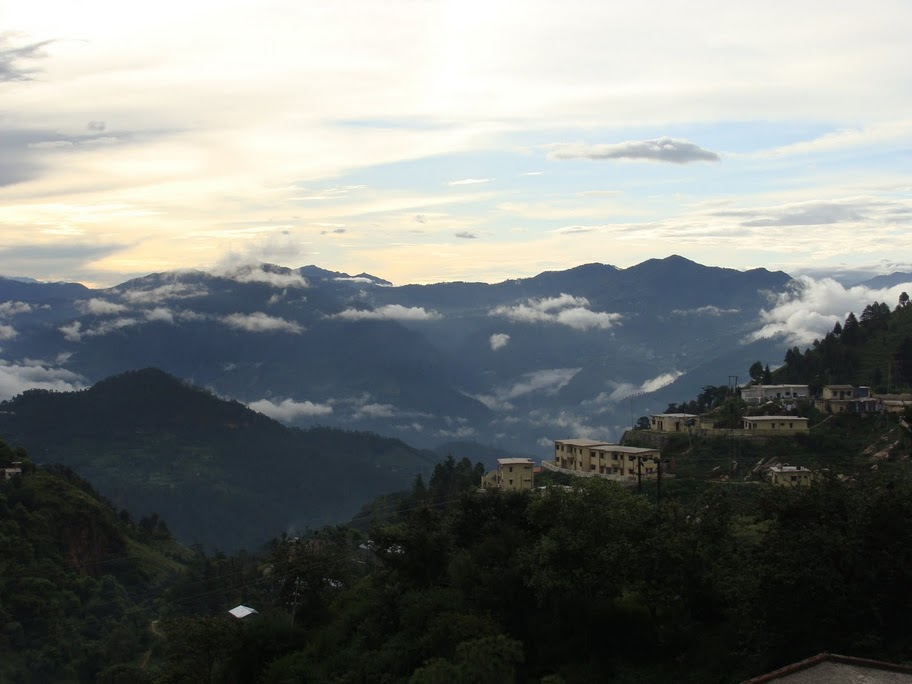
Hills view from Gangolihat
