= Chaukori =

- Village
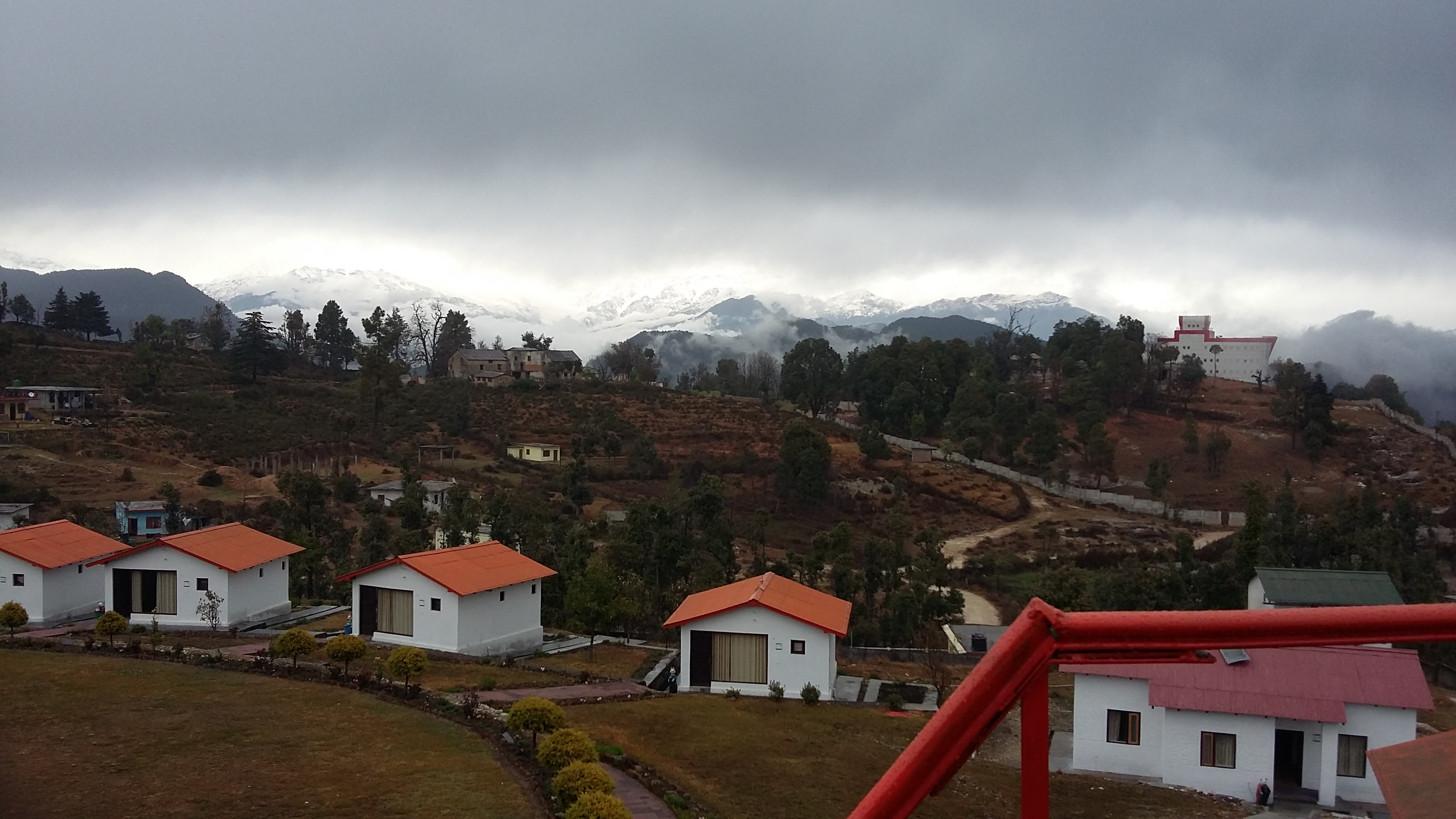
- Chaukori
- Nickname: b
- Location in Uttarakhand, India Chaukori (India)
- Coordinates: 29.84124°N 80.030594°E
- Country: India
- State: Uttarakhand
- Division: Kumaon
- District: Pithoragarh

Area
  - Total: 8.3618 km^{2} (3.2285 sq mi)
- Elevation: 2,010 m (6,590 ft)

Population (2011)
  - Total: 1,163
  - Density: 139.1/km^{2} (360.2/sq mi)

Languages
  - Official: Hindi; Sanskrit
- Time zone: UTC+5:30 (IST)
- Postal code: 262531
- Vehicle registration: UK 05
- Website: uk.gov.in

Chaukori is a hill station in the Pithoragarh district set among the lofty peaks of the western Himalayan Range in the Kumaon Division of Uttarakhand, India. To its north is Tibet and to its south is Terai. The Mahakali River, running along its eastern boundary, forms the Indo-Nepal international border.

== Geography ==
Chaukori is located in Berinag Tehsil of Pithoragarh district in Uttarakhand, India. It is situated 10km away from sub-district headquarters Berinag and 86km away from district headquarter Pithoragarh. Chaukori's elevation is 2010m.

== Demographics ==
Chaukori is a medium sized village located in Berinag of Pithoragarh district, Uttarakhand with a total of 248 families residing. The total population of Chaukori is 1163 out of which 672 are males while 491 are females as Census 2011. In Chaukori, population of children with age 0-6 is 190 which makes up 16.34 % of total population. The average sex ratio of Chaukori is 731 which is lower than Uttarakhand state average of 963. The child sex ratio for Chaukori as per census is 624, lower than Uttarakhand average of 890. Chaukori has a lower literacy rate as compared to Uttarakhand. In 2011, the literacy rate of Chaukori was 76.36 % compared to 78.82% for Uttarakhand. In Chaukori, male literacy stands at 87.03 % while the female literacy rate was 62.20 %. In Chaukori, most of the villagers are from Schedule Caste (SC). Schedule Caste (SC) constitutes 38.95 % while Schedule Tribe (ST) were 0.77 % of total population in Chaukori. In Chaukori, out of total population, 354 were engaged in work activities.As per constitution of India and Panchyati Raaj Act, Chaukori is administrated by a Sarpanch who is an elected representative of the village.

== Transport ==
Chaukori is well connected with roads to major destinations in Kumaon. The Udiari Bend in Chaukori marks the intersection of roads coming from Kanda-Bageshwar, Seraghat-Almora, and Thal-Munsiari. Seraghat is a tri-junction that connects to Naini through a separate road via Dhankhet, Salla Bhatkot, Nali, Kunj Kimola, and other villages. Bus services are provided by the state owned 'Uttarakhand Transport Corporation'. Buses connect Chaukori with the cities of Bageshwar, Pithoragarh, Almora, Dharchula, and Delhi. Distances from other cities and towns are listed below.

- Delhi - 530 km
- Kathgodam - 198 km via Almora and Bageshwar
- Nainital - 183 km

The closest railhead is 198 km away at Kathgodam.

== Image Gallery ==
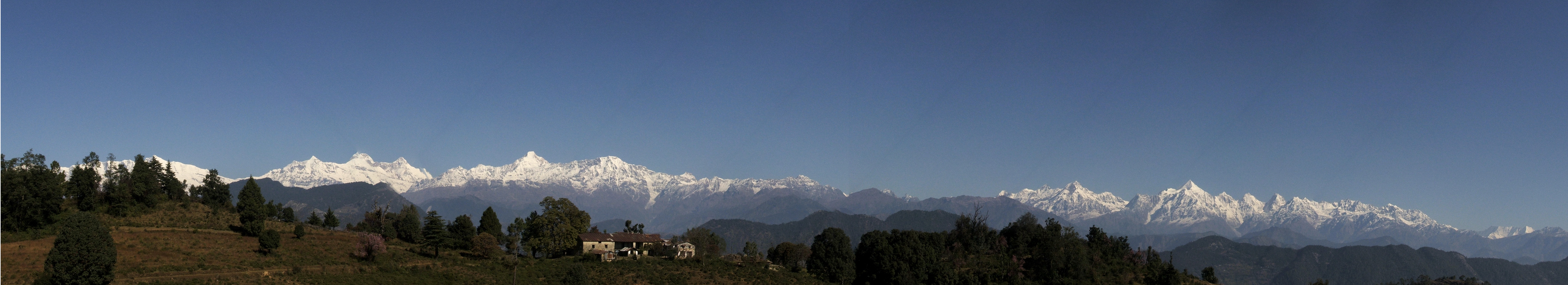
Panoramic view of the Himalayas, from Chaukori

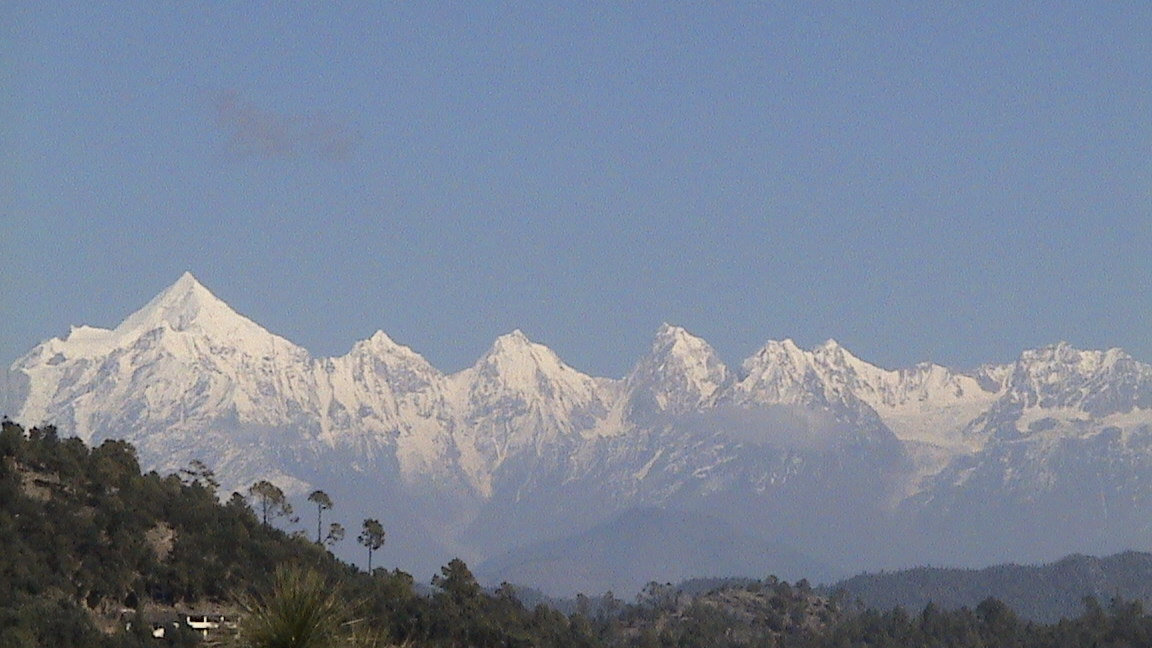
Panchchuli peaks from Chaukori

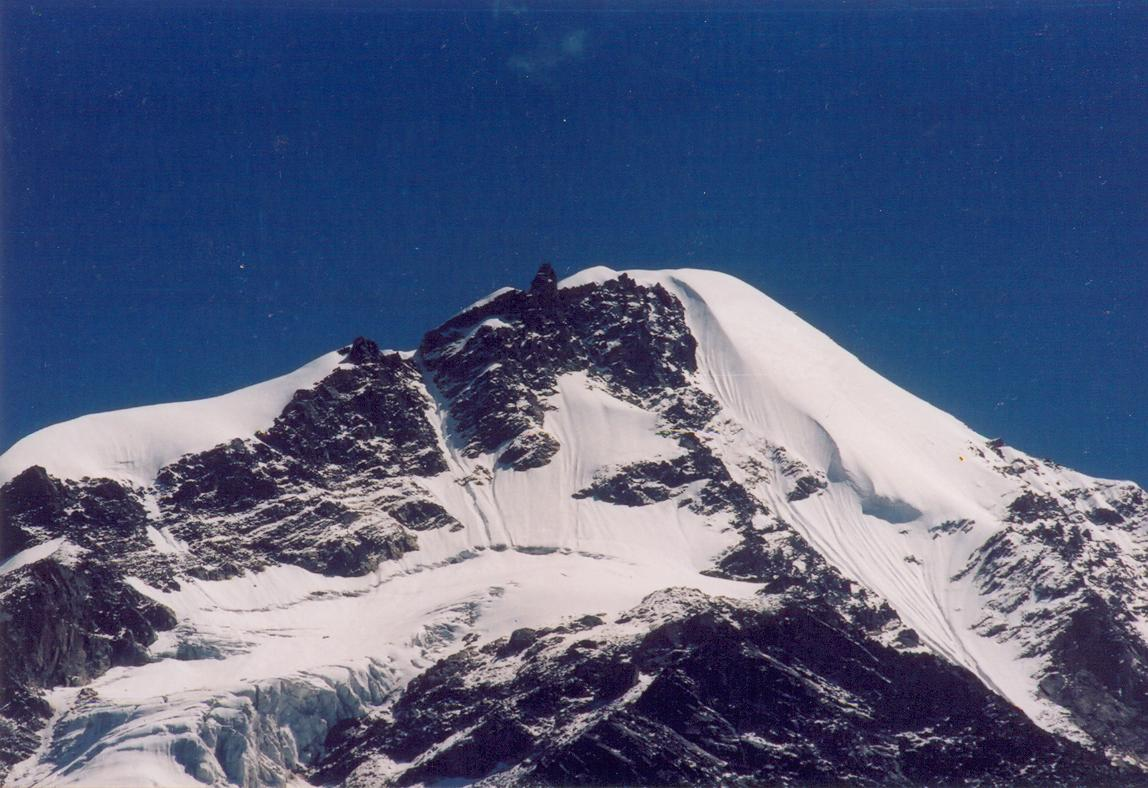
Himalayan peak

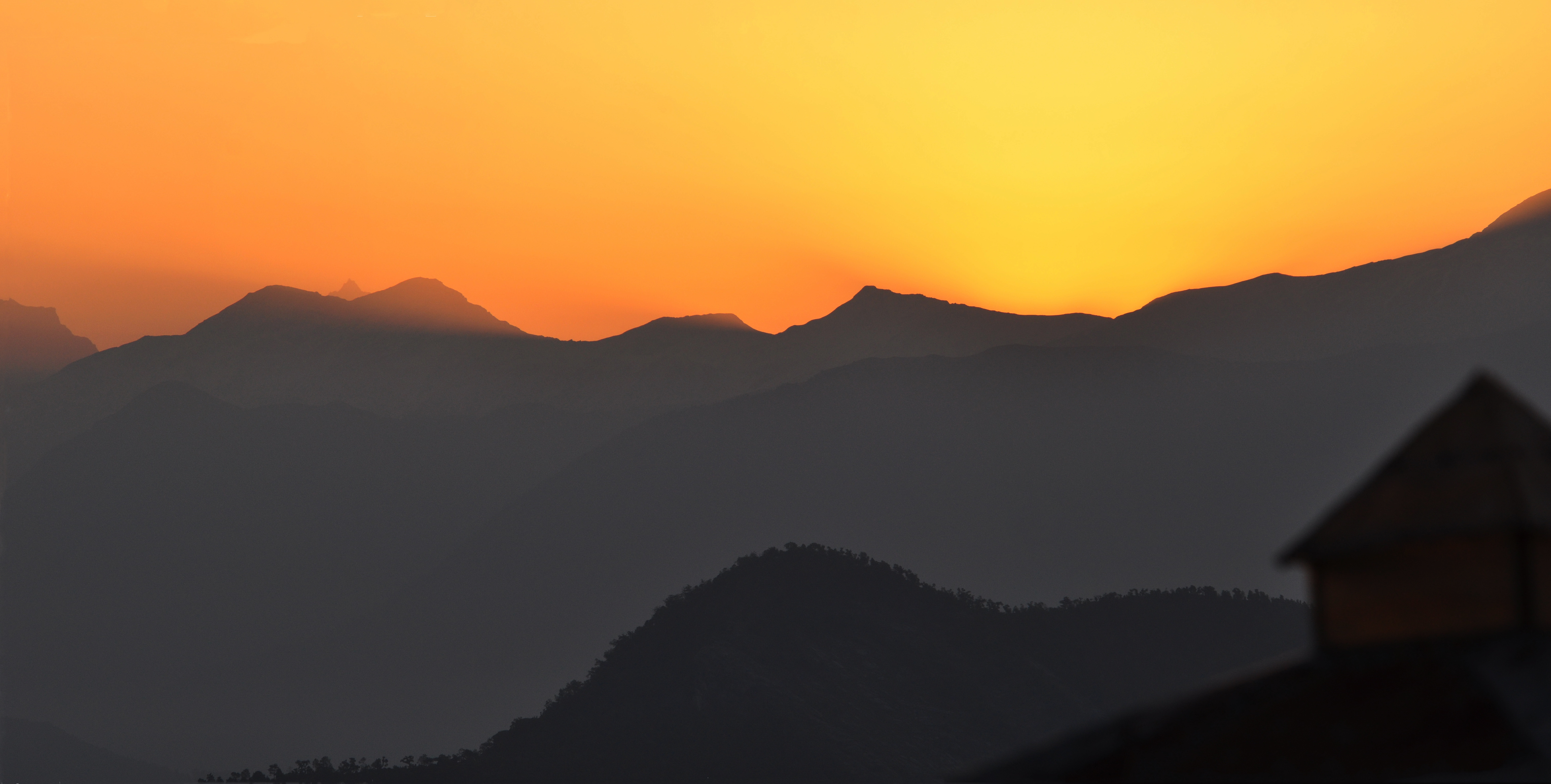
Sunset View from Chaukori

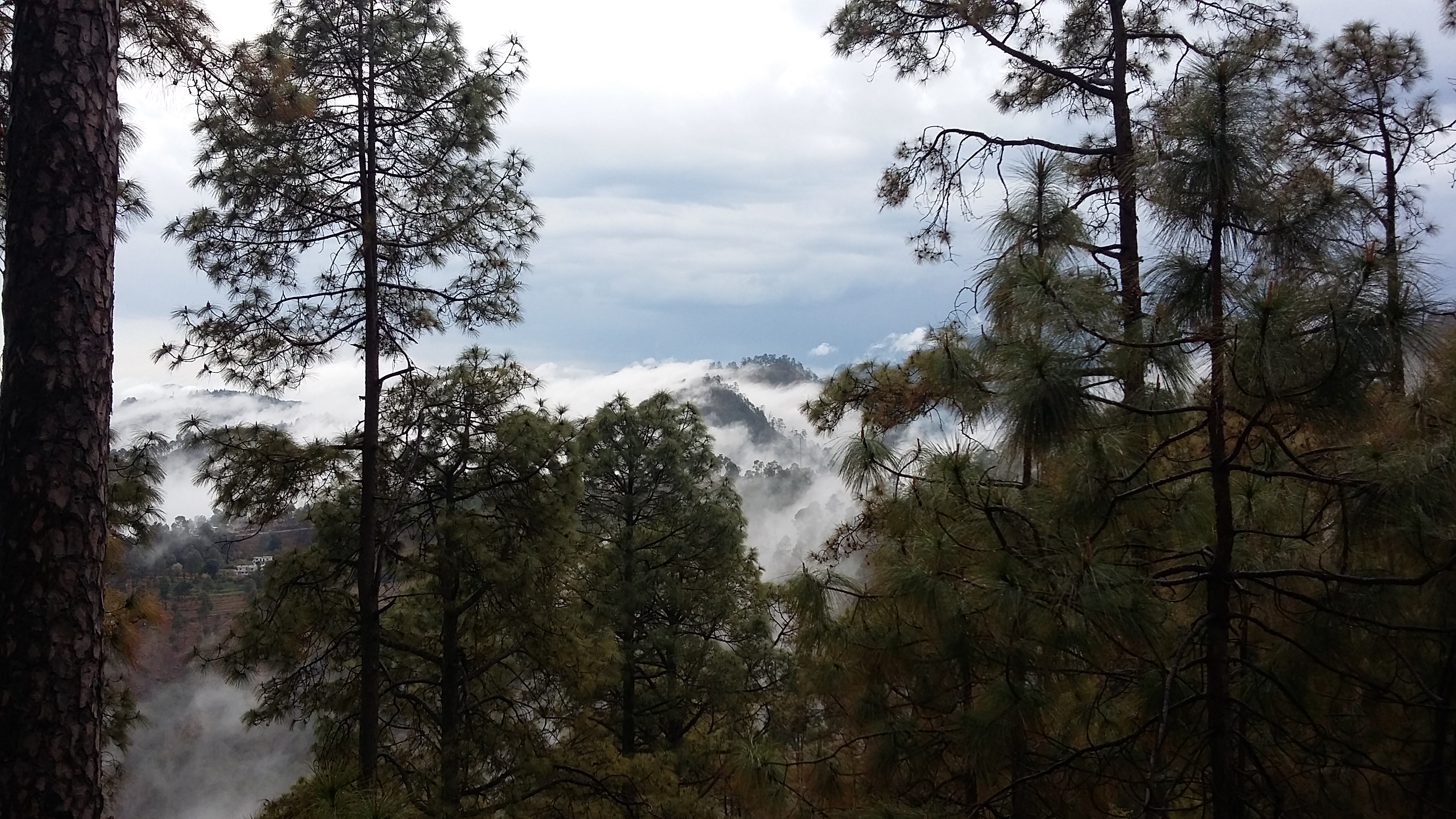
Pine forest in Chaukori

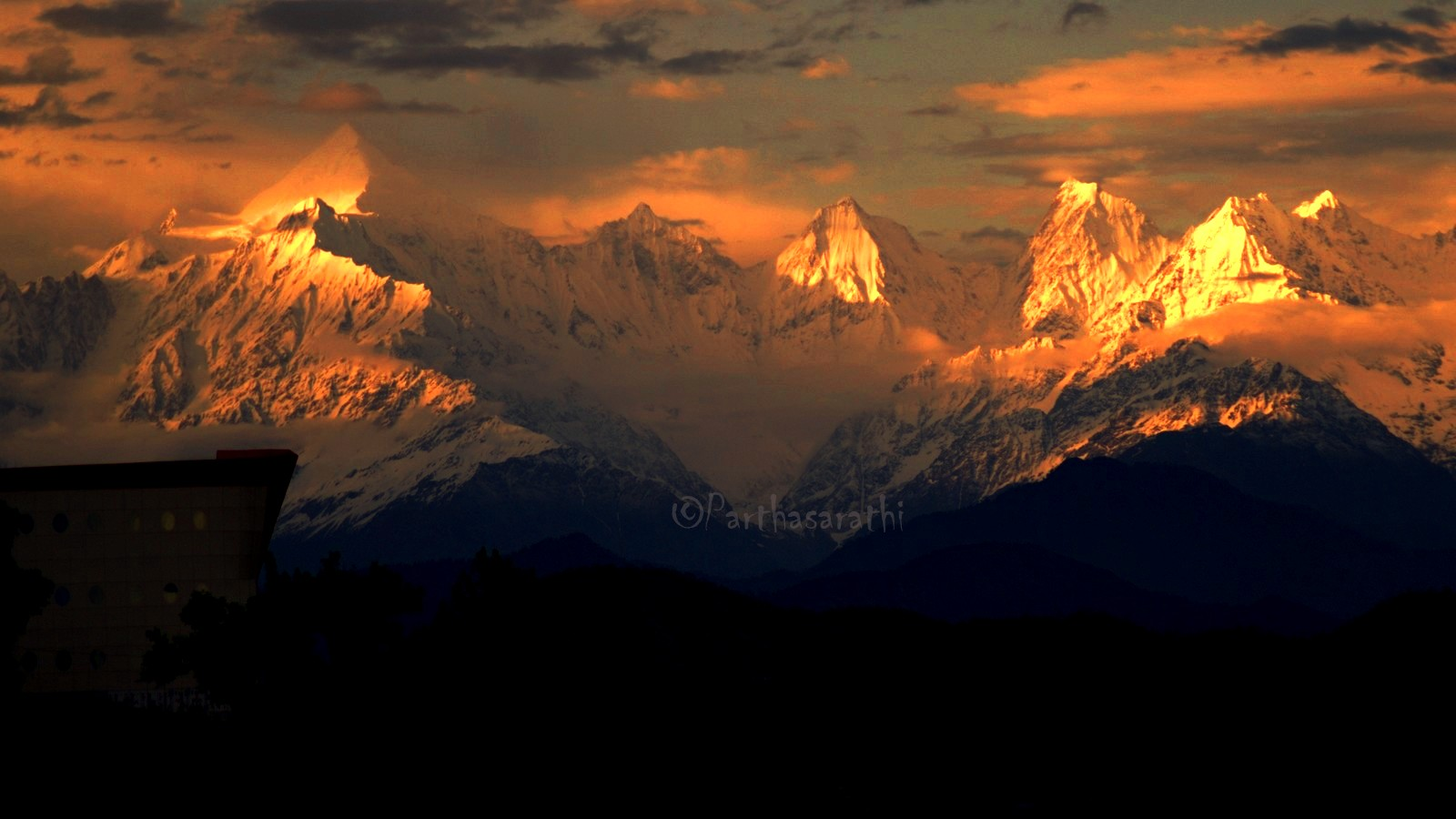
Panchchuli peaks at Sunset in 2014 from Chaukori

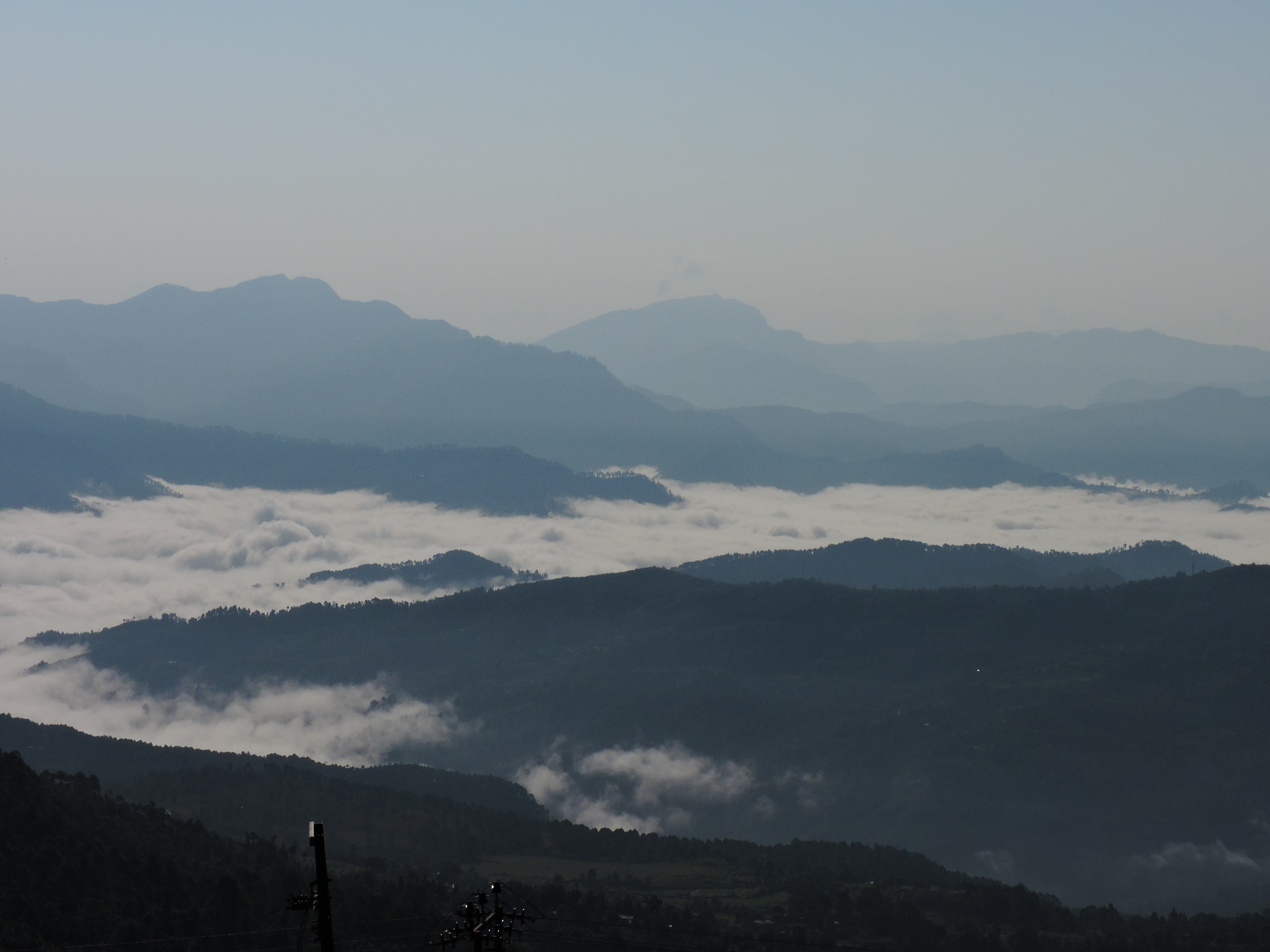
river of cloud at Chaukori
