= Dwarahat Assembly constituency =

Constituency of the Uttarakhand legislative assembly in India

Coordinates: 29.78°N 79.43°E

Dwarahat
- Constituency No. 48 for the Uttarakhand Legislative Assembly

Constituency details
- Country: India
- Region: North India
- State: Uttarakhand
- District: Almora
- Lok Sabha constituency: Almora
- Total electors: 92,567
- Reservation: None

Member of Legislative Assembly
- 5th Uttarakhand Legislative Assembly
- Incumbent Madan Singh Bisht
- Party: Indian National Congress
- Elected year: 2022

Dwarahat Legislative Assembly constituency is one of the 70 Legislative Assembly constituencies of Uttarakhand state in India.

It is part of Almora district.

== Member of the Legislative Assembly ==
| Year | Member | Party |
|---|---|---|
| 2002 | Bipin Chandra Tripathi | Uttarakhand Kranti Dal |
| 2004^ | Pushpesh Tripathi | Uttarakhand Kranti Dal |
| 2007 | Pushpesh Tripathi | Uttarakhand Kranti Dal |
| 2012 | Madan Singh Bisht | Indian National Congress |
| 2017 | Mahesh Singh Negi | Bharatiya Janata Party |
| 2022 | Madan Singh Bisht | Indian National Congress |

^ denotes bye election

== Election results ==
=== 2027 Assembly election ===
2027 Uttarakhand Legislative Assembly election: Dwarahat
| Party | Candidate | Votes | % | ±% |
|---|---|---|---|---|
| INC | | | | |
| BJP | | | | |
| NOTA | None of the above | | | |
| Majority | | | | |
| Turnout | | | | |
| gain from | | Swing | | |

=== Assembly Election 2022 ===
2022 Uttarakhand Legislative Assembly election: Dwarahat
| Party | Candidate | Votes | % | ±% |
|---|---|---|---|---|
| INC | Madan Singh Bisht | 17,766 | 36.19% | ▲7.17 |
| BJP | Anil Singh Shahi | 17,584 | 35.82% | ▼7.24 |
| UKD | Pushpesh Tripathi | 9,804 | 19.97% | ▲5.96 |
| Independent | Bhupal Singh Alias Pappu Bhandari | 1,138 | 2.32% | New |
| NOTA | None of the above | 791 | 1.61% | ▲0.34 |
| AAP | Prakash Chandra | 506 | 1.03% | New |
| Peoples Party of India (Democratic) | Dr. Pramod Kumar | 427 | 0.87% | New |
| BSP | Anand Ballabh | 354 | 0.72% | ▼1.05 |
| SP | Ganesh Chandra | 340 | 0.69% | New |
| Margin of victory | | 182 | 0.37% | ▼13.67 |
| Turnout | | 49,096 | 52.20% | ▲0.37 |
| Registered electors | | 94,056 | | ▲3.79 |
| INC gain from BJP | | Swing | ▼6.87 | |

=== Assembly Election 2017 ===
2017 Uttarakhand Legislative Assembly election: Dwarahat
| Party | Candidate | Votes | % | ±% |
|---|---|---|---|---|
| BJP | Mahesh Singh Negi | 20,221 | 43.06% | ▲17.65 |
| INC | Madan Singh Bisht | 13,628 | 29.02% | ▼4.87 |
| UKD | Pushpesh Tripathi | 6,581 | 14.01% | ▼12.26 |
| Independent | Kuber Singh Kathayat | 2,126 | 4.53% | New |
| Independent | Bhupal Singh Alias Pappu Bhandari | 1,196 | 2.55% | New |
| BSP | Girish Chaudhary | 830 | 1.77% | ▼2.82 |
| Independent | Nandan Giri | 776 | 1.65% | New |
| NOTA | None of the above | 597 | 1.27% | New |
| Bharat Ki Lok Jimmedar Party | Kundan Singh Rawat | 503 | 1.07% | New |
| Independent | Jay Prakash Kandpal | 342 | 0.73% | New |
| Margin of victory | | 6,593 | 14.04% | ▲6.42 |
| Turnout | | 46,963 | 51.82% | ▼0.05 |
| Registered electors | | 90,620 | | ▲7.66 |
| BJP gain from INC | | Swing | ▲9.17 | |

=== Assembly Election 2012 ===
2012 Uttarakhand Legislative Assembly election: Dwarahat
| Party | Candidate | Votes | % | ±% |
|---|---|---|---|---|
| INC | Madan Singh Bisht | 14,798 | 33.89% | ▲13.59 |
| UKD | Pushpesh Tripathi | 11,472 | 26.27% | ▼2.28 |
| BJP | Narendra Singh | 11,096 | 25.41% | ▲3.42 |
| BSP | Pramod Kumar | 2,004 | 4.59% | ▲0.62 |
| Independent | Rajendra Singh | 1,152 | 2.64% | New |
| UKPP | P. C. Tewari | 1,066 | 2.44% | New |
| Independent | Birendra Singh Bajetha | 675 | 1.55% | New |
| Independent | Devi Dutt Joshi | 458 | 1.05% | New |
| Independent | Pawan Chandra Pandey | 430 | 0.98% | New |
| URM | Vipin Chandra | 425 | 0.97% | New |
| Margin of victory | | 3,326 | 7.62% | ▲1.06 |
| Turnout | | 43,666 | 51.88% | ▼6.77 |
| Registered electors | | 84,170 | | ▲26.65 |
| INC gain from UKD | | Swing | ▲5.34 | |

=== Assembly Election 2007 ===
2007 Uttarakhand Legislative Assembly election: Dwarahat
| Party | Candidate | Votes | % | ±% |
|---|---|---|---|---|
| UKD | Pushpesh Tripathi | 11,128 | 28.55% | ▼13.53 |
| BJP | Sadanand | 8,573 | 21.99% | ▲8.12 |
| Independent | Madan Singh Bisht | 8,184 | 21.00% | New |
| INC | Mahesh Singh | 7,912 | 20.30% | ▼5.66 |
| BSP | Kamal Kishor | 1,549 | 3.97% | ▲2.08 |
| JD(U) | Nandan Giri | 1,116 | 2.86% | New |
| SP | Puran Chandra | 516 | 1.32% | ▼0.99 |
| Margin of victory | | 2,555 | 6.55% | ▼9.72 |
| Turnout | | 38,978 | 58.70% | ▲9.49 |
| Registered electors | | 66,459 | | ▲3.63 |
| UKD hold | | Swing | ▼13.53 | |

=== Dwarahat Assembly By-election 2004 ===
2004 Uttarakhand Legislative Assembly by-election : Dwarahat
| Party | Candidate | Votes | % | ±% |
|---|---|---|---|---|
| UKD | Pushpesh Tripathi | 13,224 | 42.08% | ▲5.09 |
| INC | Mahesh Singh | 8,160 | 25.96% | ▲2.29 |
| BJP | Mohan Singh Adhikari | 4,359 | 13.87% | ▼7.75 |
| Independent | Jagat Singh Negi | 2,599 | 8.27% | New |
| Independent | Prakash Chandra | 1,105 | 3.52% | New |
| SP | Chani Ram | 726 | 2.31% | ▲0.32 |
| Independent | Pramod Kumar | 661 | 2.10% | New |
| BSP | Viond Kumar | 595 | 1.89% | ▼8.67 |
| Margin of victory | | 5,064 | 16.12% | ▲2.80 |
| Turnout | | 31,429 | 48.98% | ▼0.21 |
| Registered electors | | 64,125 | | ▲4.67 |
| UKD hold | | Swing | ▲5.09 | |

=== Assembly Election 2002 ===
2002 Uttaranchal Legislative Assembly election: Dwarahat
| Party | Candidate | Votes | % | ±% |
|---|---|---|---|---|
| UKD | Bipin Chandra Tripathi | 11,114 | 36.99% | New |
| INC | Puran Chandra | 7,112 | 23.67% | New |
| BJP | Balwant Singh | 6,495 | 21.62% | New |
| BSP | Lalit Mohan Joshi | 3,173 | 10.56% | New |
| Independent | Lalit Mohan | 946 | 3.15% | New |
| Uttarakhand Janwadi Party | Hira Singh Thapa | 610 | 2.03% | New |
| SP | Pratap Singh | 598 | 1.99% | New |
| Margin of victory | | 4,002 | 13.32% | |
| Turnout | | 30,048 | 49.19% | |
| Registered electors | | 61,128 | | |
| UKD win (new seat) | | | | |

== See also ==
- List of constituencies of the Uttarakhand Legislative Assembly
- Almora district
