= Madan Singh Bisht =

Indian politician (born 1963)

Madan Singh Bisht (born 1963) is an Indian politician from Uttarakhand. He is an MLA from Dwarahat Assembly constituency in Almora district. He won the 2022 Uttarakhand Legislative Assembly election representing the Indian National Congress.

== Early life and education ==
Bisht is from Dwarahat, Almora district, Uttarakhand. He is the son of the late Hukum Singh Bisht. He completed his L.L.B. in 1992 at Delhi University. Earlier, he did B.Com. in 1984.

== Personal life ==
Madan Singh Bisht was married. His wife, Uma was also a politician. Uma Bisht died in 2025, at the age of 58.

== Career ==
Bisht won from Dwarahat Assembly constituency representing the Indian National Congress in the 2022 Uttarakhand Legislative Assembly election. He polled 17,766 votes and defeated his nearest rival, Anil Shahi of Bharatiya Janata Party, by a narrow margin of 162 votes. Earlier, he lost the 2017 Uttarakhand Legislative Assembly election to Mahesh Singh Negi of Bharatiya Janata Party by a margin of 6,593 votes. He became an MLA for the first time winning the 2012 Uttarakhand Legislative Assembly election defeating Pushpesh Tripathi of Uttarakhand Kranti Dal by a margin of 3,326 votes. He contested his first election in 2007 as an independent candidate and lost to Pushpesh Tripathi of Uttarakhand Kranti Dal by a margin of 2,944 votes, finishing third behind the Bharatiya Janata Party candidate Sadanand.
