= NH 109 =

NH 109 may refer to:

- National Highway 109 (India)
- New Hampshire Route 109, United States
