= National Highway 309B (India) =

National highway in India

National Highway 309B
- Map of the National Highway in red

Route information
- Length: 82 km (51 mi)

Major junctions
- West end: Almora
- East end: Rameshwar

Location
- Country: India
- States: Uttarakhand

Highway system
- Roads in India; Expressways; National; State; Asian
← NH 109	→ NH 9

National Highway 309B, commonly referred to as NH 309B is a national highway in India. It is a spur road of National Highway 9. NH-309B traverses the state of Uttarakhand in India.

== Route ==
Almora - Panar near Rameshwar.

== Junctions ==
NH 109 Terminal near Almora.
NH 9 at Panar near Rameshwar.

== See also ==
- List of national highways in India
- List of national highways in India by state
