= Mehalchauri =

- Village
- Location within Uttarakhand Mehalchauri (India)
- Coordinates: 29.9838°N 79.3223°E
- Country: India
- State: Uttarakhand
- District: Chamoli
- Tehsil: Gairsain
- Elevation: 1,350 m (4,430 ft)

Demographics
  - Languages: Hindi
  - Sex ratio: 1000 : 926
  - Literacy rate: 60%
- Time zone: UTC+5:30 (IST)
- Pincode: 246431
- Telephone code: 01363
- ISO 3166 code: IN-UT
- Vehicle registration: UK 11
- River: Ram Ganga
- Temperature: 25-30 °C
- Website: www.uttrakhandhub.in

Mehalchauri (Garhwali: Melchōrí) is a village in Gairsain Tehsil located in Chamoli district in the Indian state of Uttarakhand. It is situated in Garhwal division nearby the center of the Garhwal and Kumaon divisions.

Mehalchauri is 1,350 metres (4,430 ft) above sea level and is the source of the Ramganga River. It is located 125 km from the state capital of Dehradun. It is a religious place and the main market for the villages of Harshari, Pharso, Aagarchatti, Latoogair, Malkot, Kalamati, Maithan, and many others. The RamGanga Pul bridge was built in 1963 and connects Chaukhuttiya and Maithan Road to Gairsain.

According to an old tale, the name Mehalchauri comes from the Garhwali language, mehal meaning "little" and chauri meaning the mehal is situated in chauraha, a valley.

== Temples ==
Nearby Temples include Bhairavgadhi in Pandwakhal, Hanuman Mandir in Mehalchauri, Jhankaar in Latoogair and Shivalay in Dhoonarghat.

Nearby towns are Gairsain (12 km), Maithan (18 km), Chaukhuttiya (22 km), Dewal (6.5 km), Tharali (20.5 km), Karnaprayag (60 km) and Ghat (29 km).

== Infrastructure ==
Mehalchauri is about 5 km from the Almora border at the National Highway 87 extension. The nearest railway station to Mehalchauri is Ramnagar, which is 175 km (108.74 Miles) and Haldwani which is 160 km (99.4 Miles) away. The nearest airport is Gaucher, about 54 km (33.55 Miles) away.

== Demography ==
No. of households: 150 (000?)

Total population: 500 (000?); male 32, female 25

Sex ratio: 70 females per 100 males

Literacy rate: 80.39%; male 96.29%, female 62.5%
