= Gairsain =

- Location in Uttarakhand, India Gairsain (India)
- Coordinates: 30.0725°N 79.2856°E
- Country: India
- State: Uttarakhand
- District: Chamoli

Area
  - Total: 7.53 km^{2} (2.91 sq mi)
- Elevation: 1,650 m (5,410 ft)

Population (2011)
  - Total: 7,138
  - Density: 948/km^{2} (2,460/sq mi)

Languages
  - Official: Hindi, Sanskrit
  - Native: Garhwali
- Time zone: UTC+5:30 (IST)
- PIN: 246428
- Telephone code: 01363
- Vehicle registration: UK-11
- Sex ratio: 1000 / 926 ♂/♀
- Literacy: 75%
- Lok Sabha constituency: Garhwal
- Vidhan Sabha constituency: Karnaprayag
- Climate: Cwb (Köppen)
- Website: chamoli.gov.in

Gairsain (Hindustani: [ɡɛːrˈsɛːɳ]) is a town in Chamoli district of the Indian state of Uttarakhand near state's summer capital Bhararisain. A town and Nagar Panchayat, Gairsain is situated at the eastern edge of the vast Dudhatoli mountain range, and is located in Chamoli district almost at the centre of the state, at a distance of approximately 250 kilometres from Dehradun. It is easily accessible from both the Garhwal and the Kumaon divisions, and in a way, acts as the bridge between the two regions. It is being considered as the future Permanent capital of Uttarakhand.

Gairsain was envisaged as the state capital during the statehood agitation. However, after the formation of the state on 9 November 2000, Dehradun was made the temporary capital of the state. The Government of Uttarakhand had constituted the Dixit Commission for the search of a permanent capital; but the commission in its report had noted that "the interim capital, Dehradun, is a more suitable place as the permanent capital owing to the factors like its distance from national capital, centralised population and safety from natural calamities". A three-day-long assembly session of Uttarakhand Legislative Assembly was held at Gairsain from 9 to 12 June 2014. With this event, hopes are high that its stature might be raised to that of the permanent capital of the state, in the near future.

== Etymology ==
According to tradition, the name Gairsain is derived from the Garhwali words; Gair (गैर) meaning 'at some depth' and Sain (सैण) meaning 'rolling plains', referring to the somewhat flat land at some depth in otherwise hilly terrain. An adjoining village is named Gair (गैड़) and some attribute the name Gairsain as the deep plain area at the foot of Gair Village.

== History ==
=== Ancient history ===
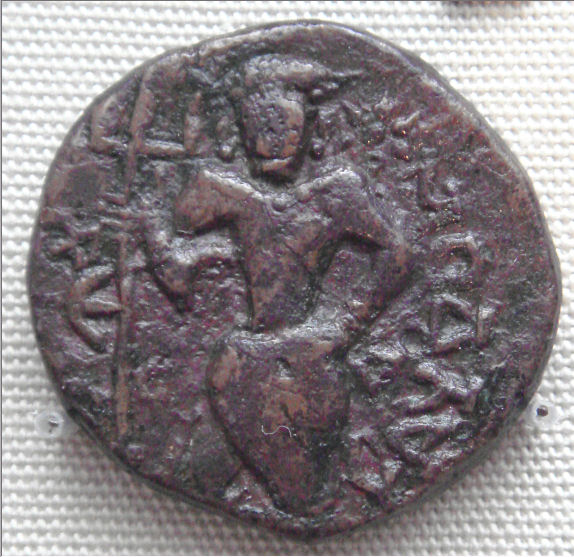
Coin of King Amogh, a ruler of the Kuninda Kingdom, c. 2nd century BCE

In the ancient Indian literature, this area has been celebrated as Kedar Kshetra. The other tradition envisages that Himalayan country is said to be made up of five divisions one of which is Kedar Khanda which has been specifically dealt within the Kedar Khand section of Skand Puran. The Kunindas and Kiratas are also reported to have been inhabitants of this region. According to Hindu tradition the earliest King of this area seems to have been Kubera, the Lord of Yakshas. They were suppressed by Asuras who seem to have principally ruled over what is now Ukhimath. Prithu appears to have been the first King from the plains to visit these parts. After the Mahabharata War, Nagas, Kunindas, Kiratas, Tanganas and Khasas exercised control over this region. For more than a century the area fell under the empire of Kushanas and later on under the sway of Shilvarman, a powerful king who styled himself lord of the mountains. In course of time the Katyuri dynasty became a virtually indigenous ruling family of this region. Katyuri Kings ruled the present area from 9th to 11th centuries. The Katyuris were replaced by Chand Kings in Kumaon, while Garhwal was fragmented into several small principalities. Huen Tsang, the Chinese traveller, who visited the region around 629 AD, mentions a kingdom of Brahampura in the region.

Gairsain remained under the sway of Parmar Rajputs of Garhwal during the Medivial period. The Garhwal state was founded in 823 AD, when Kanakpal, the prince of Malwa, on his visit to the Badrinath Temple, met the King Bhanu Pratap, a chieftain of Chandpur Garhi. The King later married his only daughter to the prince and subsequently handed over his kingdom, the fortress town. Kanakpal and his descendants of Parmar dynasty, gradually conquered all the independent fortresses (Garhs) belonging to its 52 small chieftains, and ruled the whole of Garhwal Kingdom for the next 915 years, up to 1804 AD. In 1358, the 37th ruler, Ajay Pal, brought all the minor principalities for the Garhwal region, under his own rule, and founded the Garhwal Kingdom, with Devalgarh as its capital, which he later shifted to Srinagar.

At the beginning of the 18th century, the bulk of this area was included in the domain of Fateh Shah, the Raja of Garhwal. He was followed by Dilip Sah, Upendra Sah and Pradeep Sah for over half a century. In the beginning of 1803, a severe earthquake occurred in Garhwal, destroying many houses and killing many people and cattle. Soon after this the Gorkha leaders Amar Singh Thapa, Hastidal Chutariya and some others invaded Garhwal with a large and well equipped army. Amar Singh Thapa was appointed Governor of the region. The Gorkhas were defeated by the British forces in the Anglo-Nepalese War of 1814, and Gairsain along with other parts of Kumaon and Garhwal was ceded to the British in the Treaty of Sugauli. In 1839 the district of Garhwal came into existence after being separated from the Kumaon District. In 1919, this area came into prominence as a centre of political activity under the leadership of Anusuya Prasad Bahuguna, a leader who held public meetings against coolie-begar system. In 1930 the civil disobedience movement was made one occasion for launching individual Satyagraha against British Government. In 1947 the area along with rest of country won independence from British rule when it was part of the district British Garhwal also called Pauri Garhwal.

=== Founding ===
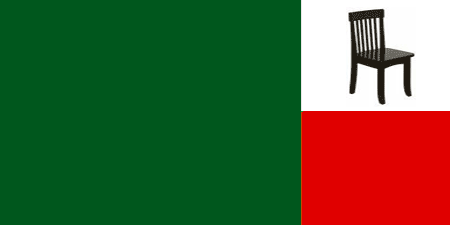
During the statehood movement, Uttarakhand Kranti Dal formally declared Gairsain as the capital of the proposed state of Uttarakhand in 1992.

Veer Chandra Singh Garhwali was the first person to propose Gairsain as the capital of a hill state in the 1960s. This place eventually began to be projected as the capital of the proposed state during the Uttarakhand state movement. In 1989, Dr. D.D. Pant and Bipin Tripathi accepted Gairsain as the proposed capital of Uttarakhand. An office of Directorate of Higher Education and Diet was inaugurated in Gairsain in 1991. The same year, three BJP ministers and MLAs supported the demand of a separate Uttarakhand state in a public meeting held in the town. The Uttarakhand Kranti Dal, in the year 1992, formally declared Gairsain as the capital of the proposed state of Uttarakhand. UKD, In the honour of Veer Chandra Singh Garhwali, named this proposed capital region as Chandranagar. A hunger strike, which lasted for 157 days, was organised in the year 1994 in order to pressurise the government to announce Gairsain as the capital of Uttarakhand. The same year, a committee headed by Ramashankar Kaushik, which was constituted by then Mulayam Singh Yadav Government, recommended the creation of the hill state of Uttarakhand with Gairsain as its capital.

After the formation of Uttarakhand on 9 November 2000, the demand for declaring Gairsain as the state capital started rising across the state. In 2000, the Uttarakhand Mahila Morcha took out a rally demanding Gairsain be made the state capital. Several public demonstrations followed this rally, and in a similar event held in Srinagar in 2002, the Gairsain Rajdhani Aandolana Samiti (Gairsain Capital Movement Committee) was established. Taking these movements into consideration, the Uttarakhand government constituted the Dikshit Commission under the chairmanship of Justice V. N. Dixit, whose work was to carry out a study among various cities of Uttarakhand, in order to find the most suitable place for the capital of Uttarakhand. The Dikshit Commission narrowed down the search to 5 cities: Dehradun, Kashipur, Ramnagar, Rishikesh and Gairsain; and after taking 8 years, submitted its 80-page report to the Uttarakhand Assembly on 17 August 2008. The commission found Dehradun and Kashipur eligible for the capital, noting "the interim capital, Dehradun, is a more suitable place as the permanent capital owing to the factors like its distance from national capital, centralised population and safety from natural calamities" and considering the odd geographical conditions, seismic data and other factors, disfavoured Gairsain as the permanent capital. Although, the whole state, baring plains, is in Seismic Zone-5

In 2012, the then Chief Minister of Uttarakhand, Vijay Bahuguna organized a cabinet meeting in Gairsain. After the success of this meeting, the foundation stone of a new building for the Uttarakhand Assembly was set in the GIC Ground in the year 2013. The same year, Bhoomi Poojan Program was organized for the Vidhan Sabha Bhavan in Bhararisain, located about 14 km away from Gairsain. A three-day session of the Uttarakhand assembly was organized for the first time in this assembly building that was completed in 2014. In May 2014, a decision was taken by Uttarakhand government to constitute 'Gairsain Development Council' by merging the blocks of Gairsain in Chamoli and Chaukhutia in Almora, and by the end of the year, there were plans to develop Gairsain as the Summer capital of Uttarakhand.

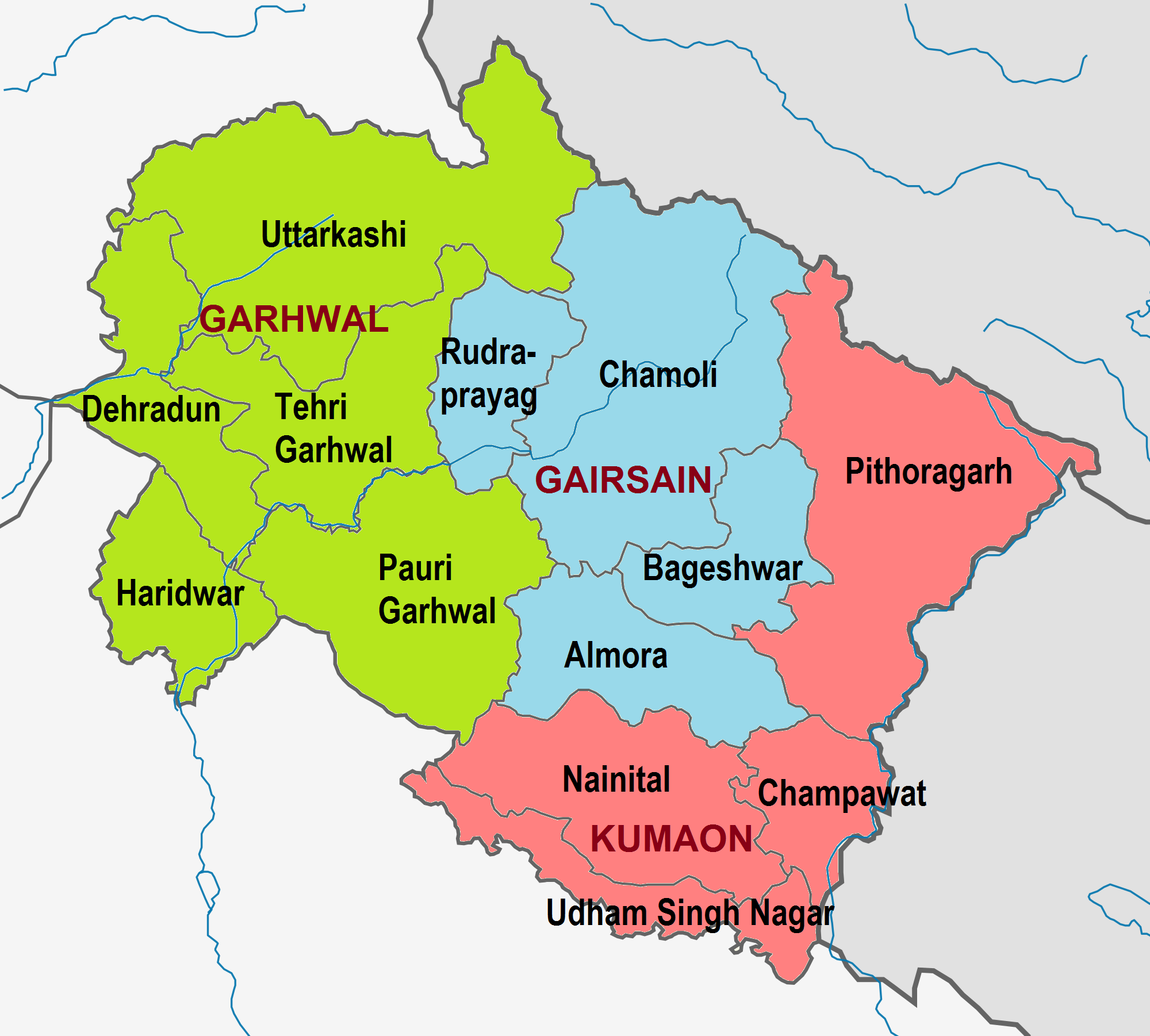
Gairsain Division (Shown in Blue) was proposed to be the third administrative division of the state after Garhwal and Kumaon

Gairsain was given the status of a Nagar Panchayat in 2015–2016. At the time of its establishment, the city was spread over an area of 7.53 sq. km, and had a population of 7,138 according to the 2011 Census of India. The proposal to develop Gairsain as the Summer capital of the state gained much acceptance by 2017. Another session of the Uttarakhand Cabinet was held in Gairsain in 2017 and the following year, the state government decided to set up an integrated township at Bhararisain. The entire complex was proposed to be developed on the green city concept, which would be equipped with several modern facilities on its sprawling campus including "residential apartments and commercial complexes, dispensaries, and schools, besides parks and playgrounds for children and youth".

On 4 March 2020, the chief minister of Uttarakhand, Trivendra Singh Rawat announced in the Legislative Assembly of the state during budget session that Bhararisain (14 km from Gairsain) would be declared the summer Capital of the state. An official notification to this effect was issued on 8 June 2020 by the government after the then governor, Baby Rani Maurya gave her assent to the move. The Gairsain division was announced in March 2021. It was proposed to be the third administrative division of the state after Garhwal and Kumaon, and would include the districts of Almora, Bageshwar, Chamoli and Rudraprayag. However, the status was put on 'hold' by Uttarakhand Cabinet in April 2021.

== Geography ==
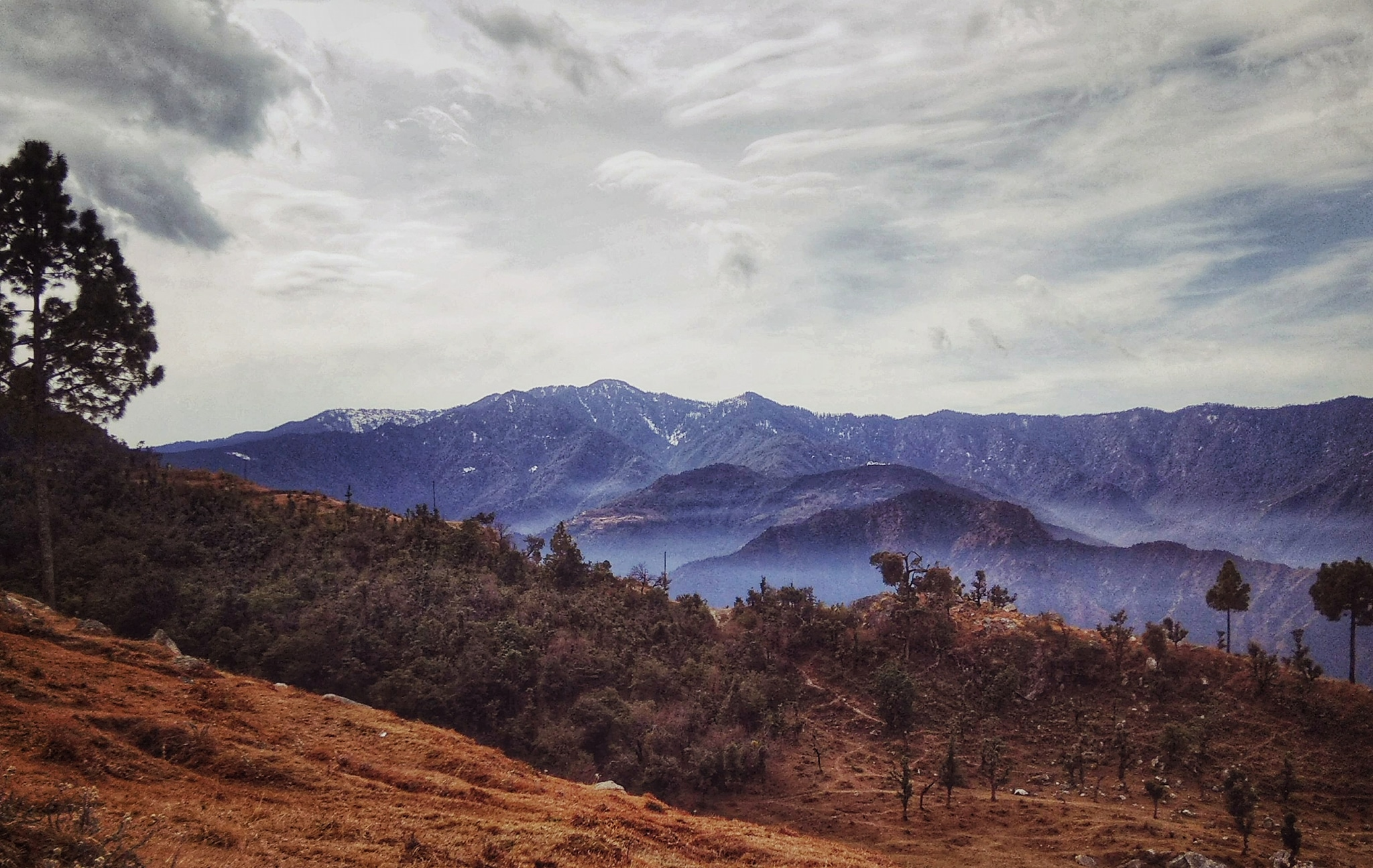
View of snowfall in Dudhatoli hills, as seen from Gairsain

Gairsain is just about 16 km from the Almora district border along National Highway 87. The nearest railway station to Gairsain is Ramnagar which is 150 km away. The nearest airport is Gauchar Airport, at Gauchar which is approximately 54 km.

=== Location ===
The town of Gairsain is situated in Chamoli District of Uttarakhand in North India. The town is located at 30.05°N 79.28°E and has an average altitude of 1,650 metres (5,410 ft). The town is 260 km north-east of Dehradun, 170 km south of Badrinath, 140 km north-west of Nainital and approximately 450 km north-east of New Delhi. Gairsain is situated in the center of the state; although it comes within the administrative limits of the Garhwal division, the boundary of Kumaon division starts approximately 15 kilometers from the town. The town is located on the mountains of the Dudhatoli range, and forms its western limit.

Gairsain is also the headquarter of the Gairsain Tehsil – one of the six district subdivisions of Chamoli district. The Gairsain Tehsil is spread over an area of 501 square kilometres (193 sq mi) and is bound by the Karnaprayag Tehsil on its North, Tharali Tehsil on its East, Chaukhutia Tehsil of Almora district on its south and Thalisain Tehsil of Pauri Garhwal district on its West.

=== Topography ===
Gairsain has an unusually gentle topography compared to the other areas of equivalent altitude in the Garhwal region. The slope of the land in the lower regions or 'khet' is around 30 degrees while along the higher slopes it is around 40 degrees. According to the Bureau of Indian Standards, the town falls under seismic zone 5, in a scale of 2 to 5 (in order of increasing vulnerability to earthquakes). The source of the Ramganga River, "Diwali Khal", is located near the town; The river flows besides the town, although at a much lower height from it. Gairsain comes under the Ramganga Soil Conservation Project that was initiated to contain the advancement of siltation in the Kalagarh dam. This project, covering the catchment area of the streams feeding the dam, has its head offices located in Ranikhet.

Gairsain is located along an anticlinal thrust plane of the Almora nappe. Construction material like granite, gneisses, slates tiles, and limestone, quartzite is found around the town. The types of soil found here are generally the same as found in the hilly areas comprising gravel sand, sandy loam, clayey loam, heavy clay and calcareous soils. The soils maybe divided into 3 categories. One is the red soil found on the slopes and generally sandy is grayish brown when dry and reddish when moist. The brown soils, found in the forests and fields near the town, varies in colour from brown to dark brown depending on the quantity of organic matter contained therein. The podsol soils, clayey in texture, are generally found along the terraced fields.

=== Climate ===
Gairsain has a subtropical highland climate (Cwb) under the Köppen climate classification. The city is situated at an elevation of 1650 metres, and as a result, the climate of the area is largely dependent on its high altitude. The annual average range of temperature is around 15 °C. In summers the maximum temperature is around 26 °C while the minimum temperature is around 16 °C. The winter temperature, however, hovers between 12 and 7 °C. Skies are heavily clouded during the monsoon months and for short spells when the region is affected by the passage of western disturbances. During the rest of the year the skies are generally clear to lightly clouded. There is snowfall in the months of January and February. The snowfall is usually between 5 and 120 cm, and the snow accumulates for a day or two.

The average annual rainfall occurring in the town is 1435 mm. Most of the rainfall occurs during the period between June and September when 70 to 80 percent of the annual precipitation is accounted for. Its location on the southern slopes of the outer Himalayas allows the monsoon currents to enter through the valley. The effectiveness of the rains is, among others, related to low temperature which means less evapotranspiration from the surrounding forests and vegetation cover – indicating that the soil moisture in the area is well preserved. The relative humidity is moderately high during the monsoon season around 60 percent but the unpleasant effect is offset by the winds which make it less oppressive. During the winter months the humidity increases towards the afternoon generally. The driest part of the year is the pre monsoon period when the humidity may drop to 35 percent during the afternoon.

Climate data for Gairsain
| Month | Jan | Feb | Mar | Apr | May | Jun | Jul | Aug | Sep | Oct | Nov | Dec | Year |
|---|---|---|---|---|---|---|---|---|---|---|---|---|---|
| Mean daily maximum °C (°F) | 12.5 (54.5) | 14.8 (58.6) | 19.3 (66.7) | 24.5 (76.1) | 27.8 (82.0) | 26.7 (80.1) | 23.4 (74.1) | 23.0 (73.4) | 22.8 (73.0) | 21.3 (70.3) | 17.8 (64.0) | 14.4 (57.9) | 20.7 (69.2) |
| Daily mean °C (°F) | 7.7 (45.9) | 9.4 (48.9) | 13.6 (56.5) | 18.0 (64.4) | 21.4 (70.5) | 21.5 (70.7) | 19.9 (67.8) | 19.7 (67.5) | 18.9 (66.0) | 16.2 (61.2) | 12.6 (54.7) | 9.4 (48.9) | 15.7 (60.3) |
| Mean daily minimum °C (°F) | 3.0 (37.4) | 4.1 (39.4) | 8.0 (46.4) | 11.6 (52.9) | 15.0 (59.0) | 16.4 (61.5) | 16.5 (61.7) | 16.4 (61.5) | 15.1 (59.2) | 11.2 (52.2) | 7.4 (45.3) | 4.5 (40.1) | 10.8 (51.4) |
| Average rainfall mm (inches) | 74 (2.9) | 63 (2.5) | 63 (2.5) | 25 (1.0) | 48 (1.9) | 168 (6.6) | 389 (15.3) | 309 (12.2) | 174 (6.9) | 83 (3.3) | 9 (0.4) | 30 (1.2) | 1,435 (56.7) |
Source: Climate-Data.org

== Demographics ==
Historical population
| Year | Pop. | ±% |
|---|---|---|
| 1981 | 2,895 | — |
| 1991 | 4,228 | +46.0% |
| 2001 | 6,258 | +48.0% |
| 2011 | 7,138 | +14.1% |

According to the 2011 census of India, Gairsain town is spread over an area of 7.53 sq. km, and the total population residing in the town is 7,138, which gives it population density of 947.94 persons per square kilometer of area, which is greater than the state ratio of 189 people per square kilometer. The number of men in the city is 3,582 while the number of women is 3,556, which gives it a sex ratio of 100.73%. Literacy rate of the town is 87.27 percent. Gairsain, initially a small hamlet, had a recorded population of 2,895 in 1981. The population subsequently rose to 4,228 in 1991 and 6,258 in 2001.

== Governance ==
Ex-Chief Minister Vijay Bahuguna promised to undertake numerous developmental projects in Gairsain, during his first visit to the town. He promised that an airstrip would be laid in Gairsain. In addition, one session of the legislative assembly will be held annually in Gairsain.

A session of Uttarakhand Legislative Assembly was held on 17 and 18 November 2016 for the first time in the newly constructed, grand Uttarakhand Legislative Assembly building at Bhararisain, some 14 km away from Gairsain. Many important legislations were passed during the session. The assembly also resolved to hold the next budget session at Bhararisain.

A Vidhan Sabha complex was built at Bhararisain, around 14 km from the town. Covering 47 acres, the assembly building is estimated to have cost 150 crores. In the summer, officials travel from Dehradun along with documents to Bhararisain for the assembly session. The complex is kept closed during the snowy winters.

== Transport ==
Due to being located in a hilly area, Gairsain has neither rail connections nor a proper air connection, however, it is well connected by road. The nearest railhead is located in Ramnagar, which is approximately 150 km from Gairsain. Other nearby Railway stations include Kathgodam (160 km) and Kotdwara (245 km). A railway line connecting Karnaprayag with Rishikesh is under construction, and upon its completion, the Karnaprayag railway station (47 km) will be the nearest railway station to Gairsain. There have also been plans to link Chaukhutia to Ramnagar with a Rail line, which would be instrumental in bringing Gairsain on the Railway map. In May 2019, the Ministry of Railways sanctioned the survey of a new railway track which would connect Gairsain with Tanakpur, Bageshwar, Chaukhutiya, and Karnaprayag.

The nearby operational airports are located in Pantnagar, Pithoragarh and Dehradun at a distance of approximately 195, 240 and 260 kilometers respectively. An airstrip exists at Gauchar (55 km) but is used only during special occasions. Government is planning the development of an Airport at Chaukhutia, which is situated in Almora district at a distance of 35 km from Gairsain.

Gairsain is well connected by roads with all major cities in the state. National Highway 109 passes through the town, and connects with the cities of Haldwani, Almora, Ranikhet, Dwarahat and Karnaprayag. Private bus operators as well as state transport buses ply to and from the town. Taxi services are also available to destination like Chaukhutia, Ramnagar and other major towns and cities.

== Education ==
Gairsain has one Degree College – the Government Degree College Gairsain, which was established in 2001, and is affiliated to the Hemwati Nandan Bahuguna Garhwal University, Srinagar.

=== Degree college ===
PG college Gairsain is now affiliated with Sri dev Suman University Badshahithaul tehri; changes occurred by 2018 when many colleges that were affiliated with HNBGU were transferred to Sdsu. Now in Garhwal region of Uttarakhand it is the second-largest university for study.
