= Chaukhutia =

- Town
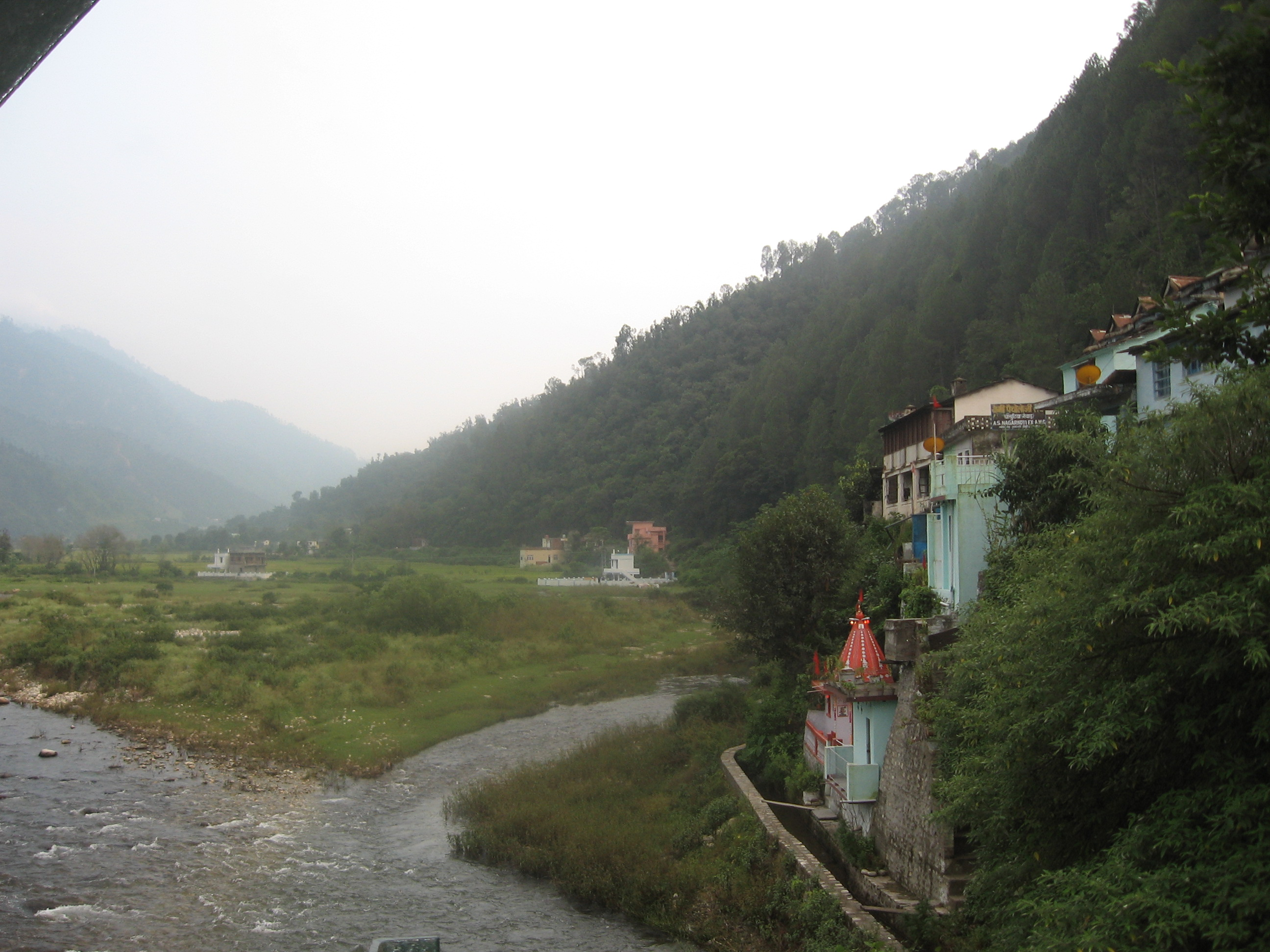
- Chaukhutia town along the banks of Ramganga; Picture from Chaukhutia bridge

- Location in Uttarakhand, India Chaukhutia (India)
- Coordinates: 29°53′05″N 79°21′05″E
- Country: India
- State: Uttarakhand
- Division: Kumaun
- District: Almora

Languages
  - Official: Hindi
- Time zone: UTC+5:30 (IST)
- Vehicle registration: UK 01
- Website: uk.gov.in

Chaukhutia is a town in Almora district of Uttarakhand. It is located on the bank of the river Ramganga, and derives its name from a Kumaoni word "Chau-khut" which means four feet. In Chaukhutia's context, 'four feet' means four ways or directions. The first way is towards Ramnagar, second towards Karanprayag, third towards Ranikhet and Almora and the fourth way is towards Tadagtaal, Kheera.

A group of small temples dating back to 9th century AD were found in Chaukhutia, during an excavation in 2016-17. The temples, according to traditions of the architecture, were constructed around 9000 years ago. Some of the temples didn't have roofs, but shivalingas inside the temples were still intact. These temples were considered to be a part of a large group of temples that were buried, perhaps, by debris of landslide long back.

== Temples and history ==
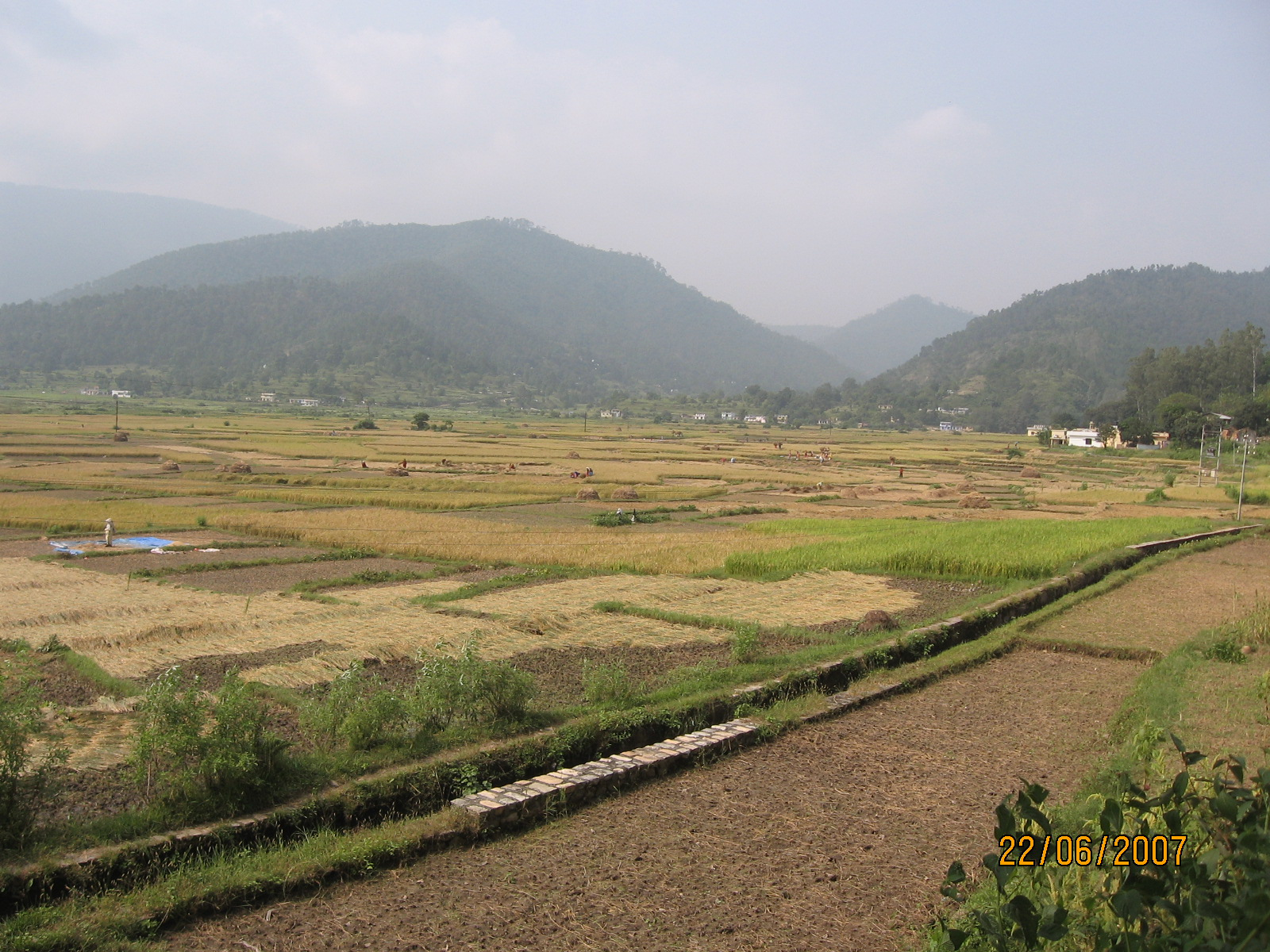
Vairat valley as seen from Chaukhutia-Maasi road

Kali Temple, known locally as Agneri Devi Temple, is dedicated to the Hindu Goddess Kali, and is situated around 0.5 kilometres from Chaukhutia, on Jaurasi road, near Dhudalia village on the bank of Ramganga River. Every year Ashtami Mela (a fair) is organised at the temple. Lakhanpur temple is 6 km from Chaukhutia in Jaurasi-Chaukhutia road. This temple belongs to the Katyuri kings. A small fair is also held here every year in October–November(near to Krishnajanmatmi). Vaishno Devi's temple and the ancient forts and ruins of Katyuri dynasty are also in the area.

This is also an agricultural valley, where rice, wheat and mangoes are grown. Nearby towns include Masi (13 km) and Dwarahat (22 km). Chaukhutia is also known as Vairaat. The story is that the present Chaukhutia was the capital of King Virata of Mahabharata. Pandav five brothers and their wives took that place, and when they were going to heaven for moksha they stayed in the area for a few days. Bheem washed her cloth in Tadagtaal Lake but when he was leaving the taal he mark four finger hole in taal (lake) so tadag river came from there. Which meets in ramganga (the Tadagtaal Lake is a pure place in Uttarakhand). This is smaller than Nainital Lake.

== Locality ==
The town is divided into 7 wards, where elections are held every 5 years. There are more than 101 (gramsabha) villages in the Chaukhutia region. Chakhutia is a center of those villages, including Maal dhon, Ritachoura, Bijrani, Rewari, Gwelchora, Chandikhet, Dhudalia, Sungari, Ganai, Bhatkot, Shakle, Jhalla, Haat, Udlikhan, Digaut, Pipaldhar, Birkhumu, Jamania and Rampur. Bakhli, Baskenia, Bakhali, Baralgaw, Godi, Amsyari, Tedagaun, kotuda, Rampur, Maneyia, Taal, Kheeda, Pakhakhareek, Nawad, Jamrad, Asethi, Bhijlim, Bagdi, Prempuri, Akheti, Jukanauli, Gwali, Ghangholi, Basbhida, Dwarahat, Malla Tajpur, Naigad, Khata, Aamdai, Songau, Agargau, Jourashi, Bhalt Gaon, Bhoara Gaon, Chaani, Dang, Korni, Jaurasi, Jala, Farika, Gajar, Jairambakhal, Khadaktaya, Agarmanral, Bramaha Dev Chauri Talli Khatyari, Bichli Khatyari, Malli Khatyari and others.

== Transport ==
National Highway 109 connects Chaukhutia to the cities of Almora, Dwarahat, Karnaprayag and Haldwani. Regular buses ply between Chaukhutia and Ramnagar.

There have been plans to link Chaukhutia to Ramnagar with a Rail line. This rail line would be instrumental in bringing Gairsain, the proposed capital of Uttarakhand, on the Railway map. There have also been speculations about another railway line, that would connect Chaukhutia to Bageshwar via Garur.

Construction of an Chaukhutia Airport also announced in 2017.

== Sources ==
- https://web.archive.org/web/20090704061713/http://www.indiatourism.com/uttaranchal-tourism/chaukhutia-tourism.html
- http://wikimapia.org/#lat=29.8835555&lon=79.3499994&z=15&l=0&m=a&v=2
