= Deepak Rawat =

Indian Administrative Service officer (born 1977)

- Education: St George's College, Mussoorie; Hansraj College (B.A.); Delhi University; Jawaharlal Nehru University (M.A. & M.Phil)
- Occupations: Civil servant, IAS officer
- Years active: 2007–present
- Title: Commissioner of Kumaon Division, Uttarakhand* Secretary to Chief Minister of Uttarakhand

Deepak Rawat is an Indian Administrative Service officer of Uttarakhand cadre. He is currently posted as the commissioner of Kumaon division, Uttarakhand and additionally as secretary to Chief Minister of Uttarakhand. As an IAS officer he is known for his huge social media presence across YouTube and Instagram.

== Early life and education ==
Rawat attended St. George's College, Barlowganj in Mussoorie. He completed his graduation in History Honours from Hansraj College, Delhi and Post-graduation from JNU. After that, he passed the civil services examination, becoming an IAS officer.

== Career ==
Rawat is an IAS officer from the 2007 batch. He has served in various positions as district magistrate and is recognized for conducting multiple raids during his tenure.

Rawat has stated that a retired IPS officer, Anil Kumar Raturi (former DGP Uttarakhand), inspired him to pursue a career in civil services.

=== Indian Revenue Service ===
In his third attempt, Rawat passed the Union Public Service Commission (UPSC) examination and was appointed to the Indian Revenue Service (IRS - Customs).

=== Indian Administrative Service ===
Rawat continued his preparations and cleared the Union Public Service Commission (UPSC) Civil Services Examination (CSE) twice, resulting in his appointment to the Indian Administrative Service (IAS).

He was posted as district magistrate of Bageshwar (2011) and was transferred as managing director of Kumaon Vikas Mandal (2012). Later he transferred as district magistrate of Nainital (2014–2017) and Haridwar (2017–2019) respectively.

During his tenure as managing director of Uttarakhand Power Corporation Ltd. (UPCL) and Power Transmission Corporation of Uttarakhand Ltd. (PTCUL), and director of Uttarakhand Renewable Energy Development Agency (UREDA), Rawat worked under the supervision of senior officials, including Vinod Prasad Raturi, who was then secretary in the Uttarakhand government. Rawat was further appointed as Haridwar Kumbh Mela officer. He is currently serving as commissioner of Kumaon division, Uttarakhand and additionally as secretary to Chief Minister of Uttarakhand, Pushkar Singh Dhami.

Rawat has gained some notability for his work related videos on YouTube.

== Awards and honours ==
Rawat received the National Award in 2019 for his work as a District Nutrition Mission officer. The award was presented to him by Union Minister Smriti Irani. Rawat dedicated the award to Anganwadi, a government-sponsored child-care and mother-care centre in India.

== Controversy and criticism ==
=== Supreme Court warning ===
In December 2018, a bench of the Supreme Court of India, led by Justice Ranjan Gogoi, issued a warning to Rawat. He and his subordinate, Roorkee Joint Magistrate Nikita Khandelwal, were reportedly conducting a demolition drive in Jaurasi Village where they violated the established court procedures during the operation. The court cautioned Rawat to comply with court orders and avoid any actions that may be perceived as contravening them.

=== Charges for attempted murder ===
During his tenure as collector in Haridwar in January 2018, an attempt to murder case was filed against Rawat by a priest. The priest alleged that Rawat, along with his helper, had assaulted him in a closed room. This incident occurred in the context of a dispute between the government and an ashram over land use. Rawat denied the allegations and claimed that they were part of a larger conspiracy to defame him. The case was later dropped due to lack of evidence. However, the incident was widely reported in the media and raised questions about Rawat's conduct as a government official.
