= National Highway 109 (India) =

National highway in India

National Highway 109
- Map of National Highway 109 in red

Route information
- Length: 284 km (176 mi)

Major junctions
- South end: Rudrapur
- NH 309A and NH 309B at Almora; NH 109K at Simli
- North end: Karnaprayag

Location
- Country: India
- States: Uttarakhand
- Primary destinations: Rudrapur, Pantnagar, Haldwani, Kathgodam, Nainital, Almora, Ranikhet, Dwarahat, Gairsain, Karnaprayag

Highway system
- Roads in India; Expressways; National; State; Asian
← NH 9	→ NH 7

National Highway 109 (NH 109), (Previously NH 87), is a highway in India which runs in the Indian state of Uttarakhand. It is one of the most important routes, connecting the entire Kumaon region to the state as well as the country. It is also the major route towards the hill stations such as Nainital, Kausani, Ranikhet, Mukteswar and Almora from Delhi. Previously known as NH 87, it was renumbered as NH 109 in 2010. The northern terminal is at NH 7 near Karnaprayag and the southern terminal is at National Highway 9 near Rudrapur. More than 10,000 vehicles travel through NH-109 in tourist season.

== Route ==
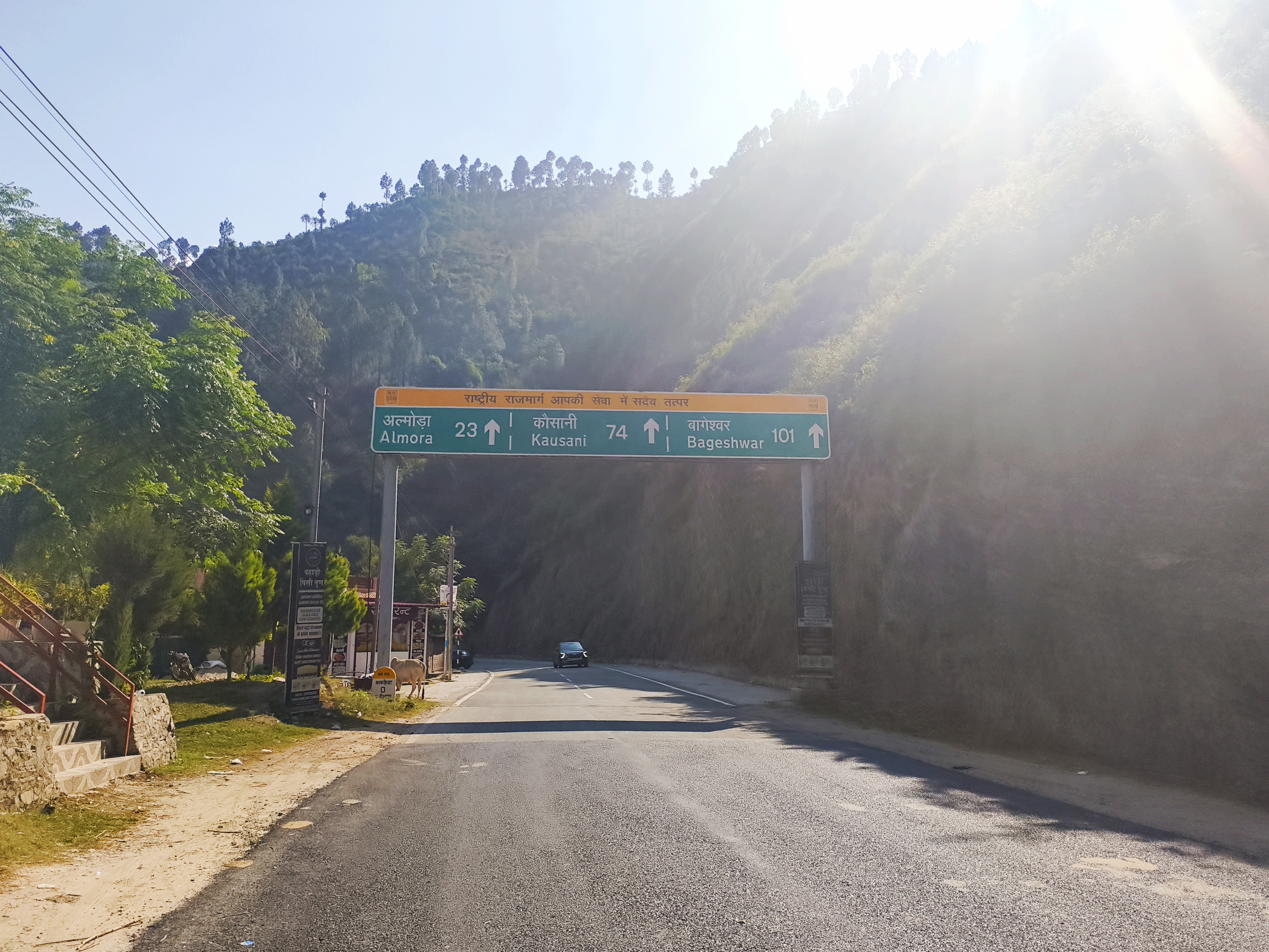
NH 109 at Kakrighat, near Almora.

The Highway Starts from its Junction with NH 9 and connecting the cities of Rudrapur, Pantnagar, Haldwani, Kathgodam, Nainital, Bhowali, Almora, Ranikhet, Dwarahat, Chaukhutia, Gairsain and Adi Badri, terminates with its junction with NH 7 near Karnaprayag. It runs for a distance of 284 km in the districts of Udham Singh Nagar, Nainital, Almora in Kumaon and Chamoli in Garhwal of the Indian state of Uttarakhand.

== Intersections ==
To Left			To Right	
Towards	Road	Junction	Road	Towards
Kashipur	NH 309	Rudrapur	NH 9	Kichha
Dineshpur	Gadarpur-Matkota Road	Patharchatta		
Haldwani	Rampur road	Patharchatta		
		Lalkuan	Bareilly-Nainital road	Kichha
Rudrapur	Rampur road	Haldwani		
Kaladhungi	Kaladhungi road	Haldwani		
		Kathgodam	Sitarganj road	Sitarganj
		Jeolikot	Bhowali-Haldwani road	Bhimtal
Kaladhungi	Bazpur road	Nainital		
		Bhowali	Bhowali-Haldwani road	Bhimtal
		Kaichi	Kaichi-Ramgarh road	Ramgarh
Ranikhet	Bhowali-Ranikhet road	Khairna		
		Kwarab	Mukteshwar road	Mukteshwar
		Almora	NH 309A	Bageshwar
		Almora	Almora-Gopeshwar road	Kausani
Ramnagar	Ramnagar road	Ranikhet		
Bhikiyasen	Sinar road	Dwarahat	Kausani road	Someshwar
Masi	Ganai-Masi road	Chaukhutia		
Satpuli	Kotdwar road	Mehalchauri		
		Simli	NH 109K	Bageshwar
Rudraprayag	NH 7	Karnaprayag	NH 7	Chamoli Gopeshwar

== See also ==
- List of national highways in India
- National Highways Development Project
