= Bhararisain =

Summer capital of Uttarakhand, India

- Summer capital of Uttarakhand
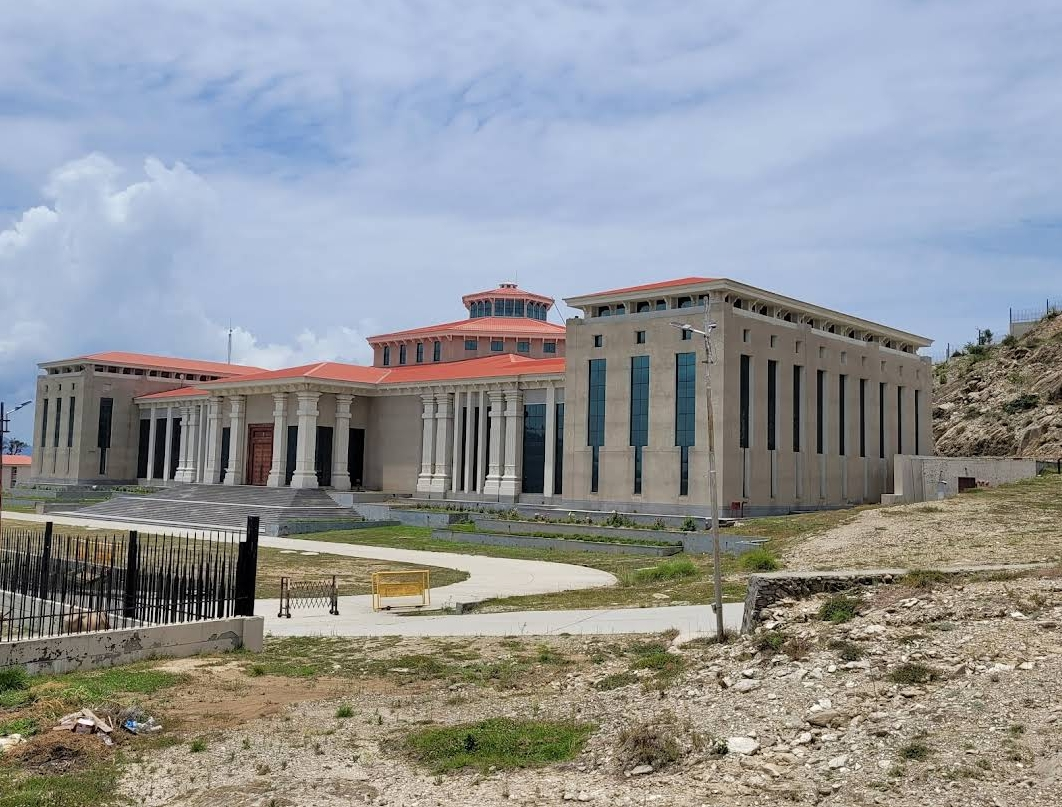
- Interactive map of Bhararisain
- Coordinates: 30.0981215°N 79.2651987°E
- Country: India
- State: Uttarakhand
- District: Chamoli
- Tehsil: Gairsain
- Elevation: 2,390 m (7,840 ft)

Languages
  - Official: Hindi and Sanskrit
  - Regional: Garhwali
- Time zone: UTC+5:30 (IST)
- PIN: 246428
- Telephone code: 01363
- Vehicle registration: UK-11
- Lok Sabha constituency: Garhwal
- Vidhan Sabha constituency: Karnaprayag
- Website: uk.gov.in

Bhararisain is the summer capital of the Indian state of Uttarakhand. It is located in Chamoli district's Gairsain tehsil, around 14 km from the town of Gairsain.

== History ==
On Uttarakhand's statehood, some activists considered Gairsain an ideal location for the capital of the new state. But Dehradun became the temporary capital. V. N. Dixit commission, set up to decide the location of a permanent capital, rejected Gairsain as too prone to earthquakes. In 2012, due to local demands, then Chief Minister of Uttarakhand Vijay Bahuguna held cabinet meetings in Gairsain and started construction of an assembly building in Gairsain.

== Vidhan Sabha complex ==
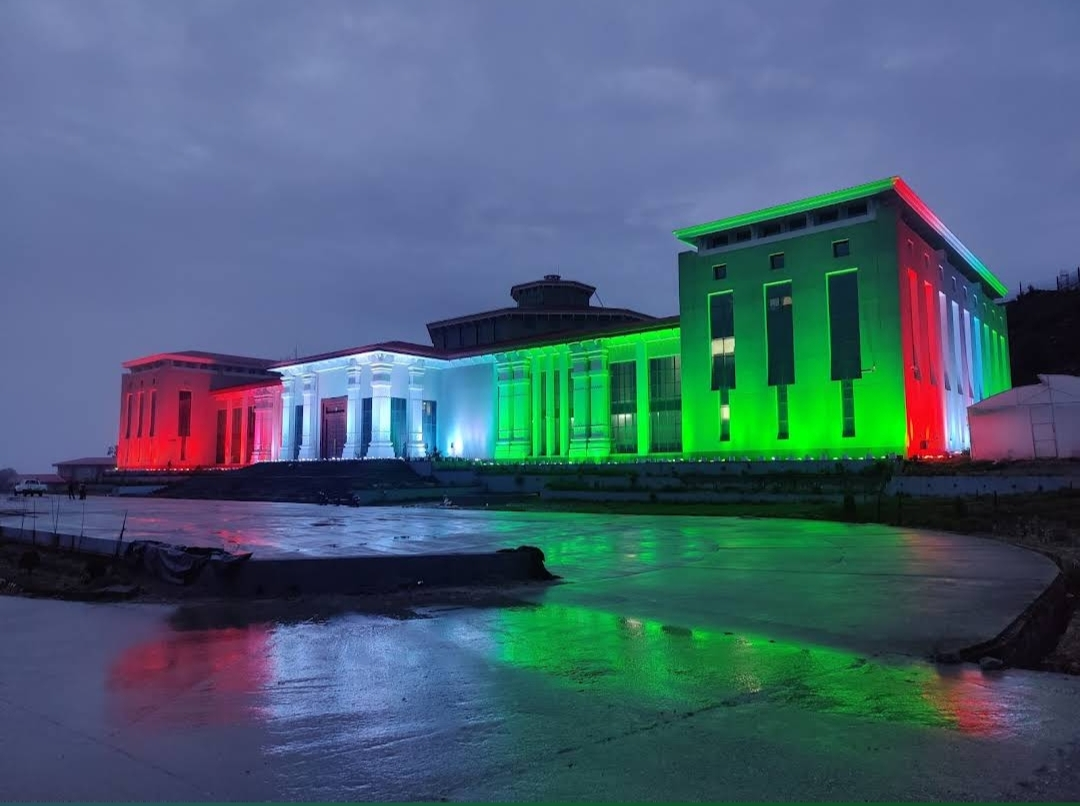

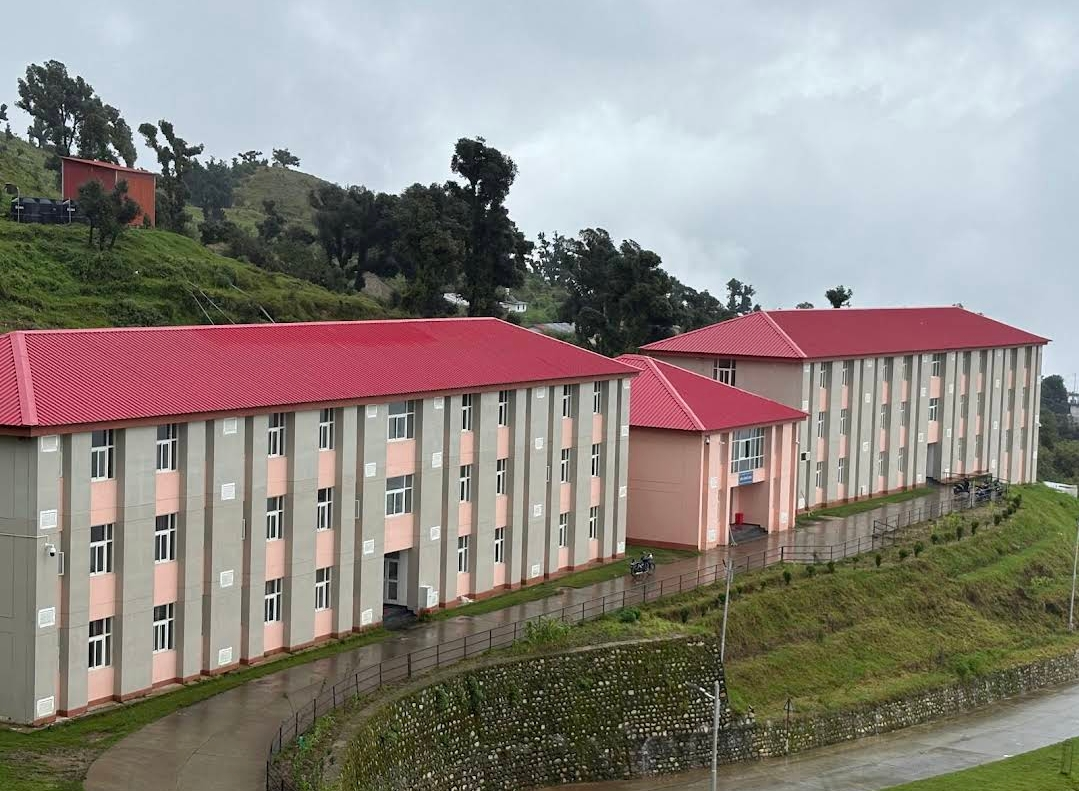

Covering 47 acres (19 ha), the assembly building is estimated to have cost ₹150 crores. In the summer, officials travel from Dehradun along with documents to Gairsain for the assembly session. Complex is kept closed during the snowy winters.
