= Pushpesh Tripathi =

Indian politician

Member, 1st Uttarakhand Legislative Assembly
- In office 2004–2007

Member, 2nd Uttarakhand Legislative Assembly
- In office 2007–2012

President of the Uttarakhand Kranti Dal
- In office 2015–2017

Personal details
- Born: 8 January 1980 (age 46) Dwarahat, Uttar Pradesh (present-day Uttarakhand, India)
- Party: Uttarakhand Kranti Dal
- Parent: Bipin Chandra Tripathi (father)
- Education: Kumaon University (MSc Botany); Indian Institute of Remote Sensing (Diploma)
- Occupation: Social Activist; Politician
- Known for: Uttarakhand movement
- Website: pushpesh.com

Pushpesh Tripathi (Hindi: पुष्पेश त्रिपाठी; born 8 January 1980) is an Indian politician and former president of Uttarakhand Kranti Dal from Dwarahat, Uttarakhand. He was a member of the first and second Legislative Assembly of Uttarakhand from Dwarahat constituency.

== Early life and education ==
Pushpesh was born on 8 January 1980 in Dairi village of Dwarahat, Uttarakhand. His primary education started from his native village, Dairi, and after that he went to DSB Campus, Nainital to pursue higher education, where he graduated in MSc Botany. He also did a 6-month diploma course in Geographic Information System (GIS) from Indian Institute of Remote Sensing, Dehradun.

== Social activism and political career ==
He was active in Uttarakhand state movement since his student days in which he made a significant contribution by actively participating in Pauri Commissioner Gherao, Nainital Commissioner Gherao, Jail Bharo movement. He was elected as MLA from Dwarahat assembly constituency after the sudden death of his father Late Shri Bipin Chandra Tripathi in 2004 and then he got re-elected as MLA in the second assembly election of Uttarakhand in 2007. He was appointed as the central president of Uttarakhand Kranti Dal in May 2015 and he served as the president of the regional party till 2017.

== See also ==
- Uttarakhand movement
- Bipin Chandra Tripathi
- Uttarakhand Kranti Dal
