= St. George's College, Mussoorie =

School in Mussoorie, India

Coordinates: 30.4351995°N 78.0877152°E

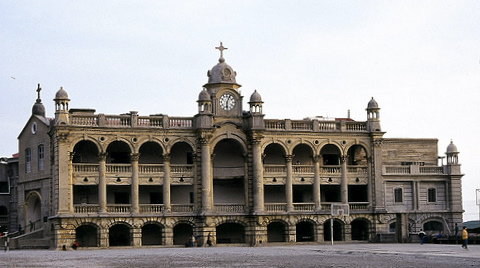
- St. George's College
- Barlowganj, Mussoorie, India

Information
- Motto: Virtus et Labor (Character and work)
- Founded: 1853; 173 years ago
- Principal: Brother Jeyaseelan S.
- Grades: 4 to 12
- Gender: Boys
- Age range: 9 to 17
- Enrollment: ~700
- Area: 400 acres (1.6 km^{2})
- Houses: 4
- Affiliation: Council for the Indian School Certificate Examinations
- Alumni: The Manorite Alumni Association
- Website: www.sgconline.ac.in

St. George's College, Mussoorie, is an all-boys boarding and non-boarding school in Mussoorie, in the state of Uttarakhand, India, affiliated to the Council for the Indian School Certificate Examinations board. The school, an all-boys residential and non-residential institution, spreading over 400 acres (1.6 km^{2}) of land, was founded in 1853 by the Capuchin Fathers and entrusted to the Society of the Brothers of St. Patrick (Ireland) in 1893. It was opened in a cottage known as Manor House; the name by which the campus is still known. The students are known as Manorites.

The school has an alumni network spread across the globe. In 2005, the Indian Air Force gifted the school a trainer jet aircraft, TS-11 Iskra, as a tribute to the distinguished service of the school's alumni in the armed forces.

== History ==
The school was founded in 1853 by the Capuchin Fathers who gave it to the Society of the Reverend Brothers of St. Patrick (Ireland) in 1893 with Bro. Stapleton as its first principal.

While St. George's College was founded in 1853, another school, St. Fidelis High School, was started in the same location in 1863. Initially, the Capuchin Fathers ran both schools with Father James Doogan as principal of both from 1873 till they were given to the Patrician Brothers in 1893. In 1948, St. Fidelis High School was amalgamated with St. George's College. There still are old directional markings on the school campus pointing towards the old St. Fidelis. In the early 1900s, the then Principal, Bro. Haverty, levelled the top of the hill to create what is the Top Flat, the school's largest playing field.

The Science labs were constructed in 1925 adjacent to the top flat. The school acquired the Whytebank Castle and Brooklands Estate in 1939, and an auditorium was constructed in 1942.

The school is named after Saint George, the patron saint of England and a number of countries and cities around the world. The legend of Saint George slaying the dragon is known throughout the world, and forms the theme of the school's emblem.

A clock tower was erected on the field in 1936, and was the first clock tower in Mussoorie. It was installed by JB Joyce & Company, who imported the clock from England. The chimes, ringing every 15 minutes, would also help keep away the wild animals from the surrounding woods.

Under the guidance of then principal, Bro. J.C. Carroll, the school witnessed a construction boom in the 1990s. This included a new indoor gymnasium, a library, a multi-functional auditorium, and an indoor heated swimming pool. There were upgrades to old dormitories and class rooms. The alumni network of the school contributed substantial funds and donated material towards the construction.

The St. George's College museum displays the 150-year history of the school. The museum also serves as an archive for preserving hundreds of old photographs, instruments, school records, yearbooks and furniture. The collection includes photographs from the 1870s, scientific instruments from the 1900s, and an old piano.

== School site ==
St. George's College is spread over a 450-acre (1.8 km^{2}) estate in Barlowganj village, a hamlet situated 5 km from the hill town of Mussoorie, popularly referred to as the 'Queen of Hills'. There are two schools, one is Nirmala Convent School for economically weaker inhabitants of Mussoorie, the other St. George's College. Both schools stand on a 400-acre property. St. George's stands on a hill overlooking the Sivalik Hills with a view of Mussoorie and the Dehradun valley. The school is accessed by road from Dehradun Railway Station 28 km away, and from Jolly Grant Airport in Dehradun, 53 km away.

== School life ==
St. George's College house system encompasses sports, athletics, debates, dramatics, cultural events, declamations and other extra-curricular activities. The four houses are Tapsells (blue), Marthins (yellow), Gateleys (red) and Cullens (green), all named after four former Olympians from the school.

Each event is assigned points and the house with the largest number of accumulated points at the end of Sports Day in October wins the annual House Shield.

A majority of the students are Indians, but the school has a sizeable percentage of NRI's and students from Nepal, Thailand and others. The proximity to Jolly Grant Airport in Dehradun which is just 53 km away has led to an increase in the Non Resident Indian students.

== In popular culture ==
St. George's was chosen as the location for the shooting of television drama based on the life of the noted writer from Mussoorie, Ruskin Bond. The show, Ek Tha Rusty, named after the author's nickname, was aired on Doordarshan.

In 2012, Rocky and Mayur, hosts of Highway on My Plate, a weekly travel and food show on NDTV channel, visited the school and ate a meal at the cafeteria with the students.

The school campus is featured in two television commercials: one for Hyundai Accent sedan in which the school's library, junior dormitories and the clock tower can be seen, and the second being for Cadbury Bournvita in which the school's green flat, indoor swimming pool and the parish church can be seen. The school campus was also featured in the promotional ad for the 6th season of Kaun Banega Crorepati.

== Notable alumni ==
=== Indian Armed Forces ===
- General Shankar Roychowdhury, PVSM (Class of 1953), Chief of Army Staff of the Indian Army (1994–1997); Member of Parliament, Rajya Sabha.
- Air Chief Marshal Denis La Fontaine, (Class of 1946) - the 13th Chief of Air Staff of the Indian Air Force (1985–1988).
- Air Chief Marshal Birender Singh Dhanoa - the 25th Chief of the Air Staff (2016-2019).
- Lieutenant General Daulet Singh - General Officer Commanding-in-Chief Western Command (1961-1963), died in harness.
- Lieutenant General Anil Kumar Bhatt - General Officer Commanding XV Corps (2018-2019).
- Air Marshal Denzil Keelor, Vir Chakra, Kirti Chakra, (Class of 1940), Indo-Pakistani War of 1965.
- Wing Commander Trevor Keelor, Vir Chakra, Vayu Sena Medal; hero of the Indo-Pakistani War of 1965.
- Major Haripal Singh Ahluwalia (Class of 1954), IOFS officer. Padma Bhushan, Padma Shree, Arjuna Award; first Indian to scale Mount Everest on 29 May 1965. Injured in 1965 war. President- Rehabilation Council of India, Organised and led motor expeditions over the Himalayas and Tibet to the Silk Route. Author of several books.

=== Sports ===
- Willie G. Cullen, Ernie .J. Cullen, Michael Gateley, George Eric Marthins, Lionel Emmett, Carlyle Carroll Tapsell - Gold medal winners for India in field hockey - 1928 Amsterdam Olympic Games, 1932 Los Angeles Olympic Games, 1936 Berlin Olympic Games

=== Performing arts ===
- Melville De Mello (Class of 1932), Padma Shri, broadcaster and author;
- Saeed Jaffrey (Class of 1940), cultural ambassador and actor; first Indian actor featuring on Broadway; performances in British and Indian film and television.
- Lucky Ali, singer and actor
- Kanwaljit Singh (Class of 1966), film and television actor
- Bhupinder Singh - Film and TV Actor
- Ravi Baswani - Actor, most remembered for his role in "Chashme Buddoor "(1981) and "Jaane Bhi Do Yaaro" (1983), winning the Filmfare Best Comedian Award in 1984
- Rohan Mehra- Film and TV Actor

=== Civil Services ===
- Dr. M.S Gill (Class of 1952), Chief Election Commissioner of India (1996–2001), Member, Rajya Sabha (2004–2005), former Union Minister of Youth Affairs and Sports, Government of India.
- Avinder Singh Brar, IPS - Awarded Padma Shri posthumously in 1988 for bravery during terrorism in Punjab.
- Deepak Rawat, IAS - Commissioner of Kumaon division, Uttarakhand.

=== Members of Parliament ===
- Satpal Maharaj, Member of Parliament, 15th Lok Sabha, from Garhwal Lok Sabha Constituency.
- Neville Foley, Member of Parliament, Lok Sabha.
- Lalit Suri, Member of Parliament, Rajya Sabha.

=== Judges ===
- Justice H. S. Bedi - Justice of the Supreme Court of India.

=== Pakistani nationals ===
- Brigadier Mervyn Cardoza, Tamgha-e-Khidmat, Pakistan Army.
- Mumtaz Bhutto - Pakistani Politician.
