= Bipin Tripathi Kumaon Institute of Technology =

- बिपिन त्रिपाठी कुमाऊँ प्रौद्योगिकी संस्थान, द्वाराहाट
- Motto: उत्तिष्ठत जाग्रत प्राप्य वरान्निबोधत
- Type: Engineering college
- Established: 1991
- Director: Dr. Santosh kumar Hampannavar
- Faculty
- Undergraduates: 1600
- Postgraduates: 179
- Location: Dwarahat, Uttarakhand, India; 29.754°N 79.427°E
- Campus: Rural
- acronym: BTKIT
- Website: www.kecua.ac.in

https://kecua.ac.in/

Bipin Tripathi Kumaon Institute of Technology, formerly Kumaon Engineering College (KEC), is an autonomous engineering and technology institute in Almora district in the state of Uttarakhand, India. The institute is located in the city of Dwarahat.

It is financed by the government of Uttarakhand and managed by the Board of Governors with the Minister of Technical Education Government of Uttarakhand as the chairman and the Secretary of Technical Education as vice-chairman. Originally it was affiliated with Uttarakhand Technical University.

== History ==
The college was established by the government of Uttar Pradesh in 1986 and started functioning in 1991. Now the institute is named after the renowned Uttarakhand movement activist Bipin Chandra Tripathi.

The college was founded under the guidance of Narayan Dutt Tiwari on 20 April 1986, during the reign of late Chief Minister Vir Bahadur Singh; 155 acres of land were allotted for the college by the UP Govt.

Academic session for B.E. was started with two branches, CSE (Core Branch) and ECE in 1991 with a well-planned educational program, similar to the one followed at IITs and RECs/NITs for the development of technology & engineering education facilities in the Kumaon Region. Seeing the availability, capability, and usefulness of land, the college prepared a master plan and project report regarding development in 1996, which was approved by the administrative council.

The institute currently offers seven undergraduate engineering programs:

Computer Science and Engineering,

Electronics and Communication Engineering,

Electrical Engineering,

Civil Engineering,

Chemical Engineering,

Mechanical Engineering, and Biotechnology.

Additionally, it offers three postgraduate programs: Master of Computer Applications (MCA) and Master of Technology (M.Tech.) with specializations in Electronics and Communication Engineering, Computer Science and Engineering, and Mechanical Engineering.

Besides this, the institute started PhD programs in 2016. The institute offers other infrastructural facilities for faculty and students, such as hostels, staff residential campus, departmental buildings, student's activity club and a multipurpose hall have been developed. An atmosphere conducive to learning and all-round personality development of the students is being created. Emphasis is being laid on self-discipline and mutual respect.

== Location ==
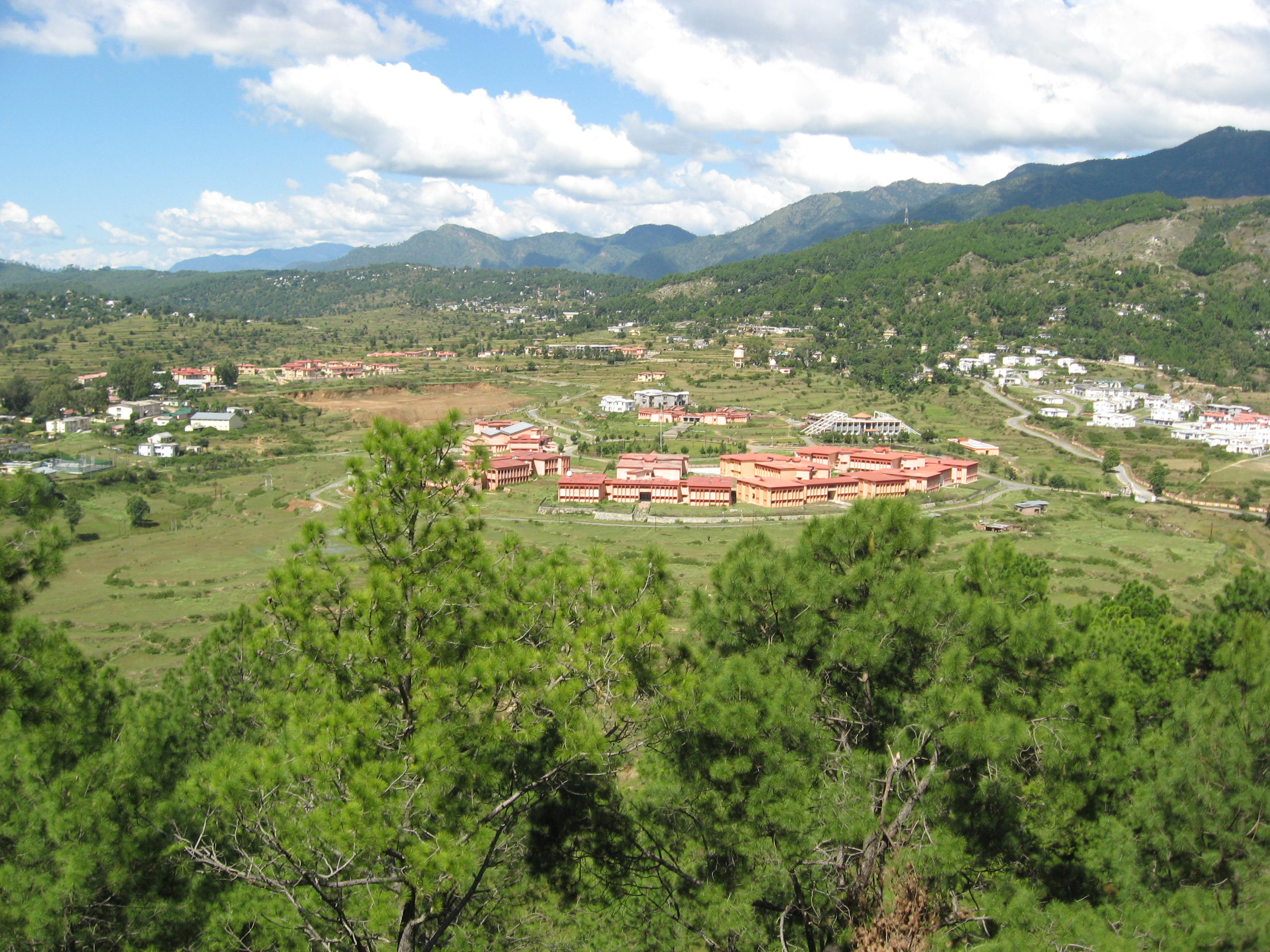
Aerial view of the college

Academics and administrative buildings

The college is in the hilly region of Dwarahat on Kathgodam-Ranikhet-Karnaprayag National Highway (109), about 30 km from Ranikhet and about 3 km from Dwarahat near Gauchar village. The nearest railway station is at Haldwani (118 km).

The college is spread over an area of 155 acres (0.6 km^{2}) at an altitude of 1450 meters.

The weather is cold throughout most of the year, though temperatures can reach 30 °C during summer.

The Dunagiri, Panduakholi, Sookha Devi and Mansa Devi temples are at the outskirts of Dwarahat.

== Administration and organization ==
The institute is administered by an autonomous society named "Bipin Tripathi Kumaun Institute of Technology Dwarahat Society" which is registered under the Societies Registration Act. The memorandum of association, society rules, bye-laws and employees conduct rules are duly approved by the Uttarakhand state government. The institute enjoys freedom with regard to internal administration and functioning.

The Administration Section of BTKIT, Dwarahat is headed by a registrar and functions under the overall supervision of the director.

The following functions and duties are performed by the Administration Section:

- All establishment matters pertaining to the teaching and non-teaching employees of the institute
- Maintenance of their service books and personal files of all employees
- Legal cases
- Disciplinary cases
- Conducting of meetings of the Board of Governors and KEC Society
- Recruitment of regular, ad hoc and contract employees and maintenance of Roster Register
- Processing of Career Advancement and Assured Career Progression Cases
- Printing of advertisements on behalf of the institute
- Central dispatch work
- Vigilance cases

== Academics ==
The college offers Bachelor of Technology, Bachelor of Computer Application and Master of Technology, Master of Computer Application degrees, as well as Master of Computer Applications. It offers CCNA and Oracle (scheduled) courses.

=== Undergraduate courses ===
The college has departments that offer Bachelor of Computer Application degree and seven B.Tech. degree programs in Electrical Engineering, Electronics & Communication Engineering, Computer Science & Engineering, Mechanical Engineering, Biotechnology, Civil Engineering & Chemical Engineering.

=== Postgraduate courses ===
The college provides three M.Tech. degrees programs in VLSI (ECE), Thermal Engineering (ME) and Computer Science & Engineering (CSE). The institute is offers a three-year degree program in Master of Computer Applications.

=== Doctoral program ===
The college started offering the Doctor of Philosophy degree (Ph.D.) as part of its doctoral education programme in disciplines from July 2016.

=== Scintilla ===
The foundation day of college celebrated as an annual fest in every even semester.

=== Spardha ===
The annual sports meet organised by the college.

=== Aarohan ===
The national-level techfest organised in the odd semester every year.

== Departments ==
The college has eight departments:

- Applied Science
- Computer Science Engineering
- Electronics Engineering
- Mechanical Engineering
- Biotechnology
- Electrical Engineering
- Civil Engineering
- Chemical Engineering

== Library ==
The college has a Central Library, which is open access. Students and staff have access to a large number of books and journals, besides many competitive and technical magazines. The library is procuring about 14 international journals and 50 national journals. It is the heart of academic and research activities of BTKIT. It has been catering to the needs of faculty members, research scholars, and students on campus. It has huge volumes of books and e-journals which cover the disciplines of technology, computer science, management, humanities, applied science and other related areas.

The institute's library serves students, staff and faculty, supporting research, teaching and learning. Its services are provided through a central library and departmental libraries.

The library consists of 45,000 books with around 6,000 titles, as well as national and international journals and magazines. In addition, the institute has a digital library with study material from NPTEL and VISIONET. An online library facility is also available to students.

Most of the books are distributed among the students for the following academic year.

== Hostels ==
The college has nine boys' and three girls' hostels and one transit hostel. All the hostels have large space and privacy. Each hostel has its own mess, common room and garden in its own premises. All hostels are inside the campus itself and the academic block and all departments are nearest.

New Boys' Hostel and Vindhyanchal hostel were built as a set of single rooms for individual students but currently, two students are living in one room of the hostel thereof.

One boys' hostel (180 single seated) is under construction. The following are the hostels in KEC:

- Aravali Hostel [90 X 2] BTech, final year and MCA 2nd Year Boys
- Trishul Hostel [25 X 2], MCA First Year Boys and M.Tech. Boys (Closed)
- Nanda Devi Hostel [60 X 3] B.Tech., Second Year Boys (For CS/EE/ECE/CHE)
- Shivalik Hostel [30 X 2] B.Tech., First Year Boys (Closed)
- Gaumukh Hostel [60 X 3] B.Tech., First Year Boys
- Gangotri Hostel [60 X 3] B.Tech., Final Year Girls
- Kailash Hostel [120 X 2] B.Tech., Final Year CS and Third Year Civil And CS Branch Boys
- Yamunotri Hostel [60 X 2] MCA, Pre-Final Year and B.Tech. Second Year girls
- Nalanda Hostel [60 X 1] First Year Girls (Closed)
- Transit Hostel [60 X 1] First Year Girls (Closed)
- Vindhyachal Hostel [125 X 1] B.Tech., Third Year Boys
- New Boys Hostel [120 X 1] MCA, 2nd Year and B.Tech.
- Saraswati Hostel MCA, Pre-Final Year Girls and B.Tech., Pre-Final Year Girls

== Notable alumni ==
There are 5000+ alumni across the globe who have contributed to the development of the nation, and been a part of both domestic and international companies. Here are few of them.

- Ankur Singh (Biochemical, 2004), Associate Professor, Woodruff School of Mechanical Engineering and Coulter Dept. of Biomedical Engineering, Georgia Institute of Technology, USA[6]
- Nitin Joshi, Assistant Professor of Anaesthesia, Harvard University.
- Arun Kumar Singh (Electronics, 2000), Assistant Professor, Indian Institute of Technology, Jodhpur, India
- Nitin Joshi (Biochemical, 2006), Instructor of Medicine at Brigham and Women's Hospital, Harvard Medical School, USA
- Vinod Pandey (Electronics, 2007), CTO/Co-founder Mycbseguide
- Chandramani Kishore (Electronics, 2003), Assistant Professor, Indian Institute of Science, Bangalore, India
- Shailesh Kharkwal (Biochemical, 2006), Water scientist and CEO EnviroSens, NUS Singapore
- Himanshu Joshi ( Electronics, 2007), Co-Founder Toprankers, a career net company
- Harish Goswami( Computer Science, 2008), Co-Founder Toprankers & ViDU.Tech, a career net company
- Manoj Kandpal (Biochemical, 2006), Associate Professor, Department of Preventive Medicine and Surgery, Feinberg School of Medicine, Northwestern University, Chicago
- Abhay Kotnala (Electronics, 2007), Assistant Professor, University of Houston.
- Deepak Singh Nagarkoti (Electronics, 2007), Kilby Labs, Texas Instruments, United States.
- Sanjeev Kumar (Biochemical, 2008), Assistant Professor, Indian Institute of Technology, Roorke
- Sanjiv Bhakhura (ECE 2003), IRS Officer, Additional Commissioner of Income Tax, Govt. of India.

== See also ==
- Seemant Institute of Technology, Pithoragarh
- Institute of Technology Gopeshwar, Gopeshwar
