= Melville de Mellow =

Indian radio presenter

Melville Frederick Oswald de Mellow
- Born: April 28, 1913; Jodhpur, Jodhpur State, British India
- Occupation: Radio broadcaster
- Honours: Padma Shri

Melville Fredrick Oswald de Mellow (also de Mello) (28 April 1913 – 4 June 1989) was an Indian radio broadcaster with the All India Radio.

He is remembered for his high-quality reports and commentary on various events in independent India, the most notable of which was a seven-hour broadcast of Mahatma Gandhi's funeral in Delhi. He was conferred the Padma Shri by the Government of India in 1963 in recognition of his services to broadcasting.

== Family and education ==
De Mellow was educated at Bishop Cotton School, Shimla, and St George's College, Mussorie and served as a Lieutenant in the 5/2 Punjab Regiment before joining the All India Radio. Melville de Mellow was one of the pioneers, the first batch of cadets to graduate from the Indian Military Academy. He was married to Coralie Emma de Mellow and his nephew Ian Tudor de Mellow is a recipient of the Medal of the Order of Australia (OAM) for his services to aged welfare.

== Broadcasting career ==
Melville de Mellow worked with the All India Radio from April 1950 to April 1971 and belonged to the ‘staff artistes’ category. Following his superannuation he was retained as Producer (Emeritus) for another five years with AIR. De Mellow is remembered as an iconic broadcaster noted for his deep baritoned commentary of various events in independent India. In 1948 he accompanied the cortège bearing Mahatma Gandhi's body from Birla House to the cremation venue at Raj Ghat giving a seven-hour-long commentary of the event from an All India Radio van. Melville de Mellow's moving commentary that day, articulating the nation's grief and homage as the cortege moved towards Raj Ghat, is remembered as one of the best instances of radio broadcasting in India. His commentary that day inspired veteran Hindi commentator Jasdev Singh, then a seventeen-year-old, to take up commentary as a profession. Singh has since been conferred with a Padma Shri and a Padma Bhushan for his services to radio broadcasting. In 1952 Melville de Mellow was handpicked by the British Government for broadcasting a running commentary on Queen Elizabeth’s coronation procession. He was also the commentator at India's Republic Day parade for several years and his commentary of India-Pakistan hockey matches are remembered to this day. His reportage on the Bangladesh War and its subsequent liberation by Indian forces were keenly awaited by listeners of the radio.

== Books ==
Melville de Mellow is the author of several books on sports including The Story of the Olympics, which describes the run up to the 1964 Olympics in Tokyo, Remembered Glory, The Olympics and their Heroes, Reaching for Excellence, The Glory and Decay of Indian Sports and Indigenous Games & Martial Arts of India.

== Awards and honours ==
Melville de Mellow was feted for his work throughout his career. These include the Commonwealth Scholarship (BBC), 1948, Czechoslovak Radio Documentary Prize, 1960, Padma Shri (1963), Prize Italia for Radio Documentary (1964) - which he won for 'Lali and the Lions of Gir', a featured programme on All India Radio, Chaman Lal Award (1971), Czechoslovak Peace Essay Prize (1972), Excellence Award (ICFEE), 1975, Commentary Award (1975), Education Ministry's Award for Best Book on Sports (1976), Long Service Award (1977), FTE Award for Excellence in Radio & TV and the Asiad Jyoti Award (1984).
