= Jaurasi =

Mountain range in Uttarakhand, India

- Jaurasi Range
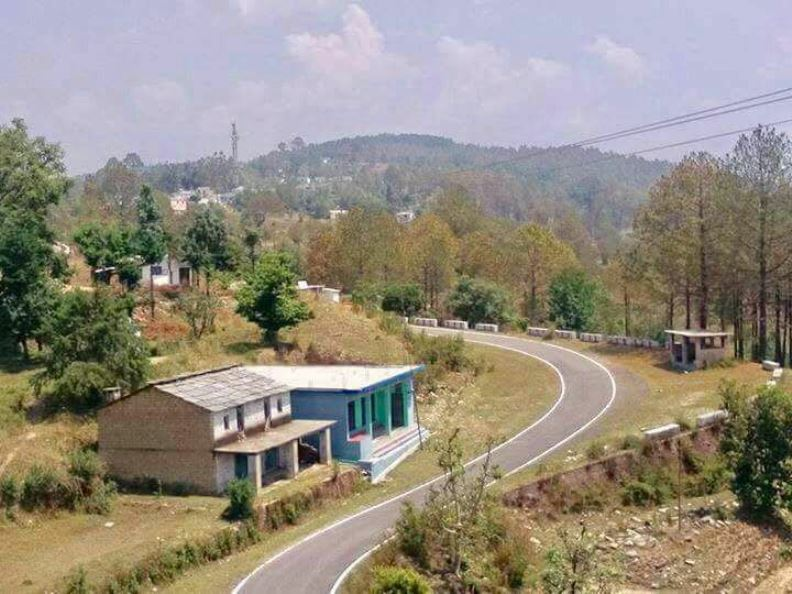
- Jaurasi View
- Interactive map of Jaurasi
- Location within Uttarakhand Location within India
- Coordinates: 29°46′30″N 79°09′40″E
- Country: India
- State: Uttarakhand
- District: Almora
- Time zone: UTC+5:30 (IST)
- PIN: 263656
- Telephone Code: 05966

Jaurasi is a mountain range situated between the middle of the Salt and Dwarahat assembly of the Almora district of Uttarakhand. It is situated between the Ramganga and Vinod rivers, which are about 6500 feet above sea level.

== Geography ==
The mountain range extends from the confluence of the two rivers, from Kedar to the top of Dudhatoli. The area adjacent to this mountain range is also known as the Jaurasi range, consisting of the mountains Jaurasi, Gairkhet, Ghaniyal Pokhar, Asurgadhi, Daanu Than, Chaubatia, Garhwal Bunga, Jadapani, Durga Devi, Kaliya Linguna, Nagchulakhal and Phulang. Jaurasi is situated on the boundary of three districts of Uttarakhand: Almora, Chamoli and Pauri. On one side are Chaukhutiya, Masi, Ranikhet, on the other side are Deghat, Syaldey, Bhikiyasain, and on the upper side are Gairsain and Nagchulakhaal. The British built many rest houses in the area, of which only Jaurasi Dak Bangla remains, maintained by the state government. All that remains of the Dak Bangla of Kelani are ruins. At the altitude, there is a persistent shortage of water, which has caused significant outward migration. To meet the shortage of water, the government approved the Asurgarhi Pumping Drinking Water Scheme from the Ramganga river, intended to boost tourism in the region.

== Political representation ==
- Vidhansabha Area - Jaurasi is between two legislative assemblies 1) Sult and 2) Dwarahat
- Vidhayak of Sult and Dwarahat Setra-
  - Sult - Surendra Singh Jeena (B J P)
  - Dwarahat - Mahesh Negi (B J P)

== Villages of the Jaurasi area ==
View from the Asurgarhi temple

=== Villages in Gewad ===
Jaurasi, Jala, Fadika, Jaintha Malla, Jaintha Talla, Surna Rekhadi, Surna Gopalgaon, Surna Bagwalikhet, Taya Surna, Chhani, Dang, Bheltgaon, Khatyadi Malli, Khatyadi Buchali, Khatayadi Talli, Kaurali, Selipatali, Chamadgaon, Sartoli, Timilkhaal, Tanhla, Basauli, Aadigram Kanodiya, Aadigram Fulieriya, Malsakhet, Sukhalon, kotida, Seemar, Seema, Sumanteshwar, Rugdhayee, Bakhali, Aadigram Bangari, Mausibau Bakhali, Bohragaon, Sunoli, Kaugad, Kushgaon, haat, Agarmanral, Pasauli, Mainpuri, Basnal Gaon, Satigaon, vaidigaw, kawerali palli, kawerali walli, Malsakhet, Lamkasuon, Sisodiya, Patharkhadi, Kakrakhat, Jayrambakhal, Jhayn Karchuli, Udalikhan, Parthola, Muskhan, Rotapani, Bangari Gaon, kwaripigaon, Mohan, Kaudhar, Sangaon, Maniya Dhahi, Jhlyakhat, Viramdyo, Aammadali etc.

=== Villages in Chaukot ===
Jaurasi, Kunakhaal, Kaligad, Gwalbeena, Malla Kafaltana, Talla Kafaltana, Malla Saugada, Talla Saugada, Gwakheel, Malla Ghanyal, Tall Ghanyal, Bichala Ghanyal, Ghaniyal Palla, Mangru, Bagotiyachhana, Mahgyari, Kaljheepa Joshi, Kahadgaon, Tamadhon, Joshi Pachruwa, Agari Pachruwa, Bachuli Seema, Jithani Katta, Basiseema, Motatimila, selipatali, Kanarikhil, Mohali, Sunoli, Titari, Gurana, Dhauliyagajar, Lambseemar, Kelani, Bakhali, Chauna, Sanarbheeda, Upradi, Jaikhal, Sabolichhana, Sanskhet, Kulseera, Futikuhan etc.

== Education and healthcare ==
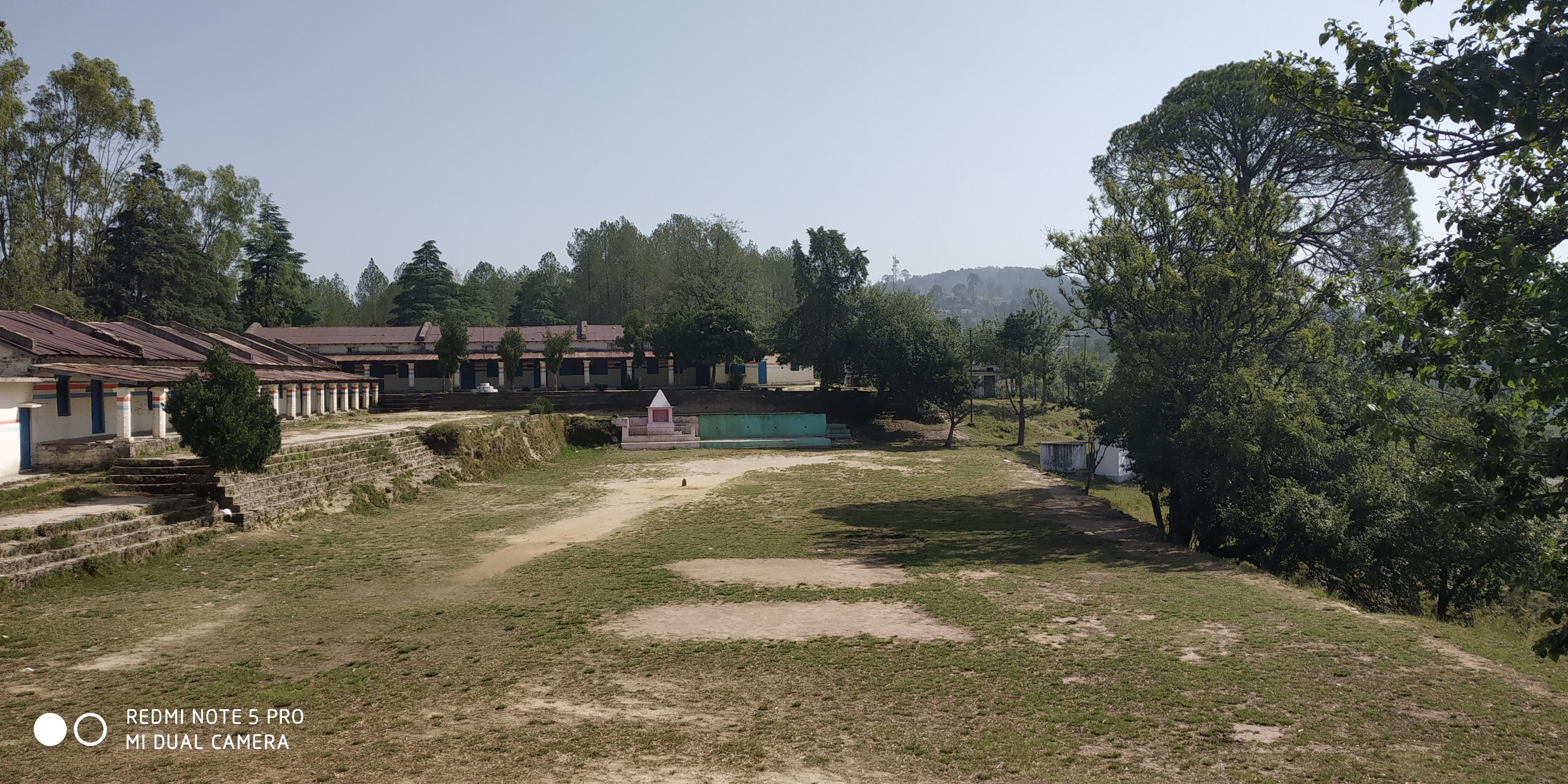
Aadarsh Inter College Jaurasi

Aadarsh Inter College, in Jaurasi town, was established in 1948, and is among the oldest schools in Uttarakhand. There are currently around 465 students at the school.

== Landmarks ==
Jaurasi Bhagwati Mandir- Bhagwati Temple is in the middle of Jaurasi, and according to traditional legend was constructed by Om Baba (also known as Omi Baba). The statue of Bhagwati Mata was erected around the same time by Shri Daulat Singh Ji, the King of Gwalbina. Jaurasi Mela is also organized on the Navami in the month of Chaitra every year. Bhairav Mandir, located 1.5 kilometers from Jaurasi. There is also a rest house, occupied by the British. The forest department has its office here, the only one in the Salt and Dwarahaat areas, and has converted the dak bungalow into a guest house. Asurgarhi Mandir - The peak of 7,000 feet is the highest mountain in the Jaurasi region. Nadeena (Gewar), Manila (Chaukot), Dudhatoli, Bugyal, Brahmdhungi and the Himalayas can be viewed from this point. The local people established a temple to Asur Mata, now changed Asurgarhi temple. The Jaurasi region is planning to set up the Asurgarhi Drinking Water Scheme from the Ramganga to this place.

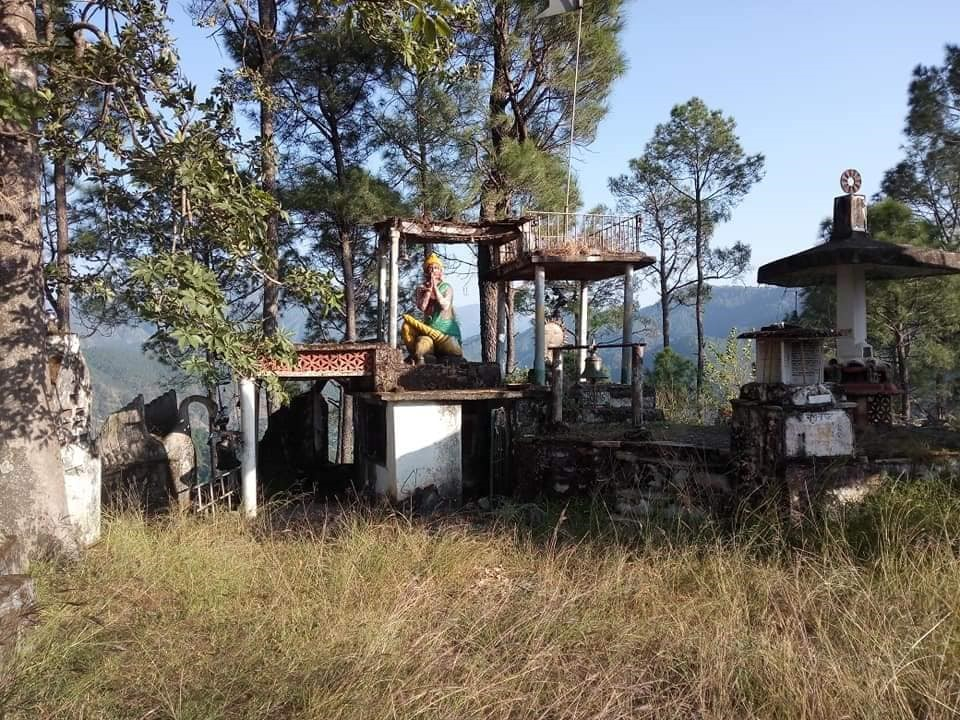
Fort of King of Katyuri

Fort of Kathuria king, Lakhanpur - Situated on the hill above the village of Udlikhan of Lakhanpur Kot in Jaurasi range, this site used to be a fort of the rulers of Pali. It was also known as Asan-Basan singhasan at that time. It was the kingdom of Katyuri king Asanti Basanti. There was once a market called Kalirau-Haat near Lakhanpur, but now it is just a village. The fort of Lakhanpur has turned to ruin, and the structures have been buried by road construction. There are many ruins of palaces and forts near the hill. King Veeram Dev was the last ruler. 200 metres above this fort, above the Haat village, Veeram Dev's Naala still remains and is often filled with water. At that time drinking water was supplied from these nullas. In the fort are the temple of Nursing Bhagwan, nine lakh Katyuri temples, Saraswati temple, Gayatri temple, Sheshawatar temple, Hanuman temple, Lakshman temple, 108 Shivling and others. Apart from this, there is a huge bell, yog sadhana room, katuri hammock and paradise ladder. A tunnel was constructed for the bathing of the queens, the remains of which still exist.

Mrityunjay Mahadev Mandir: This mythological temple is situated on the border of Gwalbina and Kafaltana Gram Sabha. During excavation by locals, ancient rare sculptures and shivling were discovered here, following which the Shivalaya was established by residents of both the Gram Sabha. Due to a lack of road access, information about this temple is limited to local residents.
