= Bipin Chandra Tripathi =

Indian politician

Member, Uttarakhand Legislative Assembly
- In office 2002–2004
- Constituency: Dwarahat

Personal details
- Born: 23 February 1945 Dwarahat, United Provinces, British India (present-day Uttarakhand, India)
- Died: 30 August 2004 (aged 59) Dwarahat, Uttarakhand, India
- Party: Uttarakhand Kranti Dal
- Education: Kumaon University
- Occupation: Social Activist; Environmentalist; Journalist; Politician
- Known for: Uttarakhand movement Chipko movement

Bipin Chandra Tripathi (Kumaoni: बिपिन चन्द्र त्रिपाठी; 23 February 1945 – 30 August 2004) was a social and environmental activist, a journalist, and a founding member of the Uttarakhand Kranti Dal, a political party in the Indian state of Uttarakhand.

== Early life ==
Bipin Tripathi was born on 23 February 1945 in village Dairi of Dwarahat, Almora district to Mathura Datt Tripathi and mother name was Kalawati Devi. He had his primary and secondary education at Mukteshwar, Nainital district. He passed his Intermediate from Dwarahat and went to Haldwani for pursuing the course of Electrical Diploma.

== Social and Environmental activism ==
After he graduated from Kumaon University in 1967 he threw his lot to the cause of the Samajwadi Andolan. He was highly influenced by the thoughts of socialist leader Dr. Ram Manohar Lohia. He fought for the landless villagers of Terai of Nainital district from 1965 to 1969. In 1968–69 he started publication of a fortnightly newspaper Yuvjan Mashal and led many public agitations highlighting various demands, including by hunger striking. In 1970 he was arrested by the state government of Uttar Pradesh for the first time, and after his release, he returned to Dwarahat. In 1971 he started his fortnightly paper Dronanchal Prahari. He also fought against the loot of forests by mafias and businessmen like Star Paper Mill, Lalkuan through his paper, with the result that a case was filed against him in the press council. He was among the frontrunner of the forest movement in uttarakhand. In 1974, along with other activists, he opposed forest auction in Nainital and was arrested with other 18 activists, this protest provoked demonstration throughout the region. In 1974 under his leadership, the biggest fight of Chipko movement, for saving Chacharidhar forest, was fought against Saharanpur paper mill, where they successfully saved the forest. In 1975 during Emergency he went to Jail for more than 22 months.

== Political career ==
Tripathi was a founding member of Uttarakhand Kranti Dal. The party was founded on 26 July 1979 at Nainital. Tripathi was essentially a democrat, committed to the struggles of the Highlanders of Uttarakhand. He was one of the staunch stalwarts who stood for the establishment of Uttarakhand and he successfully worked for the achievement of this goal. He became a member of the 1st Uttarakhand Legislative Assembly (MLA) in the year 2002 in the newly formed Uttarakhand State. He devoted himself for the cause of the development of Uttarakhand. He continued his fight with redoubled vigour and enthusiasm.

== Death ==
He died on 30 August 2004 at the age 59. At the time, he was also the president of the State Unit of the Uttarakhand Kranti Dal. After his death, his son Pushpesh Tripathi was elected as MLA from Dwarahat assembly constituency.

== See also ==
- Uttarakhand movement
- Bipin Tripathi Kumaon Institute of Technology
