= Dwarahat =

- Town
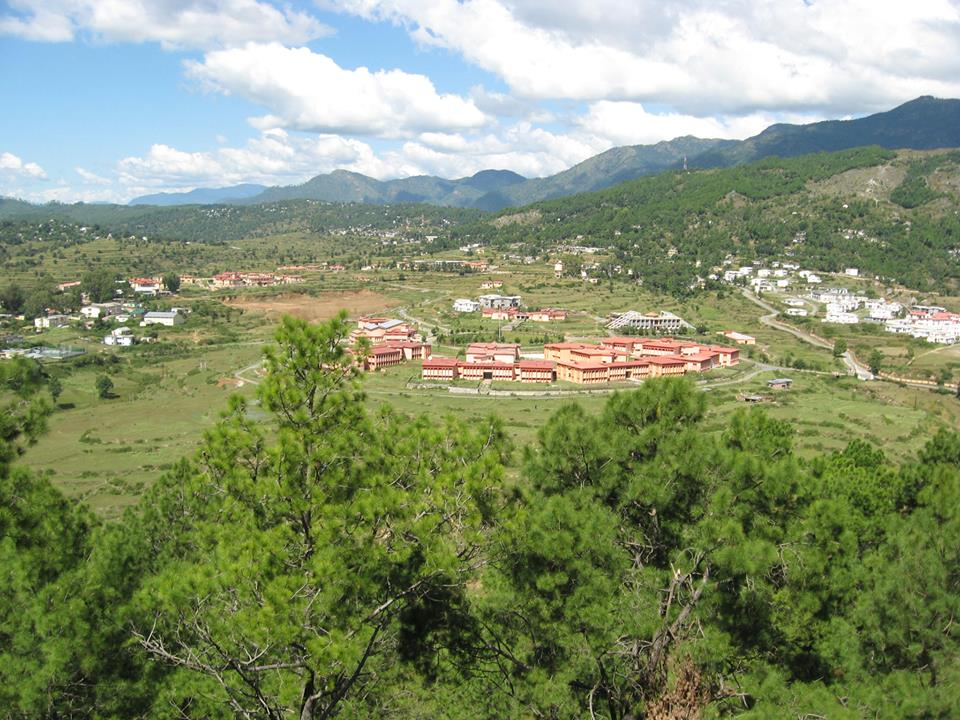
- View of Dwarahat in Almora district, Uttarakhand, India

- Location in Uttarakhand, India Dwarahat (India)
- Coordinates: 29.78°N 79.43°E
- Country: India
- State: Uttarakhand
- District: Almora
- Elevation: 1,510 m (4,950 ft)

Population (2011)
  - Total: 2,749

Languages
  - Official: Hindi
- Time zone: UTC+5:30 (IST)
- PIN: 263653
- Vehicle registration: UK-01
- Website: uk.gov.in

Dwarahat is a town in the Almora district of Uttarakhand, India. Situated at an elevation of 1,510 meters (4,950 feet) in the Kumaon region, Dwarahat is known for its cultural heritage and historical significance, particularly related to the ancient Katyuri dynasty.

== History ==
Historically, Dwarahat served as the residence for a branch of the Katyuri kings. The former palace of the Katyuri rajas was situated on the Chandragiri (or Chauchari) hill on a rock formation known locally as Tharp. The town is noted for its extensive antiquities, originally boasting around 30 ancient Hindu temples generally dated to the 11th century. However, during the Rohilla invasion of Kumaon, many of these temples were desecrated. By the early 20th century, due to this loss of religious reverence, many of the ruined temple structures had been repurposed by locals as granaries or straw-lofts, and their carved stones were often used to mend agricultural terraces.

Early British Commissioner George William Traill also noted the existence of tombs built with large tiles in Dwarahat, which he theorized were memorials to Mughal colonies left behind during Timur's invasion of India. This theory was historically supported by the presence of date palm (khajur) groves and several localized foreign place names, though the town had no Muslim inhabitants by 1901.

In 1901, the population of Dwarahat was recorded as just 124. Despite its small population, the village served as a regional hub due to its location at an elevation of 5,031 feet (1,533 m) along the intersection of roads leading to Almora, Ranikhet, Garhwal, and Someshwar. By the early 20th century, Dwarahat's infrastructure included a post office, a dispensary, and an active American Mission colony that supported both an English middle school and a girls' school.

== Geography ==
Dwarahat is located at 29.78°N 79.43°E.

== Demographics ==
Dwarahat is a Nagar Panchayat city in district of Almora, Uttarakhand. The Dwarahat city is divided into 4 wards for which elections are held every 5 years. The Dwarahat Nagar Panchayat has a population of 2,749 of which 1,378 are males while 1,371 are females as per a report released by Census India 2011. The population of Children with age 0-6 is 310 which is 11.28% of the total population of Dwarahat (NP). In Dwarahat Nagar Panchayat, the female sex ratio is 995 against the state average of 963. Moreover, the child sex ratio in Dwarahat is around 813 compared to the Uttarakhand state average of 890. The literacy rate of Dwarahat City is 92.82% higher than the state average of 78.82%. In Dwarahat, male literacy is around 96.93% while the female literacy rate is 88.80%. Dwarahat Nagar Panchayat has a total administration of over 668 houses to which it supplies basic amenities like water and sewerage. It is also authorized to build roads within Nagar Panchayat limits and impose taxes on properties coming under its jurisdiction.

== Education ==
A Government Engineering College Bipin Tripathi Kumaon Institute of Technology was established in 1991 in Dwarahat. A Polytechnic College, PG College, Dwarahat Inter College Dwarahat, Govt. Inter college, Government Girls Inter College, M.D. Tiwari High School Dwarahat, Dunagiri Modern School, Dr Leeladhar Bhatt Vivekanand Vidya Mandir Inter College Dwarahat, Kumaon Public School Dwarahat, Universal Convent School Dwarahat, and Saraswati Shishu Mandir Dwarahat are situated here.

== Culture ==
Dwarahat is also known as Sanskritik Nagari (Cultural heritage) where many temples were constructed by Katyuri Kings in the 7th to 11th Century (Which has as many as 55 ancient temples). There are hundreds of big & small temples in Dwarahat. Dunagiri Temple is the most famous among them. There is also a Kedarnath and a Badrinath temple there, which were constructed by Katyuri kings. Ratandev, Maha Mrityunjay, Gurjardev, and other temples were also constructed by the Katyuris.

The ancient temples of Dwarahat were constructed in a pyramidal form, typically ornamented with rows of simple molding and surmounted by a finial resembling a cap. Local tradition ascribes the principal temples to Adi Shankara. The most prominent among those still in use is the Badrinath temple, which is historically connected to the greater Badrinath shrine in Garhwal. The original deity image was desecrated by the Rohillas and subsequently replaced with a modern one, though several surrounding minor idols bear ancient Saka era dates (such as 1048 CE).

Another notable site is the elaborately carved temple near the Syalde Pokhar (tank). Though heavily weathered, its friezes depict gods, humans, and elephants. The Syalde tank was traditionally the gathering place for the Syalde clan of Rajputs, who would assemble annually in the month of Baisakh to engage in bagwali—a form of mimic warfare historically fought with slings and stones, which was later banned due to serious injuries. Other historical temple groups include the seven temples of Ratnadewal, the deserted Mritunjaya temple, and a row of pillared structures known as the Kachahri-ki-dewal (Court temples). Local village deities, such as Haru and Latu, were worshipped at the Tharp-tilah shrine with frenzied, supposedly prophetic dancing.

Dwarahat is also known as the branch ashram of the Yogoda Satsanga Society of India, known as Yogoda Satsanga Sakha Ashram, Dwarahat. It carries on many charitable activities including eye camps and a school, plus teaches Kriya Yoga.
