= Nanda Bhanar =

Mountain in Uttarakhand, India

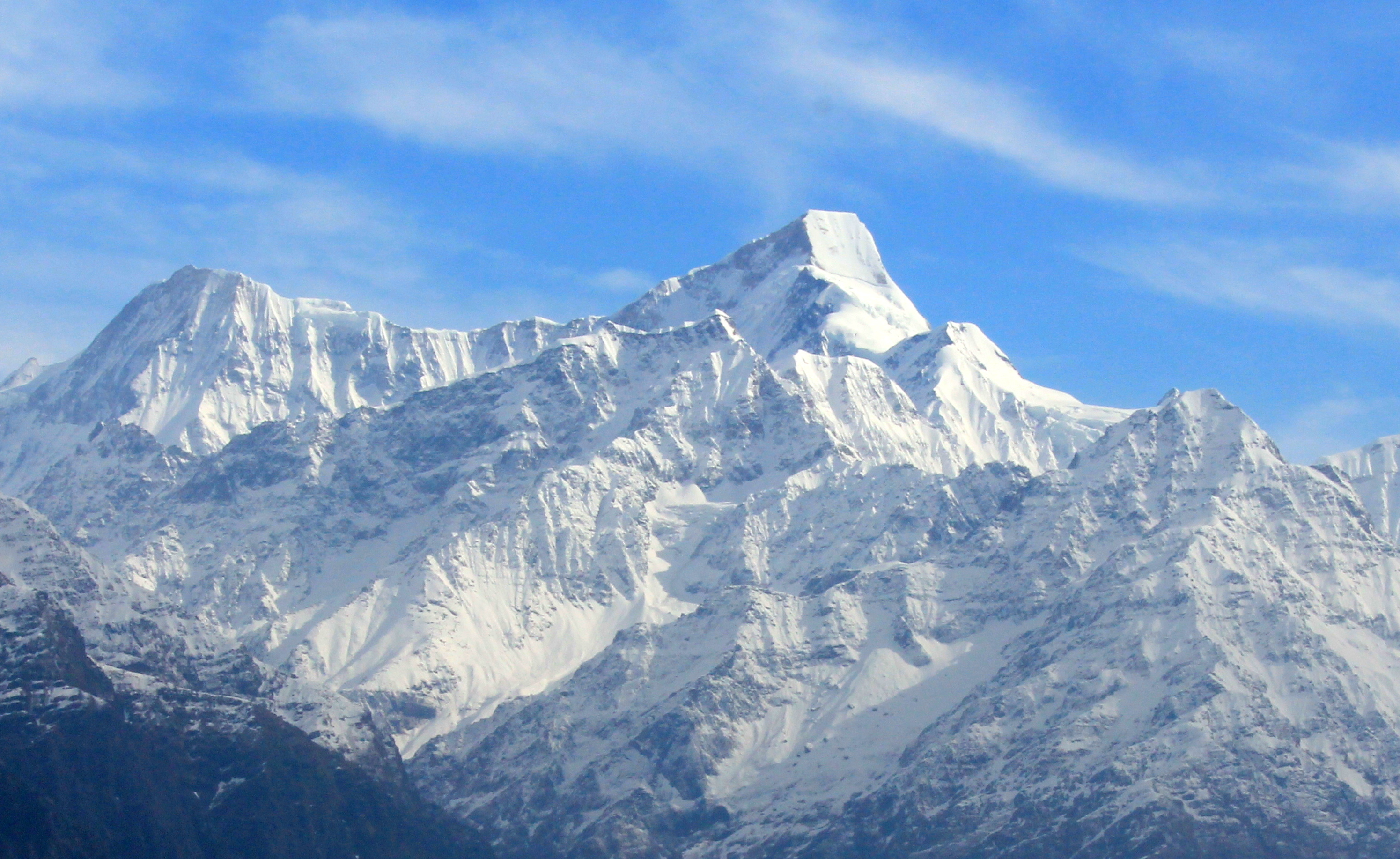
- Nanda Bhanar Right of Nanda Kot

Highest point
- Elevation: 6,236 m (20,459 ft)
- Prominence: 135 m (443 ft)
- Coordinates: 30°15′52″N 80°03′46″E

Geography
- Location within Uttarakhand
- Location: Pithoragarh Uttarakhand, India
- Parent range: Kumaun Himalaya

Climbing
- First ascent: An Indo-British expedition team led by Geoff Hornby made the first ascent of Nanda Bhanar in 1987.

Nanda Bhanar is a mountain of the Kumaun Himalaya in Uttarakhand India. The elevation of Nanda Bhanar is 6,236 metres (20,459 ft) and its prominence is 135 metres (443 ft). It is joint 134th highest located entirely within the Uttrakhand. Nanda Devi, is the highest mountain in this category. It lies 1.7 km SSW of Nanda Kot 6,861 metres (22,510 ft) its nearest higher neighbor. Dangthal 6,050 metres (19,849 ft) lies 5.5 km SSE and it is 15.2 km SSE of Nanda Devi 7,816 metres (25,643 ft). It lies 10.8 km north of Panwali Dwar 6,663 metres (21,860 ft).

== Climbing history ==
An Indo-British expedition team led by Geoff Hornby made the first ascent of Nanda Bhanar in 1987 from Pindari valley. Their original plan to attempt Changuch from the south. There are three previous Indian attempts to climbed Nanda-bhannar but all failed. John McKeever and Aqil Chaudhury first climbed to Nanda-bhanar's summit followed by Jonathan Preston. The team comprising John McKeever, Aqil Chaudhury, Rajsekhar Ghosh, Bivujit Mukhoty, Duncan Hornby and Jonathan Preston.

A four-member team from Bombay led by Divyesh Muni climbed Nanda Bhanar in 1992. It was the second ascent of this peak. The team consisted of three ladies Mrs Immai Hu, Ms. Chetna Rana, and Mrs Vineeta Muni. supported by two H.A.P.S from Manali Yograj Thakur and Koylu Ram. They approached from Munsiari, Lilam, Bugdiar, Martoli and Shalang gad. They established three camps from camp three they first climbed Nandakhani (6029 m) on 15 October. On 16 October they stated at 7.30 A.M. they reached the summit at 10.45 A.M.

== Neighboring and subsidiary peaks ==
Neighboring or subsidiary peaks of Nanda Bhanar:

- Nanda Devi: 7,816 m (25,643 ft)30°55′12″N 79°35′30″E
- Nanda Kot: 6,861 m (22,510 ft)30°16′48″N 80°04′12″E
- Dangthal 6,050 m (19,849 ft)30°13′33″N 80°05′50″E
- Panwali Dwar 6,663 m (21,860 ft)30°17′22″N 79°57′21″E
- Nandakhani: 6,029 m (19,780 ft)30°15′42″N 80°04′22″E

== Glaciers and rivers ==
Nanda Bhanar stands between Shalang Glacier on the eastern side and Pindari Glacier on the western side. On the southern side guards the Kafni Glacier. Shalang glacier flows from south-west to south-east and joins Goriganga River that later joins the Kali River at Jauljibi. On the southern side from Kafni glacier emerges Kafni river and after a short run it joins Pindari river at Dwali. On the western side Pindari Glacier flows down from north to south and from the snout of Pindari glacier emerges Pindari River that later joins Alaknanda at Karnaprayag. Alaknanda River is one of the main tributaries of river Ganga that later joins Bhagirathi River the other main tributaries of river Ganga at Devprayag and became Ganga there after.

== See also ==
- List of Himalayan peaks of Uttarakhand
