= Nandakhani =

Mountain in Uttarakhand, India

- Location within Uttarakhand

Highest point
- Elevation: 6,029 m (19,780 ft)
- Prominence: 69 m (226 ft)
- Coordinates: 30°15′42″N 80°04′22″E

Geography
- Location: Pithoragarh Uttarakhand, India
- Parent range: Kumaun Himalaya

Climbing
- First ascent: An Indo-British expedition team led by Geoff Hornby made the first ascent of Nandakhani in 1987.

Nandakhani is a mountain of the Kumaun Himalaya in Uttarakhand India. The elevation of Nandakhani is 6,029 metres (19,780 ft) and its prominence is 69 metres (226 ft). It is 169th highest located entirely within the Uttrakhand. Nanda Devi, is the highest mountain in this category. It lies .932 km SE of Nanda Bhanar 6,236 metres (20,459 ft) its nearest higher neighbor. Dangthal 6,050 metres (19,849 ft) lies 4.6 km SSE and it is 2.2 km SSE of Nanda Kot 6,861 metres (22,510 ft). It lies 19.2 km east of Maiktoli 6,803 metres (22,320 ft).

== Climbing history ==
An Indo-British expedition team led by Geoff Hornby made the first ascent of Nandakhani in 1987, approaching from Pindari valley. Their original plan to attempt Changuch from the south. John McKeever alone climbed to Nandakhani's summit after returning from Nanda Bhanar climb. The team comprising John McKeever, Aqil Chaudhury, Rajsekhar Ghosh, Bivujit Mukhoty, Duncan Hornby and Jonathan Preston.

A four member team from Bombay led by Divyesh Muni climbed Nanda Bhanar in 1992. The team

consisted of three ladies Mrs Immai Hu, Ms. Chetna Rana, and Mrs Vineeta Muni. supported by two H.A.P.S from Manali Yograj Thakur and Koylu Ram. They approached from Munsiari, Lilam, Bugdiar, Martoli and Shalang gad. They established three camps from camp three they first climbed Nandakhani (6029 m) on 16 October. On the 16th they reach Camp 3, by 12.30 p.m. they pitched there camp and after a drink they started by 1.45 p.m. By 3.20 p.m. they were at the top. They were back at the camp by 4.30 p.m. On 16 October they stated at 7.30 A.M. they reached the summit at 10.45 A.M. It was second ascent of this peak.

== Neighboring and subsidiary peaks ==
Neighboring or subsidiary peaks of Nandakhani:

- Nanda Devi: 7,816 m (25,643 ft)30°55′12″N 79°35′30″E
- Nanda Kot: 6,861 m (22,510 ft)30°16′48″N 80°04′12″E
- Dangthal 6,050 m (19,849 ft)30°13′33″N 80°05′50″E
- Panwali Dwar 6,663 m (21,860 ft)30°17′22″N 79°57′21″E
- Nanda Bhanar: 6,236 m (20,459 ft)30°15′52″N 80°03′46″E

== Glaciers and rivers ==
Nandakhani stands between Shalang Glacier on the eastern side and Pindari Glacier on the western side. On the southern side guards the Kafni Glacier. Shalang glacier flows from south-west to south-east and joins Goriganga River that later joins the Kali River at Jauljibi. On the southern side from Kafni glacier emerges Kafni river and after a short run it joins Pindari river at Dwali. On the western side Pindari Glacier flows down from north to south and from the snout of Pindari glacier emerges Pindari River that later joins Alaknanda at Karnaprayag. Alaknanda River is one of the main tributaries of river Ganga that later joins Bhagirathi River the other main tributaries of river Ganga at Devprayag and became Ganga there after.

== See also ==
- List of Himalayan peaks of Uttarakhand
