= Kulsari =

- Village
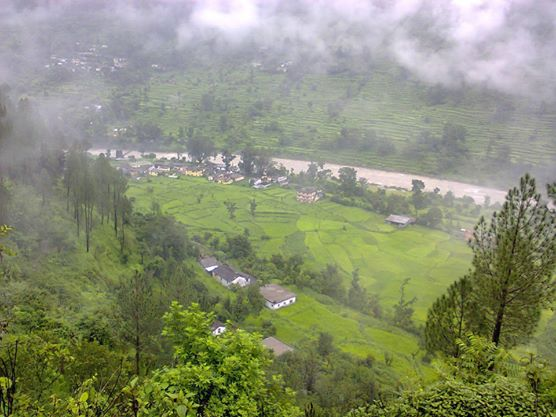

- Location in Uttarakhand, India Kulsari (India)
- Coordinates: 30°5′N 79°27′E
- Country: India
- State: Uttarakhand
- District: Chamoli
- Tehsil: Tharali

Languages
  - Official: Hindi
  - Regional: Garhwali
- Time zone: UTC+5:30 (IST)

Kulsari (Garhwali :kulsāír) a village on the bank of the Pindar river in Chamoli district, 25 km from Gwaldam. The temple of Kulsari is a State Protected Monument in Uttarakhand. Tharali is the Tehsil headquarters. Kulsari is surrounded by Tharali Tehsil to the East, Gairsain Tehsil to the west, Ghat Tehsil to the North and Dewal Tehsil to the East. Kulsari is also a destination during the Nanda Devi Raj Jat pilgrimage.

== See also ==
- Badhangarhi temple
- Gwaldam
- Lolti
- Karanpryag
