= Lolti =

- Village
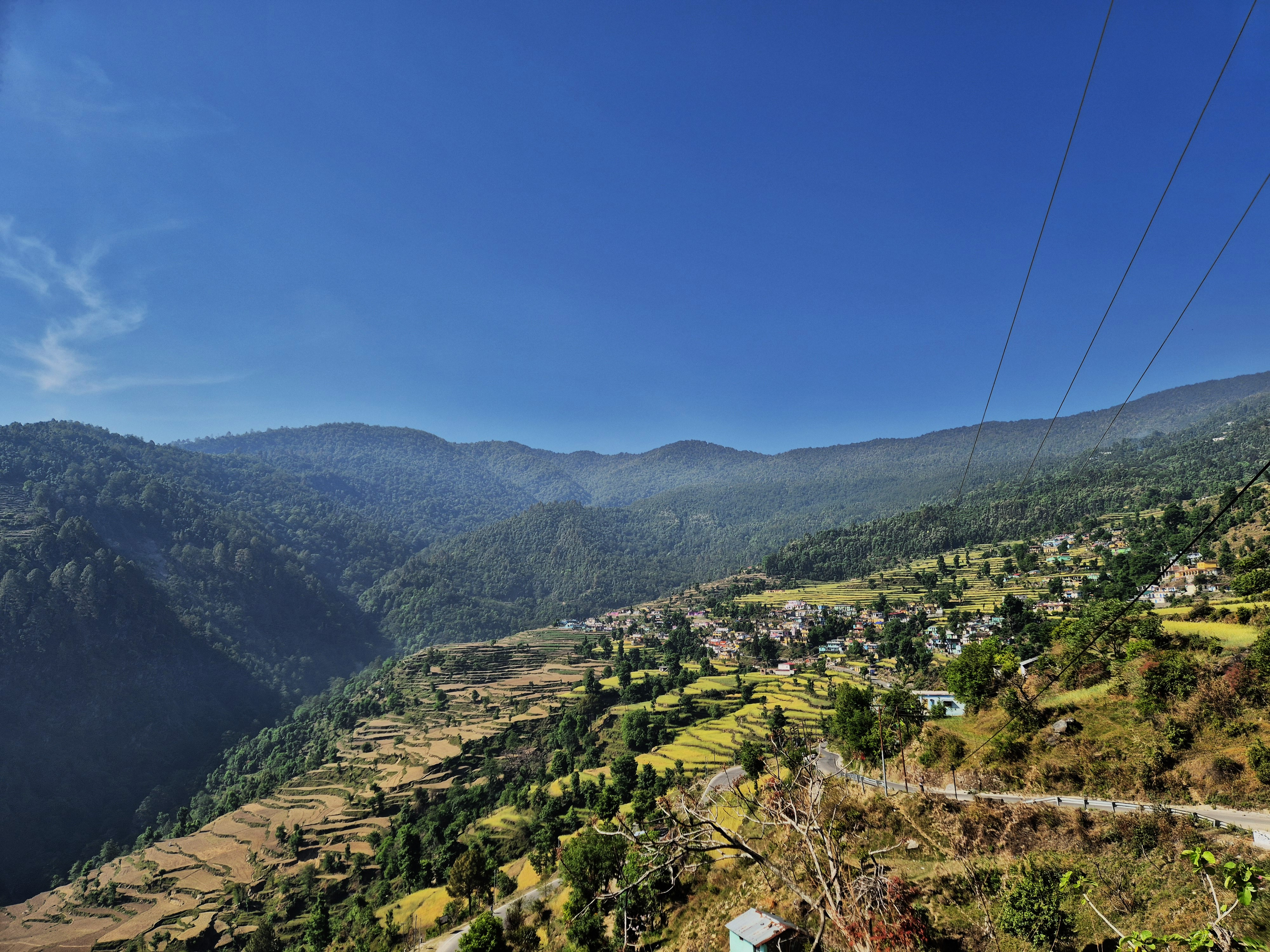
- View of Lolti village

- Location in Uttarakhand, India
- Coordinates: 30°03′17″N 79°29′57″E
- Country: India
- State: Uttarakhand
- District: Chamoli
- Tehsil: Tharali

Population (2011)
  - Total: 1,023

Languages
  - Official: Hindi, Garhwali
- Time zone: UTC+5:30 (IST)
- PIN: 246482
- Vehicle registration: UK 11

Lolti is a village in the Tharali tehsil of Chamoli district in Uttarakhand, India. It is located on the Simli-Gwaldam-Almora Highway. It is 10 km (6.2 mi) from Kulsari, the famous camp station of Nanda Devi Raj Jat, and 15 km (9.3 mi) from the 15 km (9.3 mi) from famous tourist spot Gwaldam. It is located in the Pindar River Valley.

== Flora and Fauna ==
The area is surrounded by lush green forests and is home to a wide variety of flora and fauna. Commonly found trees include Banj (Quercus leucotrichophora), Buransh (Rhododendron), Pine(locally known as Soi), and Poplar (Populus). The region also bears wild fruits such as Kafal and wild berries.

== Agriculture ==
Villagers actively engage in farming, cultivating grains and vegetables like wheat, rice, maize, ragi, potatoes, and pulses.

== Education ==
The village has one government school, Rajkiya Vidyalaya Lolti, which provides intermediate-level education. The nearest higher education institution is Government Degree College Talwari, located about 5 km away in an area along the foothills nourished by the Pindar River and offering views of the Trishul range of the Himalayas.

== Demographics ==
As of the 2011 Census of India, Lolti is a medium size village with total 235 families residing. The Lolti village has population of 1,023 of which 475 are males while 548 are females. The total geographical area of village is 633.7 hectares (1,566 acres).

== See also ==
- Gwaldam
- Kulsari
- Badhangarhi temple
