= Gwaldam =

- Town
- A view of Trisul from Gwaldam

- Location in Uttarakhand, India Gwaldam (India)
- Coordinates: 30.02°N 79.57°E
- Country: India
- State: Uttarakhand
- District: Chamoli
- Tehsil: Tharali

Area
  - Total: 1.2526 km^{2} (0.4836 sq mi)
- Elevation: 1,940 m (6,360 ft)

Population 1557 males and 1363 females in 690 households. Literacy percent is 78% (Census 2011)
  - Total: 2,920
  - Density: 2,330/km^{2} (6,040/sq mi)

Language
  - Official: Hindi
  - Regional: Garhwali
- Time zone: UTC+5:30 (IST)
- Postal code: 246441
- Vehicle registration: UK 11
- Website: uk.gov.in

Gwaldam is a hill station in India, situated between the Garhwal and Kumaon divisions, 39 km (24 mi) from Kausani.

== Geography ==
Gwaldam is located at 30.02°N 79.57°E. It has an average elevation of 1,940 m (6,360 ft). It is 20 km (12 mi) from Baijnath, capital of medieval Katyuri kings and 25 km (16 mi) from Kulsari the famous camp station of Nanda Devi Raj Jat.

It serves as a base camp for trekkers who enter from Kathgodam (Nainital) railhead on trekking route to Lord Curzon Trail (Kuari Pass), Nanda Devi Raj Jat and Roopkund.

== History ==
A number of battles were fought here in past. Due to the town being on a strategic point on the border, it remained contested between the Garhwal and Kumaon kings. Gwaldam is situated at the saddle of Gwaldam-Shisakhani ridge and Gwaldam-Badhangarhi ridge. Later Katyuri kings, who hailed from Joshimath had sympathy for King of Garhwal because of lineage. King of Badhangarhi was under the king of Garhwal and was not in good terms with the King of Kumaon. All these led to a situation between Kumaon and Garhwal kings. In order to intimidate the king of Badhangarhi, Chand king sent Parkhu, a great warrior. Unfortunately, the line of supply was cut short by the Katyuri king and Parkhu was beheaded at Binayakdhar, perhaps nearby crossroad at Gwaldam. King of Garhwal rewarded the soldier who brought the head to Shrinagar. This infuriated the Chand king Rudra Chand and he personally led the troops and captured and killed the Katyuri king Sukhal Deo and exiled his family.

Because of its strategic importance a base camp of Indo-Tibetan Border Police was established in the 1960s and SSB training center was established in the 1970s. At present a small unit of SSB is present at Gwaldam that runs occasional training courses. Major activities were shifted elsewhere.

A hydro-electric power project of 252 MW is under construction. The location of the project is at Nandkesari on the river Pindar, a tributary of the holy river Ganga.

The nearest railway station is at Kathgodam, 180 km (110 mi) away and the nearest airport is at Gauchar at 78 km (48 mi) away.

== See also ==
- Lolti
- Kulsari
- Badhangarhi temple
