= Kuchela Dhura =

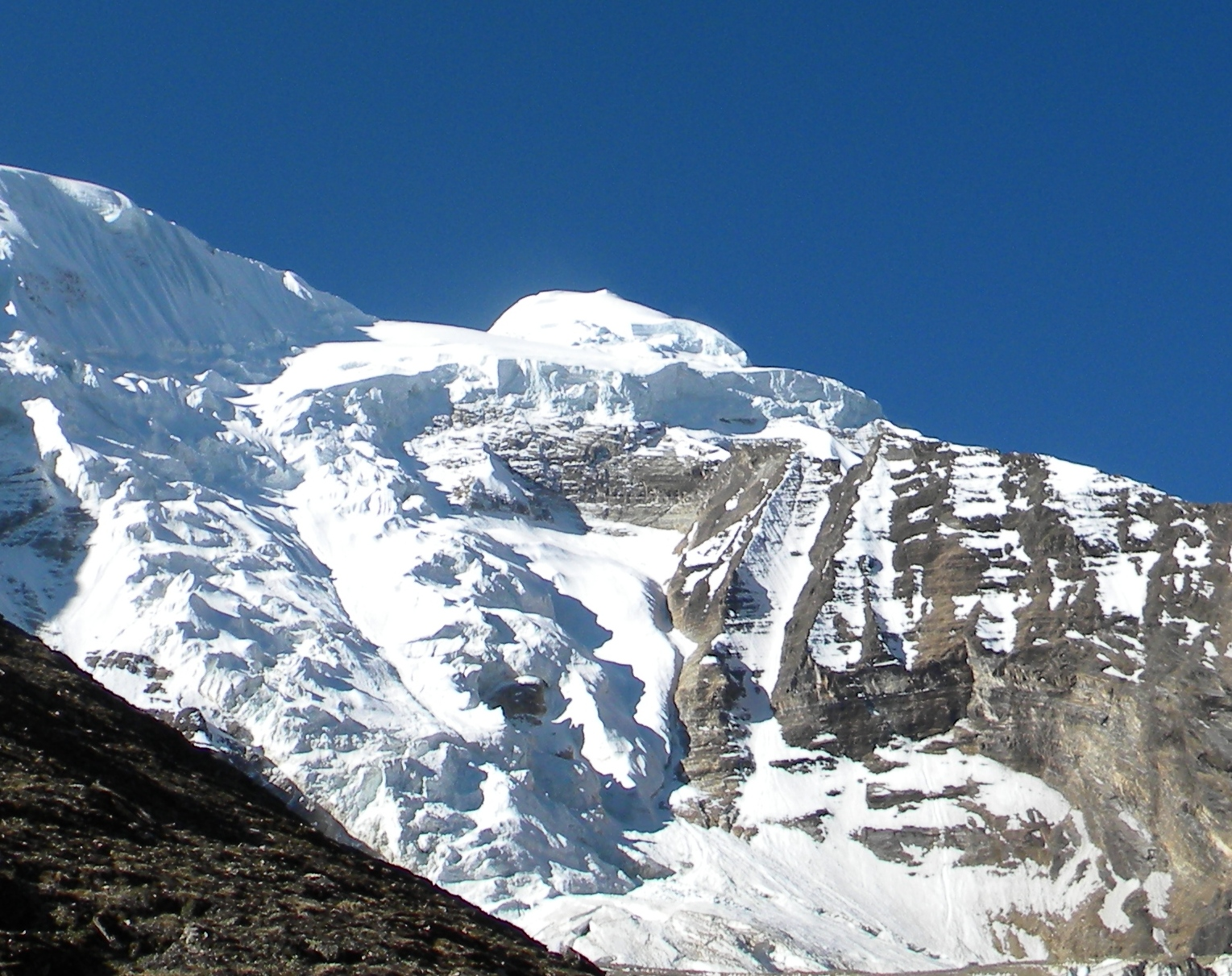
- Kuchela Dhura

Highest point
- Elevation: 6,294 m (20,650 ft) (Note: Sources differ with regard to the exact maximum elevation of the peak, with 6,294m being cited prior to the ascent in 2013, which then cites 6,250m.)
- Coordinates: 30°18′22.2″N 80°05′19.6″E

Geography
- Location within India
- Location: Pithoragarh, Uttarakhand, India
- Parent range: Kumaon Himalaya

Climbing
- First ascent: Dhruv Joshi 6 September 2013

Mount Kuchela Dhura is a mountain located in Pithoragarh, Uttarakhand, India. It is located at the near true right bank of Lwa Glacier or true left bank of Shalang glacier, surrounded by Mount Nandakot, 6861 metres and 6041 metres to its south-west and north-east respectively. This peak offers a 3 km (approx.) long rutted ridge leading to Nanda Kot’s north face.

An unknown attempt was made in the late 1980s, and no information of route and team. Later, an 8 member team attempted the peak via the west ridge during pre-monsoon season in 2012, reaching 6206m.

The Indian Mountaineering Foundation (IMF) sent an expedition in August–September 2013 to Mt Kuchela Dhura. The core Indian team had total 10 members: Dhruv Joshi from Almora(leader), Wallambok Lyngdoh from Shillong (Dy. Leader), Dr Anand Vaidya from Gujarat (Medical Officer), Ram Prasad Lodha (Rajasthan), Zoram sanga(Mizoram), Vineet Saini(U.P), Vijay Rautela(Uttarakhand), Banshngainlang Nongkynrih(Meghalaya), Karan Kumar Shandilya (Assam) and Chitramohan Singh (Uttarakhand). Four members, Dhruv Joshi, Wallambok Lyngdoh, Chitramohan, and Vijay Rautela successfully scaled the mountain on 6 September 2013 at 8:20 AM to make the first international and national ascent of the peak.

The expedition was flagged off by Col (Rtd) J P Bhagatjee on 15 August 2013, Director IMF and flagged in by Mick Fowler (Legendary Mountaineer and President of Alpine Club) on 20 September 2013. This expedition was sponsored by the IMF, Ministry of Youth Affairs & sports.

Main peaks around Kuchela Dhura:

- Changuch, 6,322 m (20,741 ft)
- Nanda Kot, 6,861 m (22,510 ft)
- Nanda Devi East, 7,434 m (24,390 ft)
