= Kafni Glacier =

Glacier in Uttarakhand, India

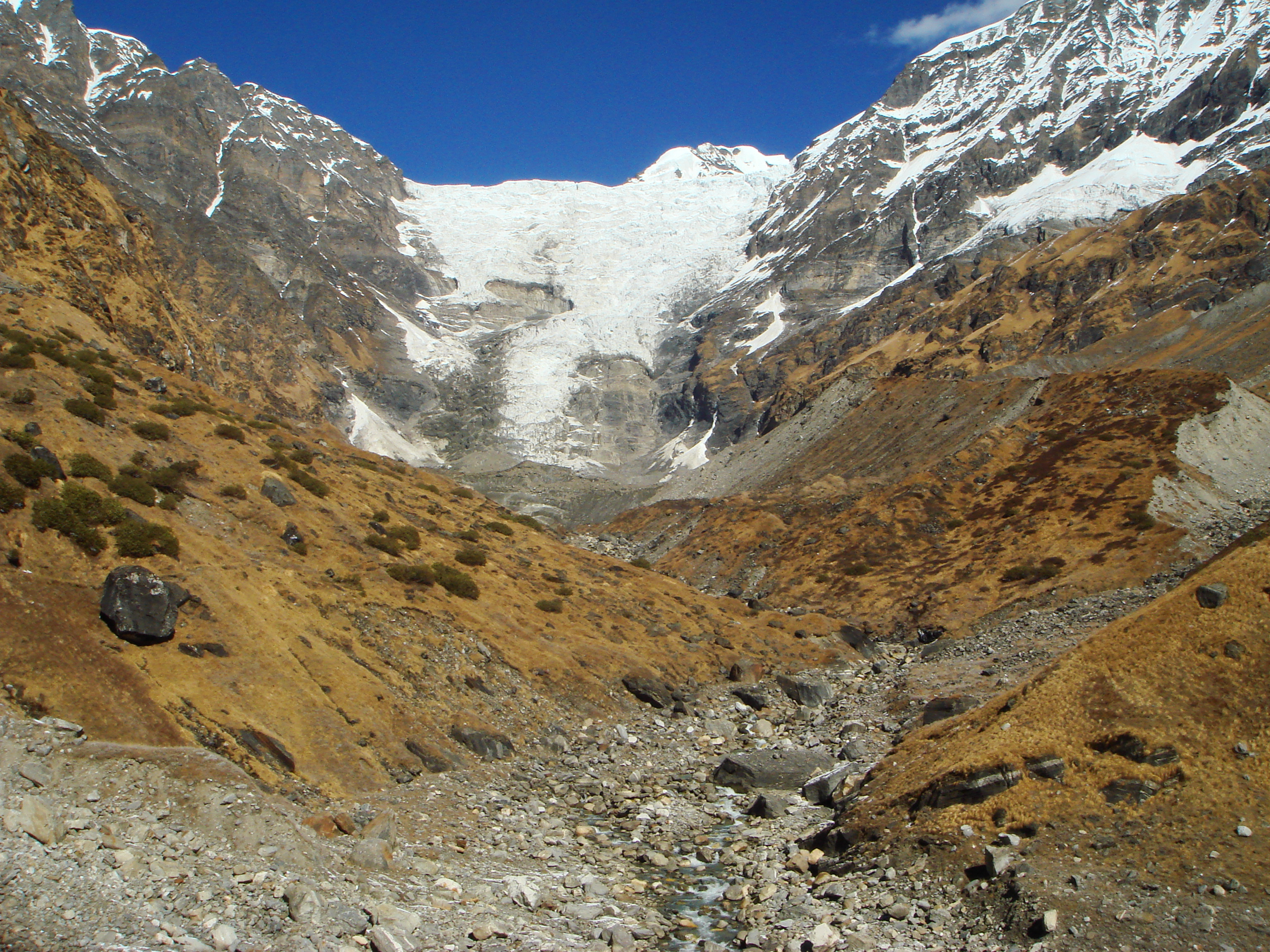
- Kafni Glacier from zero point

- Location within Uttarakhand Location within India
- Interactive map of Kafni Glacier
- Type: Mountain glacier
- Location: Kumaon Himalayas, Uttarakhand, India
- Coordinates: 30°13′05″N 80°03′20″E
- Length: Approximately 3 kilometres (2 mi)

The Kafni Glacier is located in the upper reaches of the Kumaon Himalayas, to the southeast of Nanda Devi. The glacier gives rise to the Kafni River, which is a tributary of the Pindar River. The Pindar River is a tributary to Alaknanda River, which eventually is one of the two headstreams of the Ganges. This is relatively small glacier but a popular trekking destination along with Pindari Glacier.

== List of peaks nearby ==
A list of notable peaks adjacent to, near to or seen on the Kafni Glacier Trek includes:

- Nanda Kot, 6,861 m (22,510 ft)
- Changuch ( 6322m )
- Maiktoli ( 6803m )
- Mrigthuni ( 6855m )
- Nanda Devi ( 7816m )
- Nanda Khat ( 6611m )
- Panwali Dwar ( 6663m )
- Sunanda Devi ( 7434m )
- Tharkot ( 6099m )
- Nanda Bhanar ( 6236m )
- Nanda Khani ( 6029m )
- Bauljuri ( 5922m )
- Lapsa Dhura ( 6000m )

== List of glaciers nearby ==
A list of notable glaciers adjacent to or near the Kafni Glacier includes:

- Pindari Glacier
- Milam Glacier
- Maiktoli Glacier

Kafni Glacier trek route

== Trek Route ==
The glacier is located in Bageshwar district. From Bageshwar town it can be approached via route of Bharadi, Saung, Loharkhet, Dhakuri Pass, Khati, Dwali and Khatiya. The route until Loharkhet is motorable, after which it is approximately a 90 km (56 mi) round trip. Khati is the last village on the route. Though Pindari is more popular tourist destination, some people find route to this glacier more beautiful. Unlike Pindari, tourists can trek up to the glacier. In case of Pindari, the trek beyond zero point becomes very tough and cannot be done without proper equipment.

== See also ==
- List of glaciers
