= Pratibha Naitthani =

Dr. Pratiba Naitthani
- Born: Mumbai, India
- Citizenship: India
- Occupations: Professor at St. Xavier's College (Autonomous), Mumbai
- Organization(s): St. Xavier's College (Autonomous), Mumbai; Reconstructive Surgery Foundation
- Awards: 2007 Outstanding Woman of Mumbai 2005 Power Goddess of India by India Today

Dr. Pratiba Naitthani is an Indian professor and activist. She is known for her opposition of vulgarity and violence on Indian television.

== Early life ==
Pratiba Naitthani was born in Mumbai, India, her family is from Pauri Garhwal, Uttarakhand. Her father, Professor Dr. S. S. Naitthani, was a pioneer of the Hindi department at Bombay University and St. Xavier's College. Pratiba is best known for her Public Interest Litigation (PIL) filed in the Bombay High Court (PIL no. 1232) in 2004, against the broadcast of all adult films and programmes on television channels. Due to her efforts, even international channels had to adhere to the programming code of India. The Bombay High Court passed various orders in her PIL, compelling the private channels to follow the Indian laws.

== Career ==
Pratiba Naitthani is currently based in Mumbai, where she is an Associate Professor and Head of the Political Science Department in St. Xavier's College. Besides her work as a professor and department head, she is concerned with, and works on issues related to welfare of women, children, and tribal people. In Mumbai, she is a member of the Reconstructive Surgery Foundation, a voluntary organisation which offers free plastic and reconstructive surgery to economically underprivileged people. The Reconstructive Surgery Foundation primarily provides this service to children and people who have suffered burns, injuries from accidents, other physical deformities present since birth, or who are the victims of acid attacks.

She has been instrumental in taking up the issue of advertisements that depict actions which might prove fatal if copied by children, and also issues of indecent representation of women in the media.

She is also part of the struggle of tribal residents in Uttarakhand fighting for their traditional rights against the conservation policies of the state government.

She is a Rajasthani folk singer and has albums to her credit. She has been to 16 countries in the world as a cultural representative for the Rajasthani Ghoomar group. Along with the group, she conducts workshops to promote Rajasthani songs, dance and culture.

Pratiba Naitthani has been the only non-Rajasthani singer who had the honour of singing and recording the state song of the Udaipur royal family- "Mharo Vir Shiromani Des".

== Awards and honors ==
In 2000, Pratiba Naitthani was among the first 7 women who participated in the Nanda Devi Raj Jat, a pilgrimage of Nanda Devi Parvati in Uttarakhand. It is held once every 13 to 16 years. Previously, women were generally not allowed to participate in this pilgrimage which is 280 km long, going up to the altitude of 17,500 feet above sea level to be completed on foot in 22 days.

She was among the 29 women selected by India Today in 2005 as Power Goddesses of India. Besides many awards for her contribution in the field of social service and media issues, she has been awarded the prestigious Panna Dai Award by Maharana Mewar Foundation, Udaipur for going beyond the call of duty for social service.

She has also been honoured by the Mayor of Mumbai on International Women’s Day in 2007 as the "Outstanding Woman of Mumbai city".
