= Tharali =

Tehsil in Uttarakhand's Chamoli district

Tharali is a tehsil (administrative division) in the Chamoli district of the Indian state of Uttarakhand. It is located on the banks of the Pindar River.

== Geography ==
The tehsil is one of the most populated in Chamoli. It consists of more than 200 villages and towns, including Gwaldam town. Located in the Pindar valley, this area was the border of Kumaun and Garhwal.

It is the home of Nanda Devi of Badhangarhi. It offers views of the Nanda Devi and other Himalaya peaks.

Tharali is known for natural resources, with forests covering a significant portion of the region. Local wildlife species include the Himalayan black bear, musk deer, and leopard.

== Economy ==
It hosts an SSB facility of CI & JW TC. The tehsil also has a proposed Devsari Hydro Power Plant of Satluj Jal Vidyut Nigam Limited.

The economy is primarily agriculture-based, primarily cultivating rice, wheat, and maize.

Tourism is an important economic driver. The tehsil is home to several tourist destinations, and offers passage from the side of Kumaun to the Char Dham, the Kedarnath Temple, and the Nanda Devi National Park. Nearby tourist attractions include Kausani and Bageshwar.

== Transport ==
Tharali is connected to the rest of the state by roads and highways. National Highway 109k connects Karnaprayag to Bageshwar.
