= List of State Protected Monuments in Uttarakhand =

This is a list of State Protected Monuments as officially reported by and available through the website of the Archaeological Survey of India in the Indian state Uttarakhand. The monument identifier is a combination of the abbreviation of the subdivision of the list (state, ASI circle) and the numbering as published on the website of the ASI. 21 State Protected Monuments have been recognized by the ASI in Uttarakhand.

== List of state protected monuments ==
SL. No.	Description	Location	Address	District	Coordinates	Image
S-UT-1	Vaishnav Group of Temples	Deval		Pauri Garhwal	30°08′47″N 78°42′19″E	Vaishnav Group of Temples More images
S-UT-2	Devalgarh Group of Temples	Dawal Garh Khas		Pauri Garhwal	30°13′13″N 78°51′36″E	Devalgarh Group of Temples More images
S-UT-3	Shiv Temple	Paithani		Pauri Garhwal	30°08′53″N 78°59′13″E	Shiv Temple More images
S-UT-4	Shivalaya	Khukurgaon		Pauri Garhwal	30°11′38″N 78°44′42″E	Shivalaya More images
S-UT-5	Lakshmi Narayan Group of Temples	Sumari		Pauri Garhwal	30°12′04″N 78°48′49″E	Lakshmi Narayan Group of Temples More images
S-UT-6	Narayankoti Group of Temples	Narayankoti		Rudraprayag	30°32′39″N 79°04′22″E	Narayankoti Group of Temples More images
S-UT-7	Naala Temple and Stupa	Naala		Rudraprayag	30°32′11″N 79°05′06″E	Upload Photo
S-UT-8	Damyanti Temple	Hiun		Rudraprayag	30°32′21″N 79°04′54″E	Damyanti Temple
S-UT-9	Lakshmi Narayan Group of Temples	Bearangana		Rudraprayag	30°12′30″N 78°57′24″E	Upload Photo
S-UT-10	Vaitarni Group of Temples	Gopeshwar		Chamoli	30°24′57″N 79°18′51″E	Vaitarni Group of Temples More images
S-UT-11	Govind Group of Temples	Simli		Chamoli	30°13′58″N 79°15′27″E	Govind Group of Temples More images
S-UT-12	Kulsari Temple	Kulsari		Chamoli	30°05′26″N 79°27′32″E	Kulsari Temple More images
S-UT-13	Narayan Group of Temple	Deorada		Chamoli	30°03′43″N 79°29′48″E	Upload Photo
S-UT-14	Surya Group of Temples	Ranihat		Tehri Garhwal	30°13′39″N 78°46′09″E	Surya Group of Temples More images
S-UT-15	Rajrajeshwari Temple	Ranihat		Tehri Garhwal	30°13′40″N 78°46′09″E	Rajrajeshwari Temple More images
S-UT-16	Nanda Devi Group of Temples	Bajinga		Tehri Garhwal	30°31′27″N 78°44′51″E	Upload Photo
S-UT-17	Kyark Raithal Group of Temples	Kyark Raithal		Uttarkashi	30°49′18″N 78°36′40″E	Upload Photo
S-UT-18	Jamdagni Temple	Than		Uttarkashi	30°50′29″N 78°15′35″E	Jamdagni Temple More images
S-UT-19	Mahasu Temple	Barkot		Uttarkashi		Upload Photo
S-UT-20	Mahasu Temple	Pujeli		Uttarkashi	30°51′42″N 78°12′02″E	Mahasu Temple More images
S-UT-21	Bhadrakali Temple	Paunti		Uttarkashi	30°48′47″N 78°11′21″E	Upload Photo

== See also ==
- List of Monuments of National Importance in Uttarakhand
