= Badhangarhi Temple =

- Garhwali: भगवती मंदिर
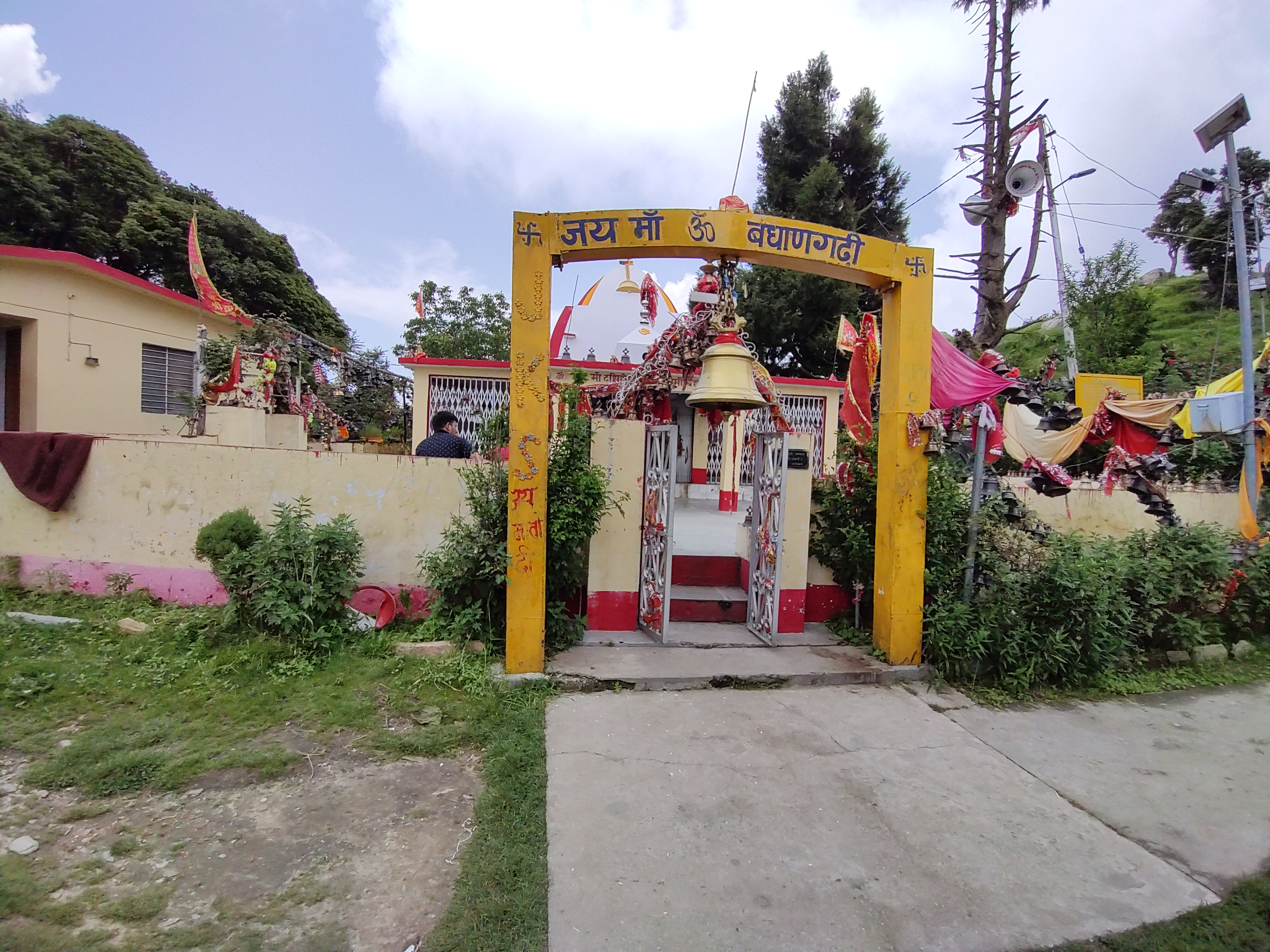
- The temple with steps leading to the entrance

- Location in Uttarakhand

Religion
- Affiliation: Hinduism
- District: Chamoli Garhwal
- Deity: Dakshineshwar kaali(kali)
- Festival: Chaitra asthmi mela

Location
- Location: Badhangarhi
- State: Uttarakhand
- Country: India
- Coordinates: 30.0128°N 79.5229°E

Architecture
- Type: North-Indian Himalayan Architecture
- Elevation: 2,260 m (7,415 ft)

Badhangarhi temple (also known as Maa Badhangarhi Mandir) is an ancient Hindu temple dedicated to Kali, worshipped as Maa Dakshineshwar kaali or Bhagwati. People living in Tharali, Naranbagar, Dewal block of Chamoli and garur, kapkot block of Bageshwar have a great faith in Badhangarhi, a popular deity in this region. It is situated in Tharali tehsil of Chamoli Garhwal district of Uttarakhand. The nearest town to Badhangarhi is Gwaldam which is 8 km from the main Badhangarhi temple. The temple is situated at the elevation of about 2260 m.

== Badhangarhi Name meaning ==
BadhanGarhi name made by Two words combination one is Badhan and another one is Garhi, where Badhan Name meaning is Maa kali and Lord Shiva Temple and Garhi Mean Peak or height. A combination of these two words is BadhanGarhi.

== History ==
This temple was a part of Badhāngarh which is one of the 52 garh of Garhwal situated at the left bank of Pindar river. According to the legends, the original temple was built by katyuri King, who ruled this region from the 8th to 12th century. Badhangarhi is derived from two words: Badhan and garhi, in which Badhan refers to a pargana or of Chamoli Garhwal and garhi refers to a fort, which is situated at the mountain top. This temple is very important from the point of view of history. Because this temple is in the middle of Garhwal and Kumaon, there used to be war in its nearby areas since ancient times. Similarly, in the war of 1670 Baz Bahadur Chand invaded Badhangarh in the Pindar valley and to commemorate his victory, he took away the idol of the Goddess Nanda Devi which was established in the Badhangarhi temple and enshrined that in a temple at the old fort of Almora, which G.W. Traill, then Commissioner of Kumaon, later shifted to the present site. There is a local tradition related to that incident. It is told that Traill was struck with snow-blindness on his visit to the northern part of the province when he was Assistant Commissioner of Kumaon. He was told that it was due to the curse of the Goddess which could only be cured by building a temple for her. He built the temple and was relieved from the curse of Goddess Nanda Devi.

== See also ==
- Nanda Devi Raj Jat
- Gwaldam
