= Changuch =

Himalayan mountain peak in India

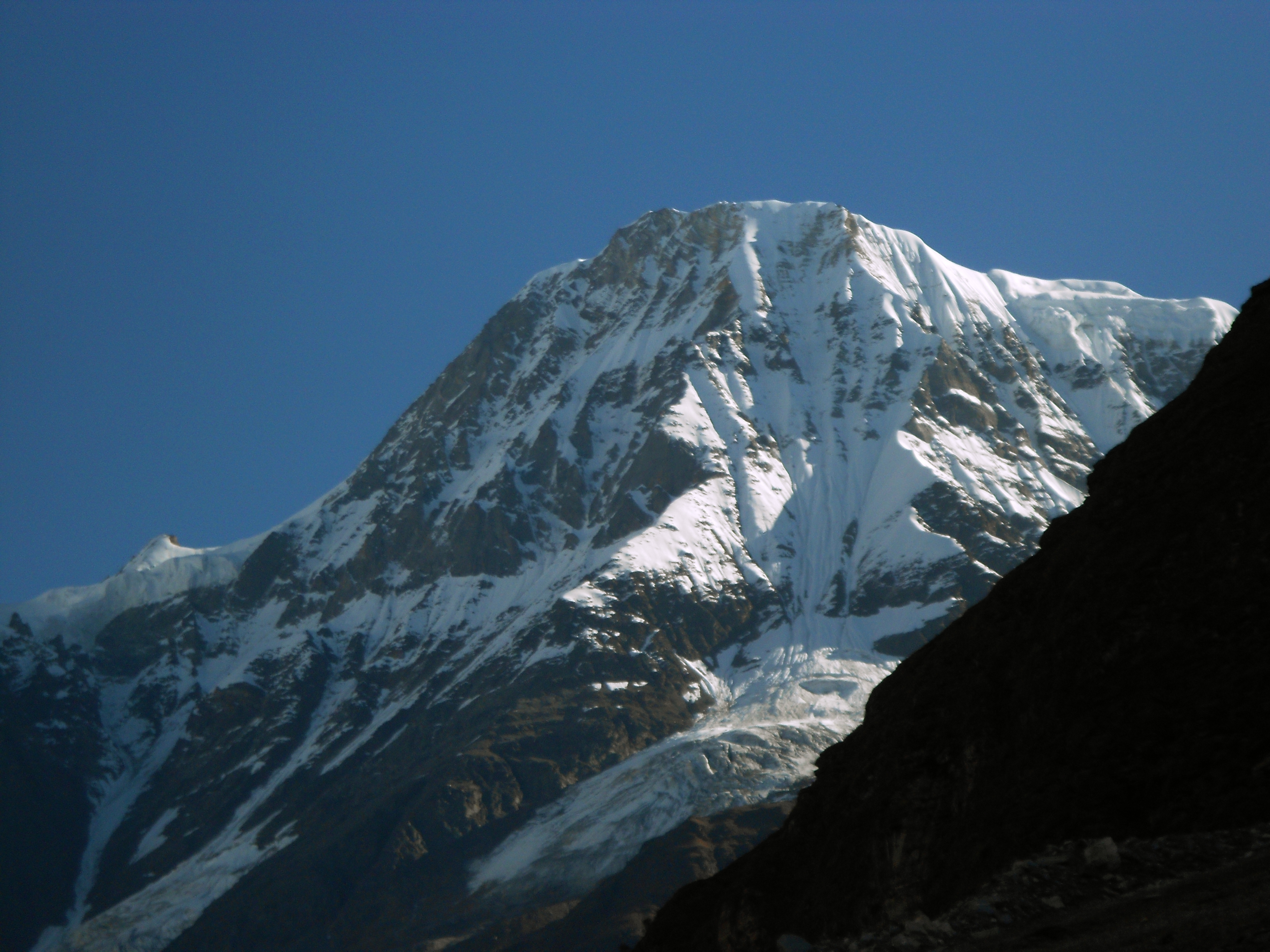
- Changuch

Highest point
- Elevation: 6,322 m (20,741 ft)
- Coordinates: 30°17′24″N 80°02′24″E

Geography
- Location within India
- Location: Pithoragarh, Bageshwar Uttarakhand, India
- Parent range: Kumaon Himalaya

Climbing
- First ascent: Martin Moran 9 June 2009, second ascent by Dhruv Joshi 17 June 2011

Changuch is a Himalayan mountain peak situated at the boundary of Pithoragarh and Bageshwar district of the Uttarakhand state of India. This peak is situated above the Pindari Glacier. This peak offers a ridge leading to Nanda Kot. On its massif Traill's pass is situated, which connects Pindari valley to Goriganga valley. The first successful ascent to the peak was made by an Indo-British team on 9 June 2009 at 9 am.

== Attempts of 1987, 1997, 2007 & 2009 ==
Attempts were made in the years 1987, 1997 and 2007 and all three of them had failed. All these unsuccessful expeditions were through Pindari valley. Indo-British Mt. Changuch Expedition of 1987 was led by B. Mukhoty. They were forced to retreat. The expedition of 1997 was led by G. Murray. This expedition also failed to reach the summit and third attempt for this peak led by navy commander s dam with a joint expedition Indian navy-IMF. the team established summit camp at 5,700 m but The expedition was again unsuccessful due to an avalanche and death of two member at a height of 5,200 m before shifting to summit camp . The two following teams also attempted the peak in 2009. One team led by Basanta Singha Roy. Unlike the British, the seven member team from West Bengal was not successful in climbing the peak. They crossed Trail's pass en route and entered Lawan gad from Pindar valley. They established their summit camp at 5,640 m on 29 August on the northwest ridge connecting Changuch with Nandakhat. Technical difficulties stopped the attempt at that point. Another expedition organised by Altitude High Adventure of 14 members Indian team attempted the peak in the post-monsoon season due to bad weather and snowfall they had to call off the expedition. They reached 300 m above their Camp 2, which was established at 5,180 m.

== British Expedition of 2009 ==
In 2009, a British expedition led by Martin Moran approached the peak from Lawan Valley, an easier route compared to the one taken by previous attempts of 1987, 1997 and 2007 and made a successful ascent on 9 June 2009. Expedition's original target was Nanda Devi East. However, during the course of expedition, due to difficult conditions and lack of resources to meet original target, they shifted the target to the nearby Changuch.

== Indian Expedition of 2011 ==
In 2011 Indian Mountaineering Foundation send an Indian expedition to the peak led by Dhruv Joshi went via Pindari glacier and 5 members made a successful ascent on 17 June 2011 at 0950 am. Expedition consisted of 8 members. The team is as follows: Dhruv Joshi (leader), Dr. Anand Vaidhya (Medical Officer), Wallambok Lyngdoh, Bharat Bhushan, Takpa Norboo, Chetan Pandey, Mahesh S Dharamsaktu & Harish Kumar. No high altitudes porters were employed in this expedition. This is the second ascent of Changuch and first Indian and first from Pindari Glacier side.
