= Pindari Glacier =

Glacier in Kumaon Himalayas

Pindari
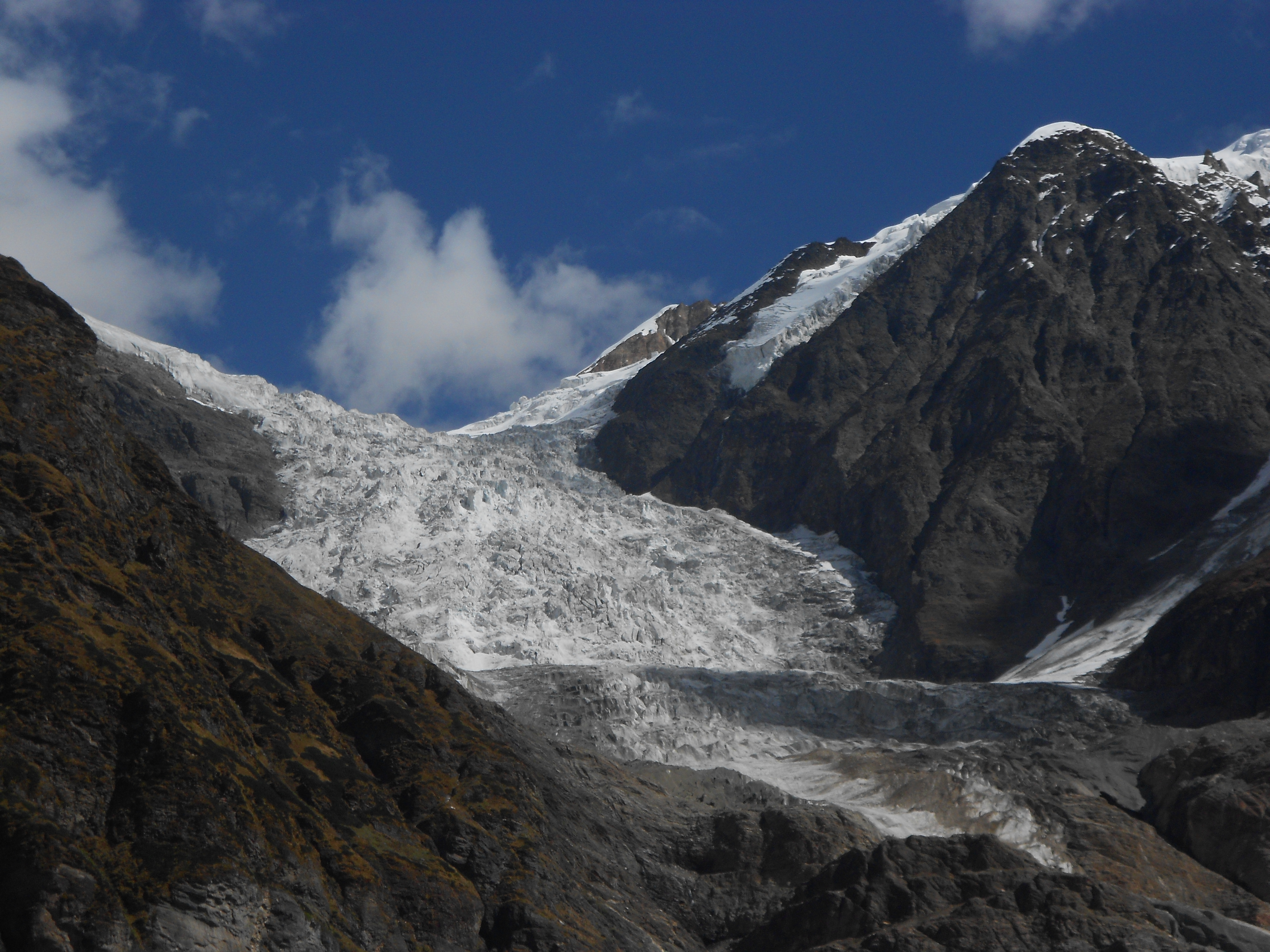
- Pindari glacier

- Location within Uttarakhand Location within India
- Interactive map of Pindari
- Type: Mountain glacier
- Location: Kumaon Himalayas, Uttarakhand, India
- Coordinates: 30°18′N 80°01′E

The Pindari Glacier is a glacier found in the upper reaches of the Kumaon Himalayas, to the southeast of Nanda Devi and Nanda Kot.

== Geography ==
The glacier is about 9 kilometers long and gives rise to the Pindar River which meets the Alakananda at Karnaprayag in the Garhwal district.

The trail to reach the glacier crosses the villages of Saung, Loharkhet, crosses over the Dhakuri Pass, continues onto Khati village (the last inhabited village on the trail), Dwali, Phurkia and finally Zero Point, Pindar, the end of the trail. Though most of the trail is along the banks of the Pindari River, the river is mostly hidden until after Khati.

The Pindari Glacier trail provides for a 90 km (56 mi) round-trip trek that most people find comfortable to complete in 6 days. The Pindari Glacier is also famous for other adventure sports like Ice climbing and Mountain biking.

== Retreat ==
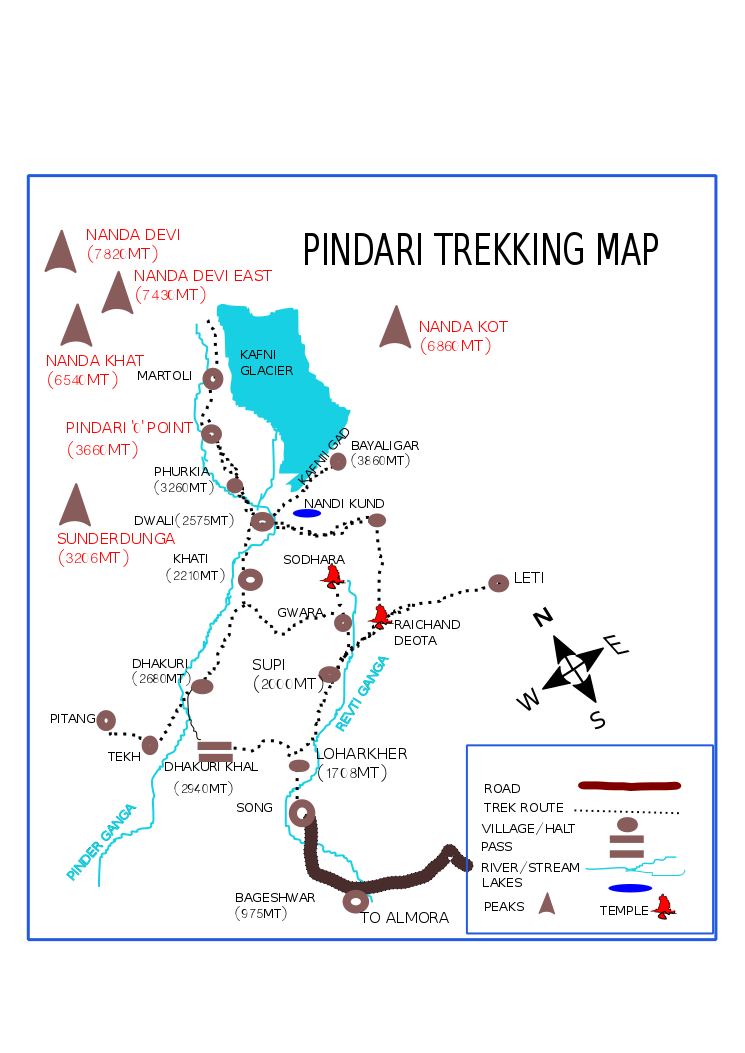
Pindari and Kafni glacier trek Route Map

Several surveys have mapped the retreat of Pindari over the years. The glacier was first surveyed by G.de P.Cotter in 1906. A 1958 survey by Amber P Tiwari and Jangpangi in connection with International Geophysical Year, recorded a retreat of 1,040 m (3,410 ft) in the fifty two years since 1906. A 1966 survey recorded a further retreat of 200 m (660 ft) and discovered that a branch of the glacier, the Chhanguch branch, had separated and formed a separate ice shelf. As a result of the separation, the glacier lost several thousand cubic meters of ice. Recent studies have shown that the glacier has retreated an additional 1,569.01 meters between 1976 and 2014, possibly because of climate change. This accelerating retreat, along with the retreat of other Himalayan glaciers, is likely to have an adverse impact on agriculture in the entire Ganges region since the Pindar river feeds the Alaknanda river, a headstream of the Ganges.

== See also ==
- List of glaciers
- Kafni Glacier
