= Nanda Kot =

Mountain in Uttarakhand, India

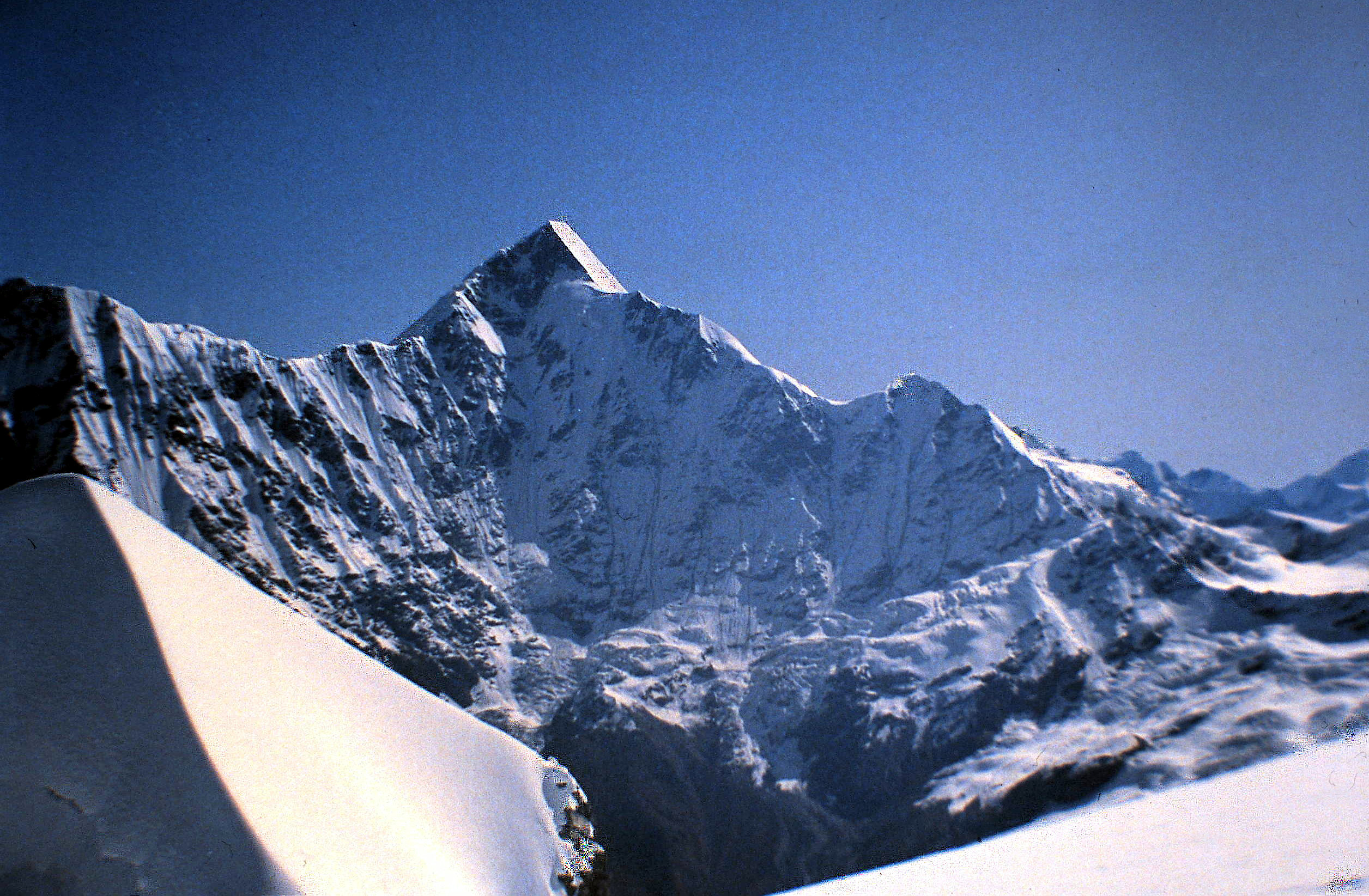

Highest point
- Elevation: 6,861 m (22,510 ft)
- Prominence: 1,592 m (5,223 ft)
- Listing: Ultra
- Coordinates: 30°16′54″N 80°04′06″E

Geography
- Location within India
- Location: Pithoragarh, Uttarakhand, India
- Parent range: Kumaun Himalaya

Climbing
- First ascent: 1936 by Yaichi Hotta
- Easiest route: Lawan Valley

Nanda Kot ( Kumaoni-नन्दा कोट) is a mountain peak of the Himalaya range located in the Pithoragarh district of Uttarakhand state in India. It lies in the Kumaon Himalaya, just outside the ring of peaks enclosing the Nanda Devi Sanctuary, 15 kilometres (9 mi) southeast of Nanda Devi itself. The name Nanda Kot literally means "Nanda's Fortress" and refers to the abode of one of the sacred forms of the Hindu Goddess Parvati who in legend has made her sanctuary amongst the ring of lofty mountains in the region.

== Description ==
Nanda Kot is connected to the Sanctuary wall by a high pass known as the Pindari Kanda, 5,269 m (17,287 ft). This pass, Nanda Kot itself, and the ridge proceeding south from the peak together form the divide between the Pindar and Ghori Ganga River valleys, with Dana Dhura Pass connecting the two sides. The Kaphni (or Kafani), Pindar, Lawan, and Shalang Glaciers drain the south, west, north, and east sides of the peak respectively.

The first attempt to climb Nanda Kot was made in 1905 by T.G. Longstaff, who proceeded by way of the Lawan Valley, and Lawan Glacier. The first successful ascent of the summit came in 1936 by a Japanese team led by Yaichi Hotta. A new route involving a direct ascent of the south face was successfully undertaken by a British expedition led by Martin Moran in 1995. Mountaineering expeditions to Nanda Kot today typically follow the route through Loharkhet, Dhakuri Pass, Khati Village to Dwali base camp.

Outlying subpeaks of Nanda Kot include:

- Changuch, 6,322 m (20,741 ft)
- Kuchela Dhura, 6,294 m (20,650 ft)
- Nandabhaner (or Nandabhanar), 6,236 m (20,459 ft)
- Dangthal, 6,050 m (19,849 ft)
- Lespa Dhura (or Laspa Dhura), 5,913 m (19,400 ft)
- Lamchir, 5,662 m (18,576 ft)

== Nanda Devi/Nanda Kot nuclear controversy ==
In 1965, a covert mission was launched by an Indo-American team to install a nuclear-powered surveillance device on the top of Nanda Devi mountain to monitor Chinese activity in Tibet. The device was lost in a storm; in 1967, a similar device was placed just below the summit of Nanda Kot.

== See also ==
- Survey of India
- List of ultras of the Himalayas
