= Nanda Devi Raj Jat =

Ancient three-week pilgrimage and festival in Chamoli,Uttarakhand, India

Nanda Devi Badi jat/Raj jat
- A large number of devotees in Wan village during Nanda BadiJat/RajJat 2026
- Also called: Himalayan Mahakumbh
- Observed by: Hindus, particularly the people of Garhwal and Kumaon
- Type: Cultural, religious, royal
- Celebrations: From 5 September, 2026 to 23 September, 2026. A 280 km trek through 20+ stops involving sacred yagna and doli processions.
- Date: Varies per Hindu lunisolar calendar (Held once every 12 years)
- Related to: Parvati

The Nanda Devi Badi Jat or Raj Jat (नंदादेवी बड़ी जात या नंदादेवी राज जात) is a three-week-long pilgrimage and cultural festival of Uttarakhand, India. Often described as the "Himalayan Mahakumbh," it is organized once every 12 years in the Chamoli district. The journey signifies the symbolic departure of Nanda Devi (a mountain considered to be a goddess) from her maternal home (Mait) to her husband's home (Sauraas) in Mount Kailash.This pilgrimage begins simultaneously from two different points—Kurud (Nandanagar) and Kansuwa (Chandpur)—and the two routes converge at Nandakeshari & Wan and the pilgrimage continues further towards Homkund via Bedni Bugyal-Junargali-Roopkund. The terminology is not entirely uniform. In 2026, the Nanda Devi Siddhapeeth Kurud temple committee used the name Nanda ki Badi Jat for its proposed pilgrimage, while the Nanda Raj Jat Committee at Nauti continued to use the name Nanda Devi Raj Jat.

== Spiritual and theological origins ==
Theologically, Nanda Devi is identified with the supreme goddess mentioned in the Devi Mahatmya (also known as the Durga Saptashati). In the Murti Rahasya (The Secret of the Forms) section of the text, Nanda is described as the foundational energy of the universe.

== Shri Nanda Devi Sidhpeeth Kurur ==
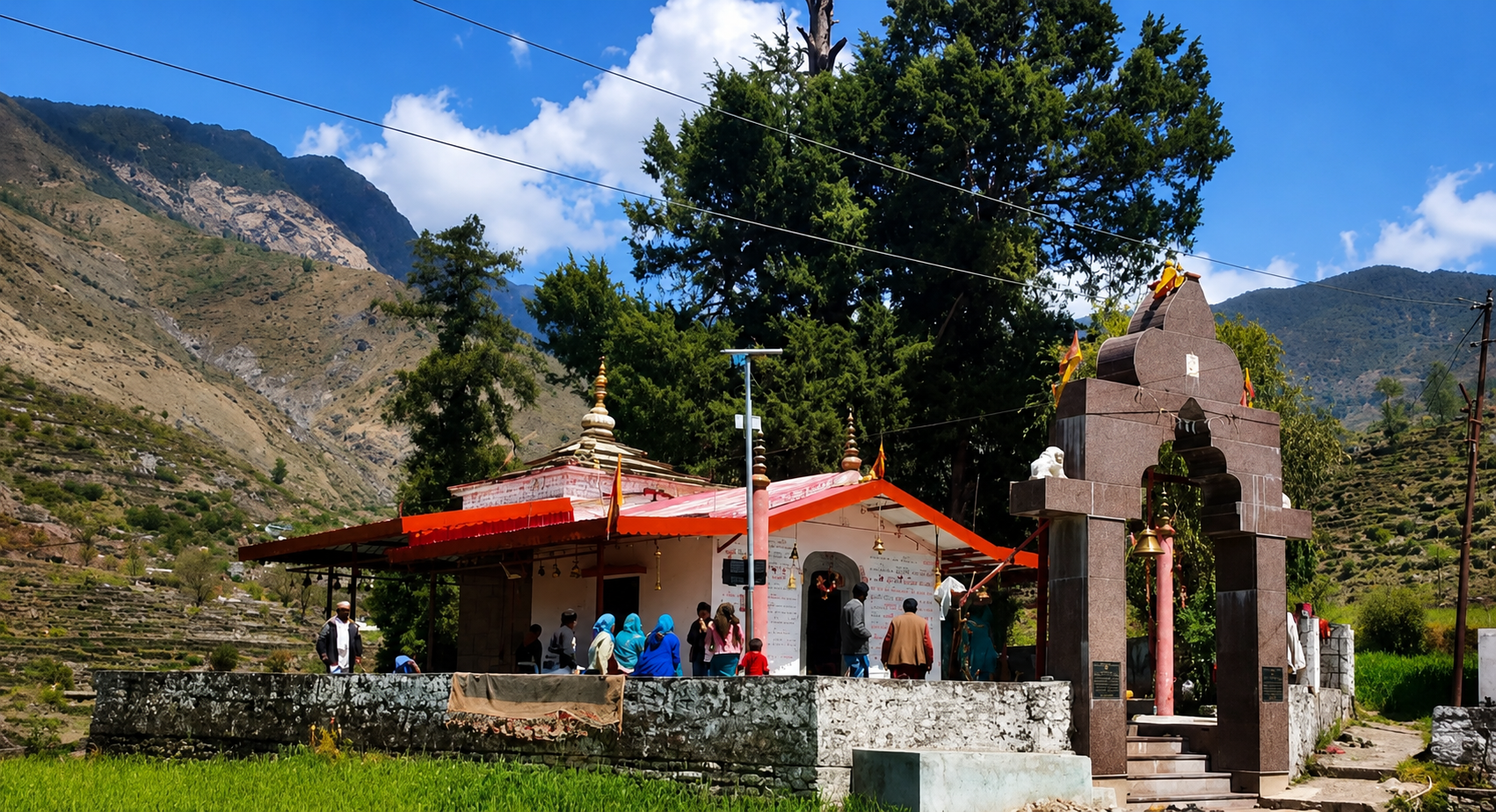
Maa Nanda Sidhpeeth Kurur, Nandanagar (Chamoli)

In 2026, representatives and devotees associated with Siddhpeeth Kurud formed a committee to organise a Nanda Devi Badi Jat. The organisers stated that the pilgrimage would formally begin from the Kurud temple and used the designation Nanda Ki Badi Jat or Ghenti Jat, distinguishing it from the Nauti-based Nanda Devi Raj Jat tradition.

The distinction became a subject of discussion in 2026, when the Kurud committee and other regional committees differed over the organisation and timing of Nanda Devi pilgrimages.

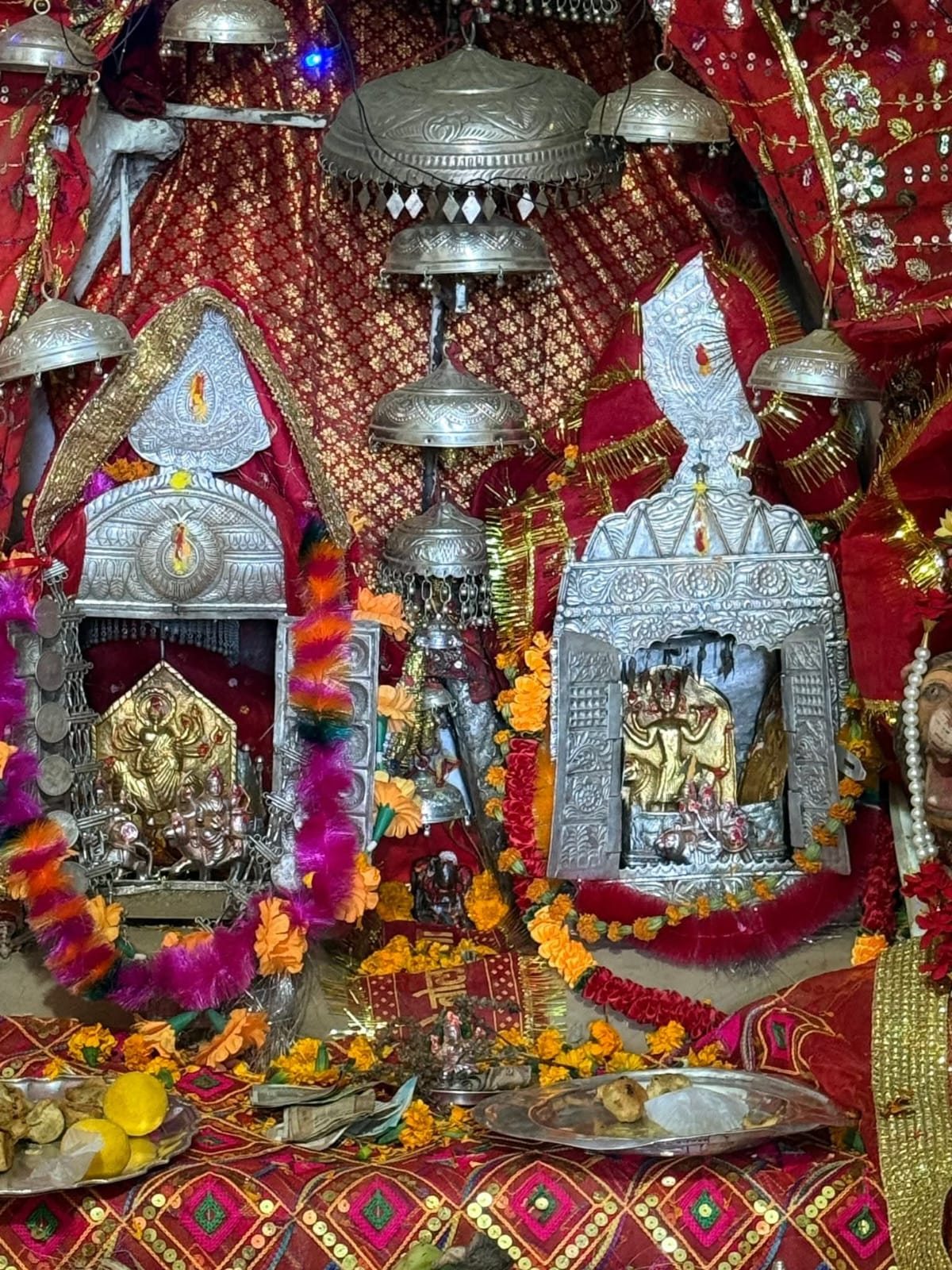
Maa Nanda Badhaan & Dasholi at Sidhpeeth Kurur alongwith swayambhu shilamurti at centre.

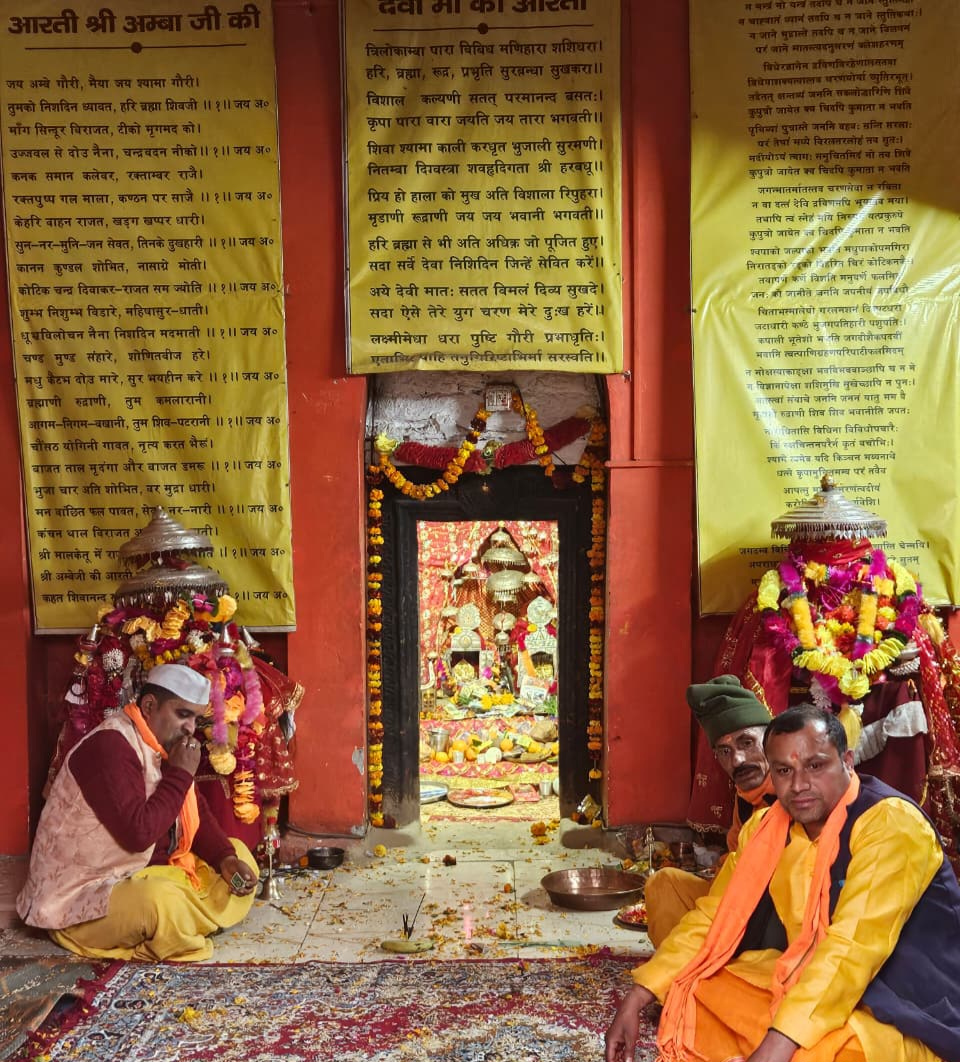
Doli's of Maa Nanda Devi (Dasholi & Badhaan) at Sidhpeeth Kurur

== Latu Devta Wan, Dewal ==
Located in Wan Village of Chamoli district, Uttarakhand, is a mysterious and revered shrine—the Latu Devta Temple, where Nagraj is believed to reside with his sacred jewel, or mani. One of the most remarkable traditions of this temple is that its doors are opened only once a year. Even on that day, the priest performs the worship from a distance, with his eyes, mouth, and nose covered with a cloth.

According to local folklore, Latu Devta is traditionally regarded as the Dharma brother of Maa Nanda Devi. He is also believed to be one of the chief attendants (Ganas) of Lord Shiva. He is said to have served as a commander, with two companions named Chho Singh and Bamo Singh.

During the famous Nanda Raj Jat Yatra of Uttarakhand, Latu Devta has a highly significant role. The pilgrimage symbolizes the traditional journey of Maa Nanda to her marital home in the Himalayan region of Kailash, with Latu Devta serving as her guide along the way.

According to local belief, Nagraj himself resides inside the sanctum of the temple along with his sacred mani. It is believed that the intense radiance of the mani and the serpent’s venom could harm the eyes and body of an ordinary person. Therefore, the priest covers his eyes, mouth, and nose and performs the worship from a distance.

The Story of Latu Devta It is believed that when Maa Nanda expressed her wish that she had a brother, Lord Shiva introduced her to Latu, a prince of Kannauj. Maa Nanda accepted Latu as her Dharma brother and brought him to her maternal home at Risasau.

The Incident of the Alcohol and Latu’s Death When the doli (palanquin) of Nanda Devi reached Wan Village, Latu became thirsty. He went to an elderly woman’s house and asked for water. There were two pots there—one containing water and the other containing alcohol.

By mistake, Latu drank from the pot containing alcohol. He became unconscious and fell down. According to the legend, his tongue was injured in the fall, causing him to lose his ability to speak, and he eventually died. Maa Nanda, deeply saddened by his death, is believed to have instructed the local people to worship him as a local deity.

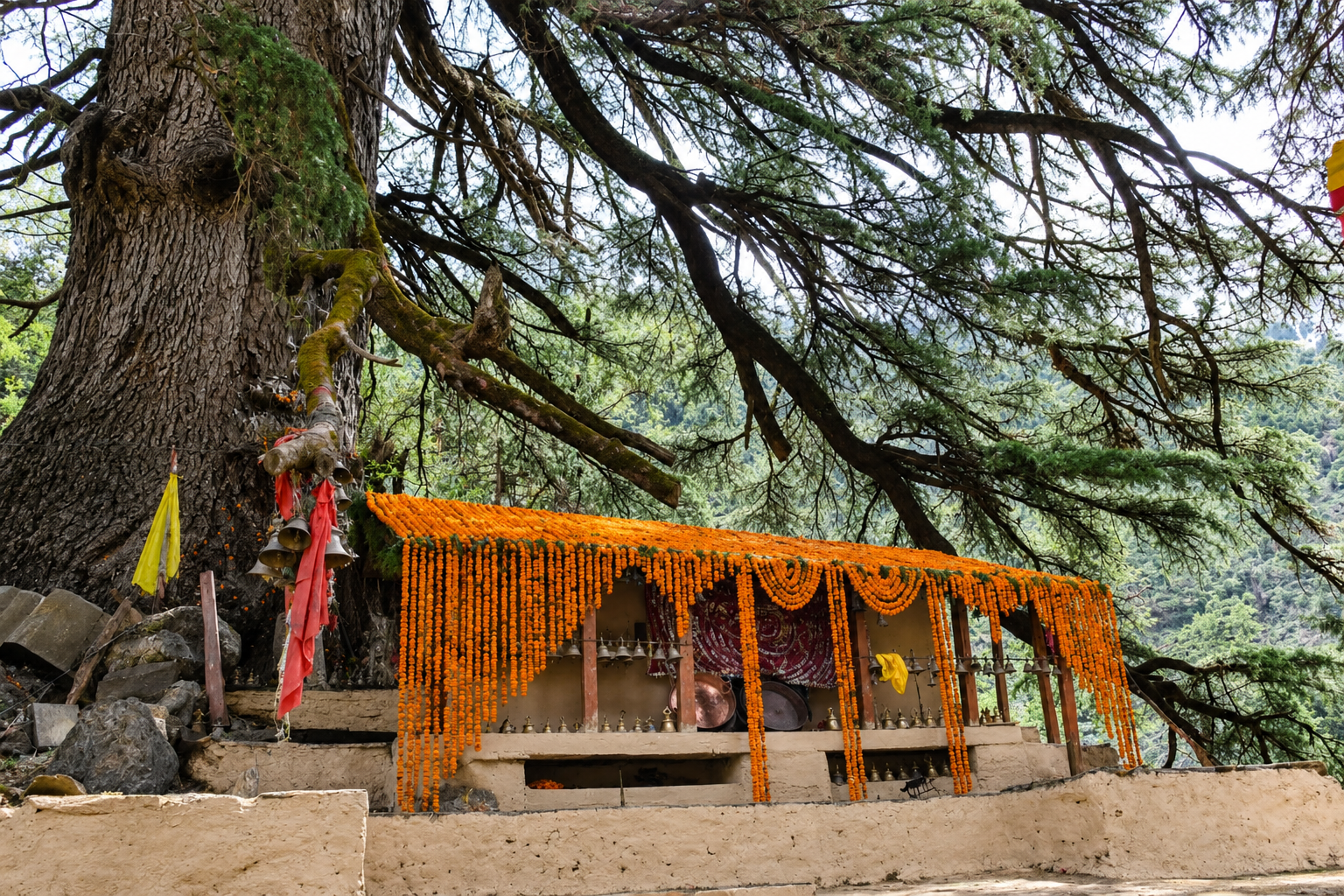
Latu Dham, Wan (Dewal), Chamoli

Origin of the Temple According to local tradition, at the place where Latu Devta died, members of the local Bisht community installed a linga. Some time later, a cow began coming to the site every day and offering its milk there.

One day, the linga was destroyed. However, according to the legend, someone received a dream instructing them to reinstall the sacred linga. Following this divine message, the linga was re-established in Wan Village, and the temple of Latu Devta was subsequently built.

Latu Devta is associated with deeply Nanda Devi tradition and the Nanda Raj Jat Yatra. In local belief, he is regarded as the Dharma brother of Nanda Devi.

== Jaman Singh Jadora, Ida Badhani ==
It is believed that, in fulfilment of the promise made between the Goddess Nanda and her devotee, Maa Nanda visits Ida-Badhani as the first halt of the Nanda Badijaat/ Rajjat Yatra before departing for Kailash. During the historic and religiously significant Raj Jat pilgrimage, which passes through 19 traditional halts, the Chhantoli (sacred palanquin) of Maa Nanda leaves Nauti and reaches the village of Ida-Badhani on the first day. There, the goddess spends the night at the homes of the Jadora Gusain descendants. The descendants of the Jadora family offer jewellery, kaleu (traditional food offerings), and items used for the goddess's adornment. On the second day, the goddess's Chhantoli visits the nearby villages and eventually returns to Nauti. On the third day, amid great devotion and emotional farewell, Maa Nanda departs for Kailash.

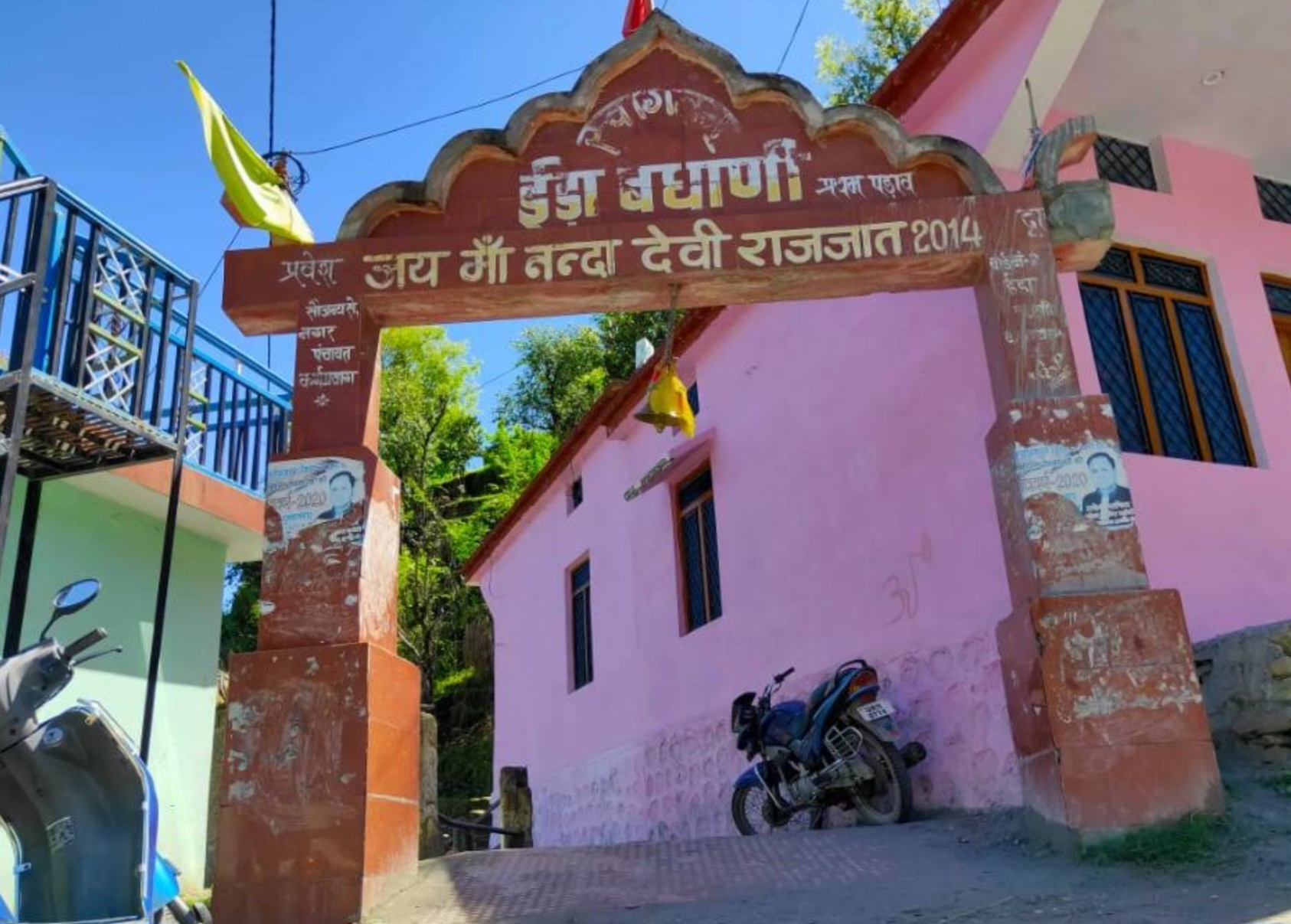
Ida Badhani Village

Ancient Tradition According to local tradition, in ancient times Lord Ashutosh (Lord Shiva) and Goddess Parvati were travelling towards Kailash from this region. During their journey, Goddess Parvati became thirsty and went towards the nearby village of Badhani, while Lord Shiva continued directly towards Shaileshwar. At that time, Jaman Singh Jadora (Gusain), who was the Thokdar and village head of Badhani, welcomed the goddess with great respect. He offered her water and served her dahi-bhaat (curd and rice). Before departing, Jaman Singh Jadora requested Goddess Parvati to visit his home whenever she travelled towards Kailash. It is believed that Maa Shri Nanda continues to honour this ancient promise during the Nanda Raj Jat Yatra by spending a night at the homes of the descendants of the Jadora Gusain family in Ida-Badhani before departing for Kailash.

=== Archaeological expedition ===
Modern academic and historical interest in the traditional route was significantly revitalised by a 1985 youth study expedition. A five-member group completed the full 280 km trek to document oral traditions and archaeological markers.

- Ancient Archaeological Markers: On 25 October 1985, near Bekaltal, the group identified ancient iron arrows (Baan) embedded deep within trees. These artifacts serve as physical evidence of the route's antiquity, marking paths used by past rulers and pilgrims.
- Cultural Preservation in Wan: The study documented that the village of Wan—the final inhabited settlement before the high-altitude wilderness—remains a stronghold of tradition. Local women continue to preserve and wear specific traditional jewellery and attire (Alankar) that is exclusive to the 12-year Raj Jat cycle.
- Public Recognition: Upon their return, the expedition members were publicly honoured at a large block rally in Karnaprayag on 26 October 1985, where they shared their findings on the Himalayan Mahakumbh with the public.

== Nanda Badi Jat/ Raj Jat 2026 ==
A large number of devotees welcoming Maa Nanda in Wan village.

Nanda Badi Jat or Raj Jat 2026 at Bedni Bugyal

Chausinghya Khadu.

Chhatoli woven from ringal.

On the way to Homkund, Shilasamudra region.

Temple of Maa Nanda at Homkund.
