= Pindar River =

River in Uttarakhand state of India

Pindar
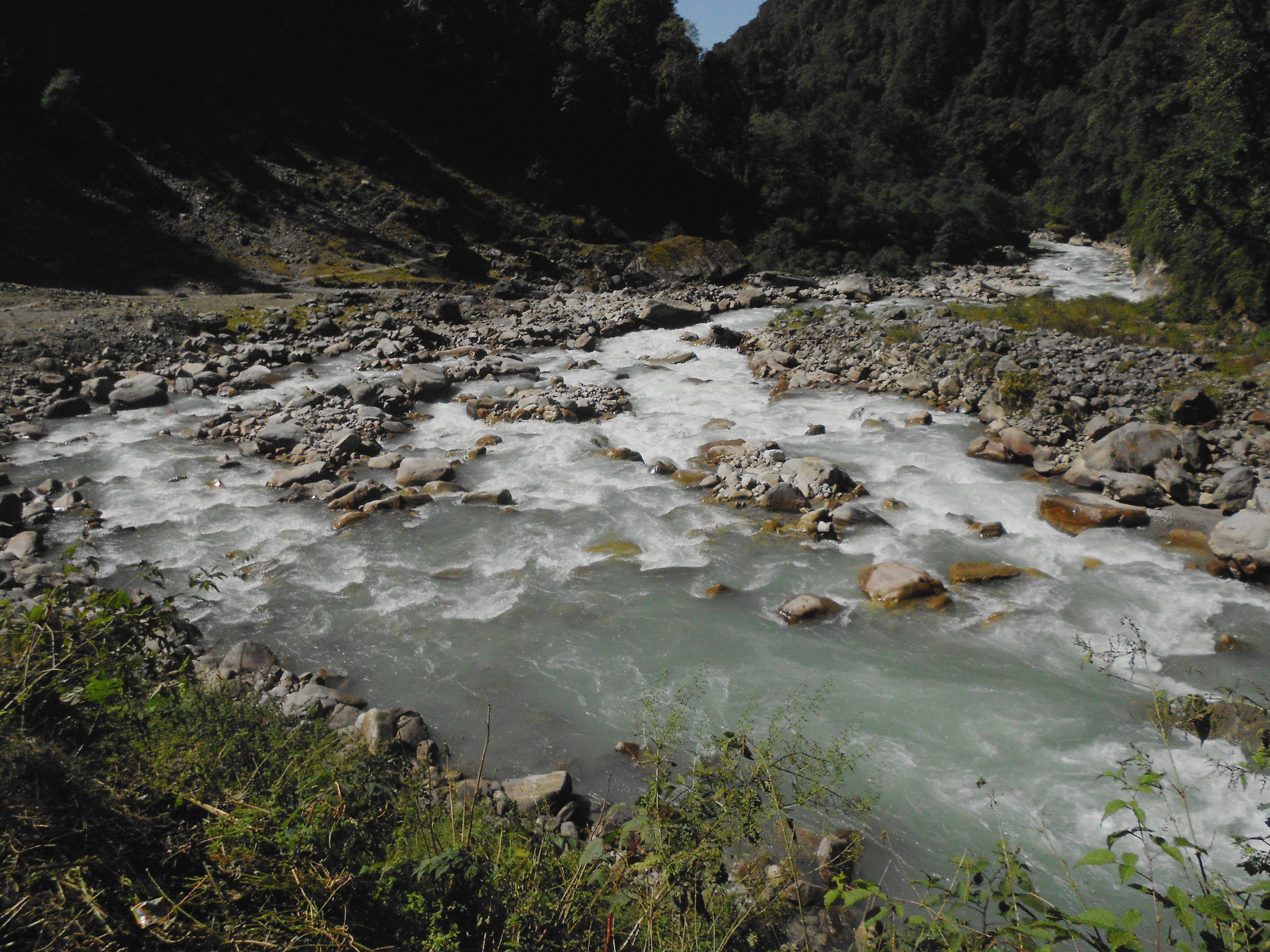
- Pindar river during month of September 2011

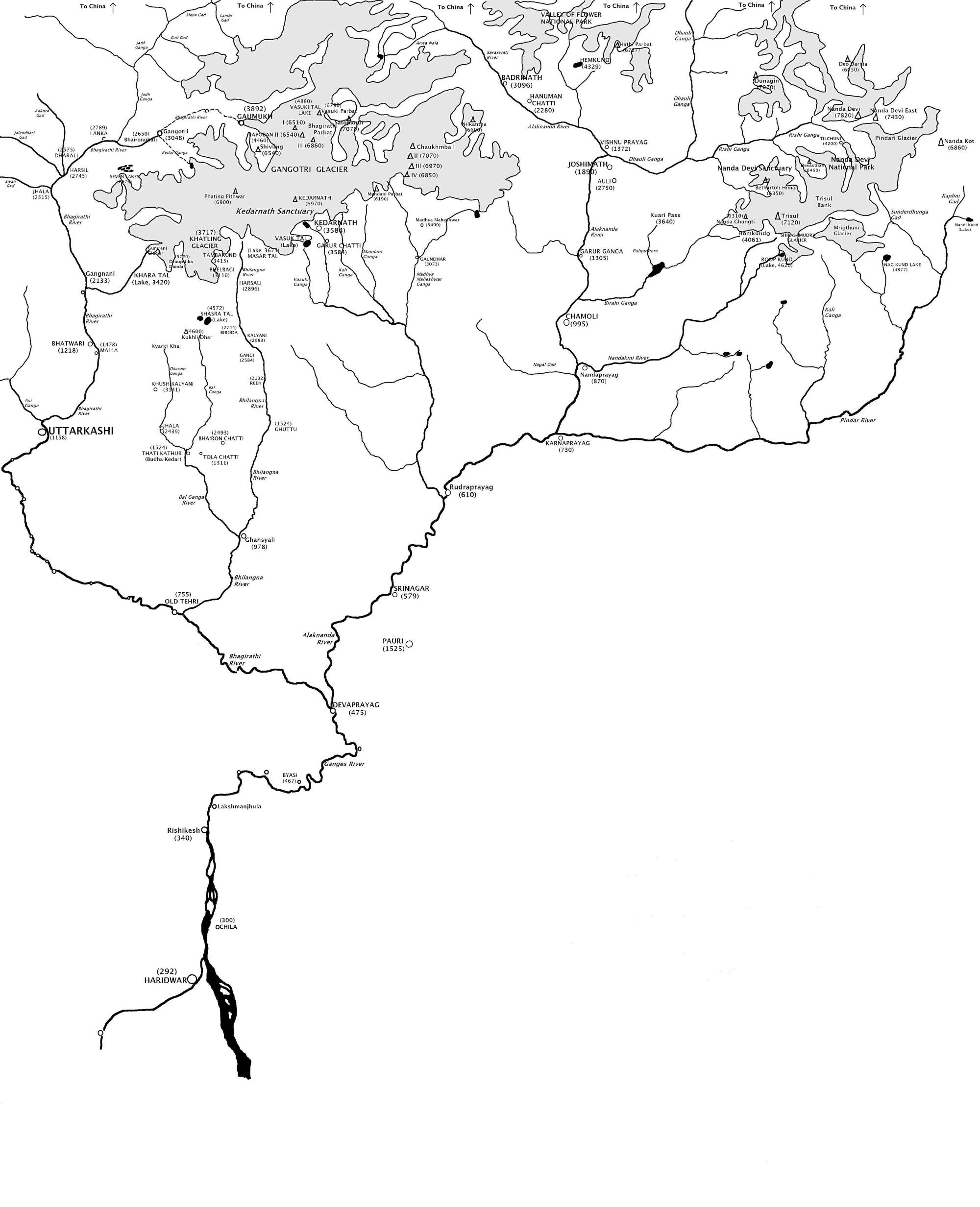
- Pinder River in far right

Location
- Country: India
- State: Uttarakhand
- Region: Kumaon division
- District: Bageshwar, Chamoli

Physical characteristics
- Source: Pindari Glacier
  - coordinates: 30°17′N 80°01′E
  - elevation: 3,820 m (12,530 ft)
- Mouth: Alaknanda
  - location: Karnaprayag, Uttarakhand
  - coordinates: 30°15′49″N 79°13′00″E
  - elevation: 1,450 m (4,760 ft)
- Length: 105 km (65 mi)

Basin features
- Tributaries
  - right: Kali Ganga

The Pindar River is a river located in Uttarakhand, India. The Pindar originates from Pindari Glacier which is located in Bageshwar district of Kumaon region in Uttarakhand. The source of this river, the Pindar glacier is located at an altitude of 3,820 m (12,530 ft). Pindar glacier has relatively easier access and has been documented well for its retreat over 100 years. Pindar river mouth is located at Karnaprayag where it flows into Alaknanda River.

== Gallery ==
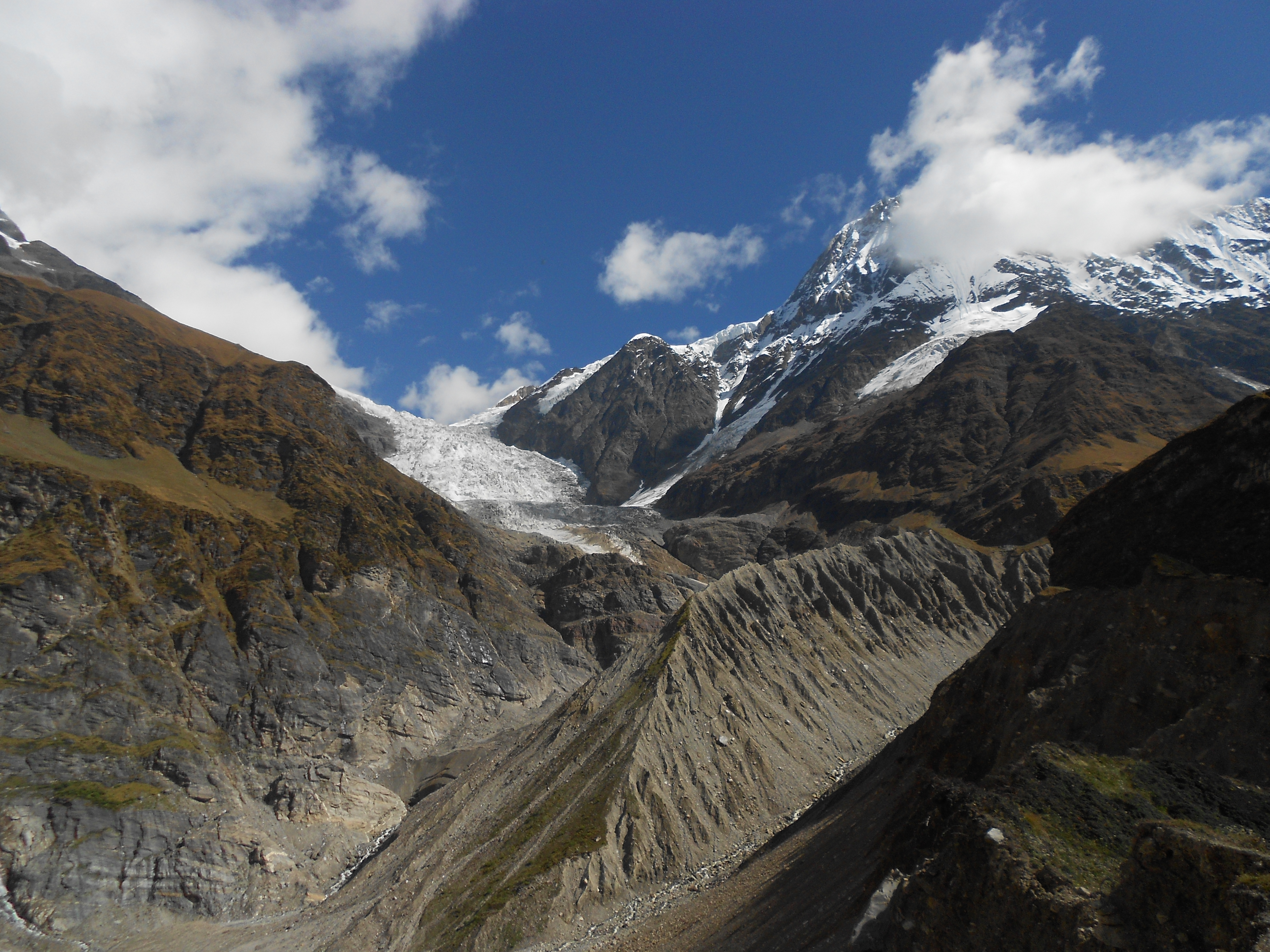
Origin from Pindari Glacier

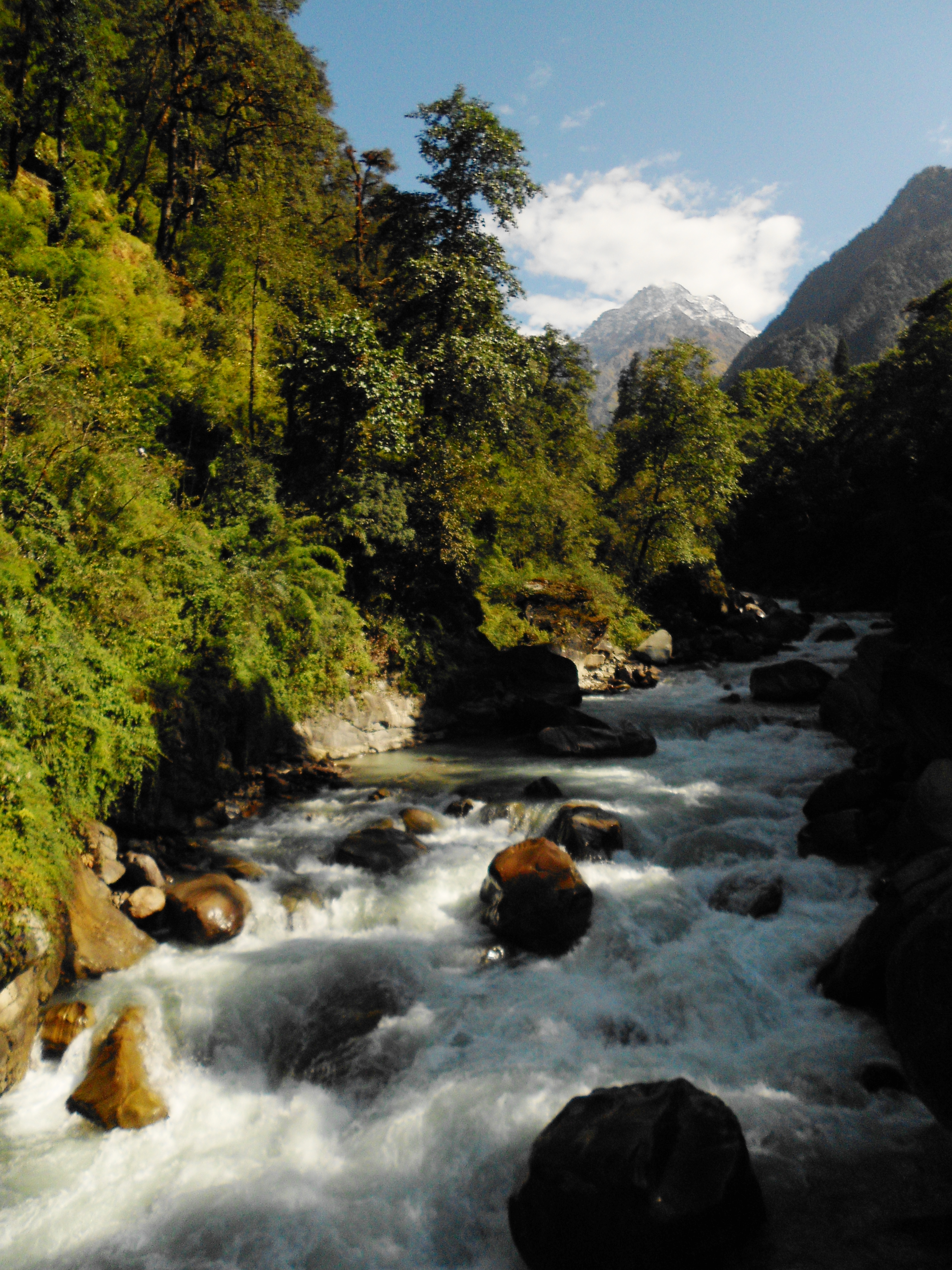
Pindari river from Dwali

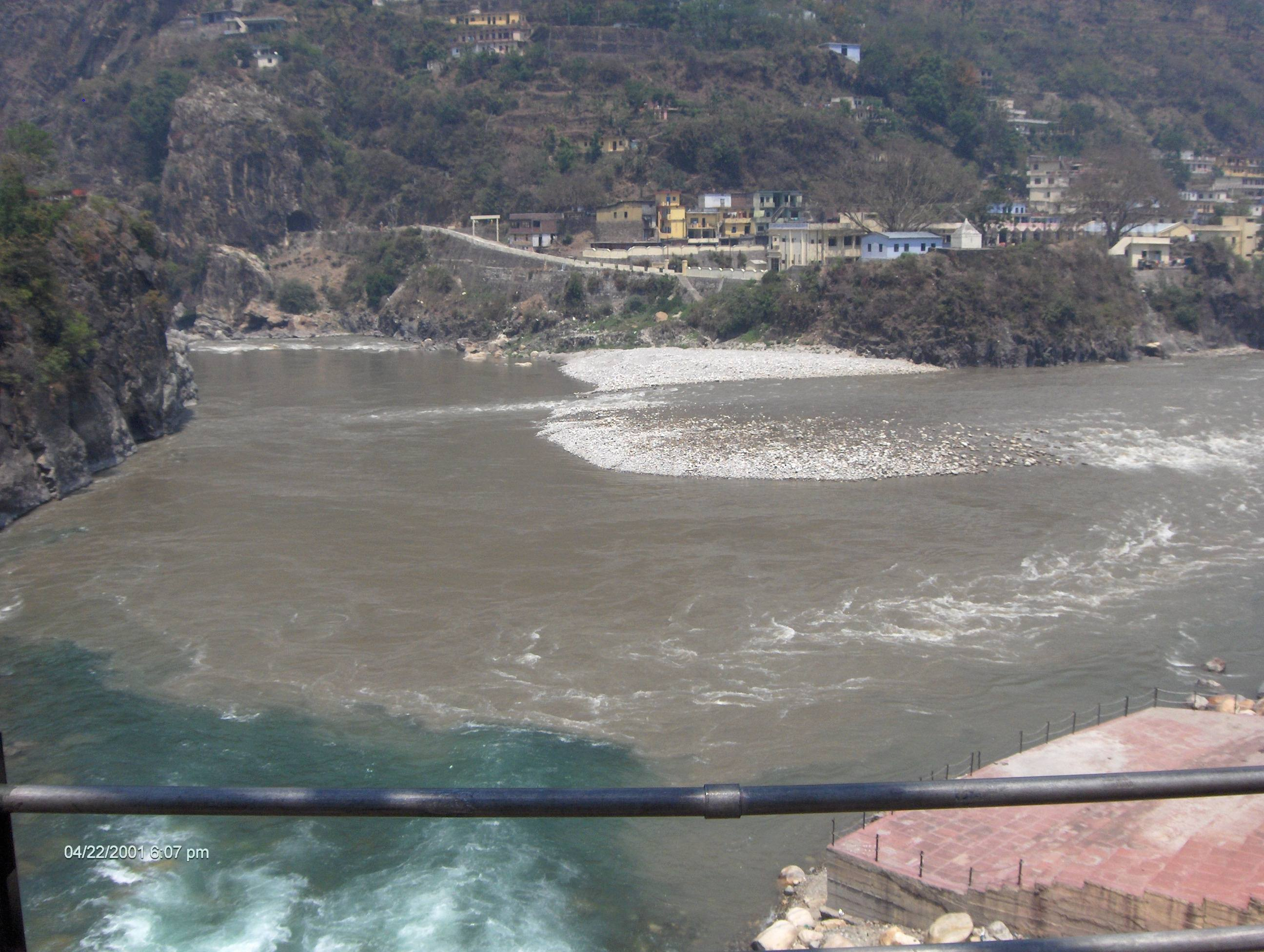
Confluence of Alaknanda and Pindar from bottom

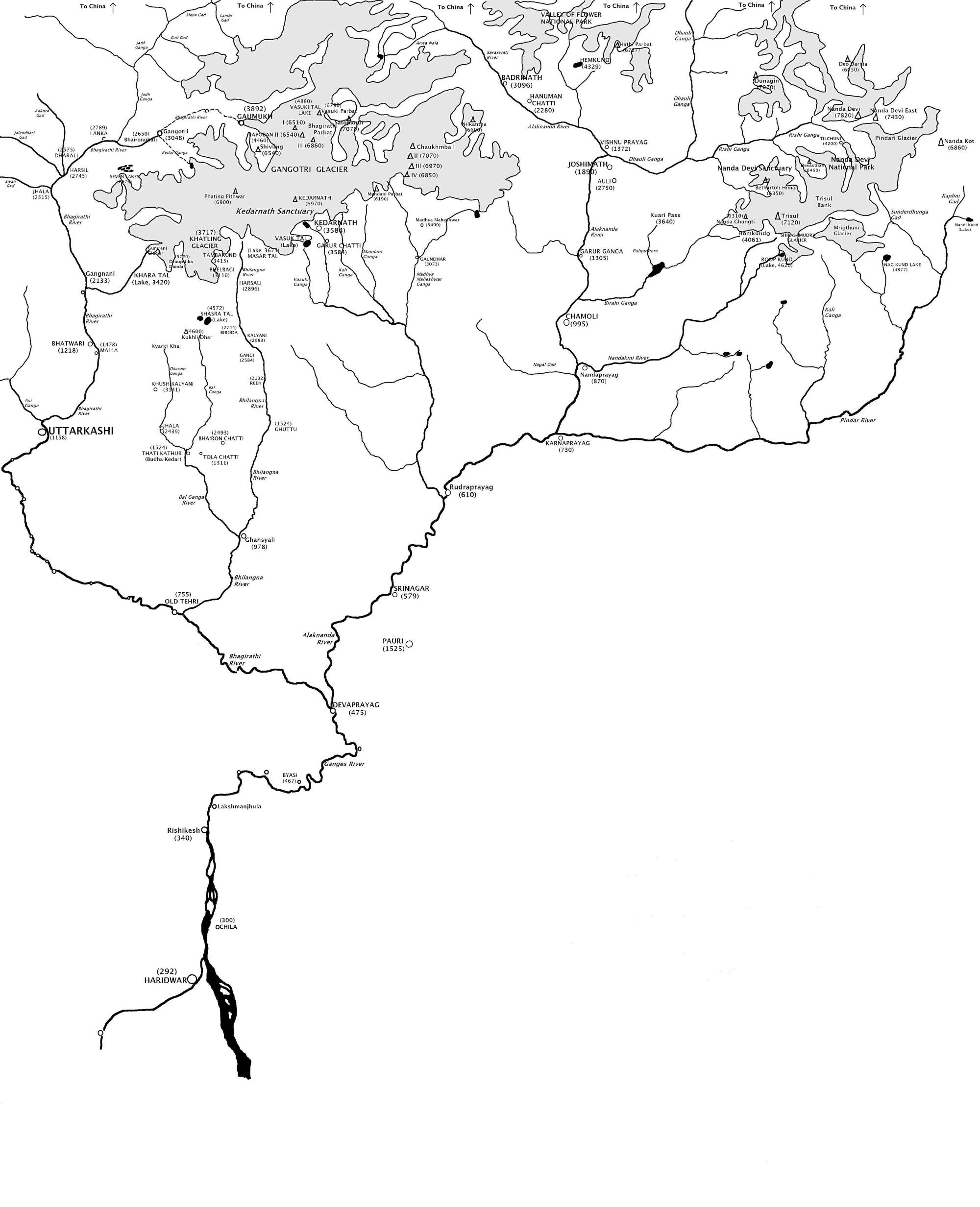
Pinder River (far right) in the map showing The Himalayan headwaters of the Ganges river in Uttarakhand
