= Someshwar, Uttarakhand =

Town, tehsil and sub-division in Uttarakhand, India

Someshwar
- Sub-division
- Nickname: Someshwar Ghati
- Location in Uttarakhand, India Someshwar (India)
- Country: India
- State: Uttarakhand
- District: Almora
- Elevation: 1,414 m (4,639 ft)

Population (2011)
  - Total: 40,282

Languages
  - Official: Hindi
  - Native: Kumaoni
- Time zone: UTC+5:30 (IST)
- PIN: 263637
- Vehicle registration: UK 01
- Website: uk.gov.in

Someshwar is the name of the sub-division headquarters, a conglomeration of revenue villages and it also refers to the entire region as Someshwar Tehsil and Sub Division in the Almora District in the hill-state of Uttarakhand, India.

Someshwar is situated in the banks of two rivers viz. Kosi and Sai almost 7 km away from well known tourist place Kausani. The valley of Someshwar is surrounded by peaks known as Jayanti and Airi. Their names are respectively based on two Hindu Goddesses. Someshwar itself is a holy place dedicated to lord Shiva. The topography and availability of natural infrastructure provide an excellent opportunity for development of tourism/ecotourism.The Someshwar valley is divided into two sub-vallies - Lod Valley and Boraro Valley. Both the valleys are also called as Bowl of Rice.

== Geography ==
Someshwar is one of the well connected places of Uttarakhand that is situated in foots of Himalaya. It is developed in the banks of Kosi and Sai rivers. one more river known as Mansa is in the close proximity. Basins of these rivers provide fertile land for agriculture at such a hilly terrain.

== Demographics ==
Someshwar Tehsil of Almora district has total population of 40,282 as per the Census 2011. Out of which 18,214 are males while 22,068 are females. In 2011 there were total 9,697 families residing in Someshwar Tehsil. The Average Sex Ratio of Someshwar Tehsil is 1,212.

The population of Children of age 0–6 years in Someshwar Tehsil is 5324 which is 13% of the total population. There are 2762 male children and 2562 female children between the age 0–6 years. Thus as per the Census 2011 the Child Sex Ratio of Someshwar Tehsil is 928 which is less than Average Sex Ratio ( 1,212 ) of Someshwar Tehsil.

The total literacy rate of Someshwar Tehsil is 78.86%. The male literacy rate is 78.95% and the female literacy rate is 59.77%.

== Transport ==
Someshwar is situated at the junction of Almora-Kausani-karnaprayag Highway and Bageshwar-Dwarahat road. Buses and Jeeps, cars are available to the nearby cities of Kausani, Garur and Almora.

=== Institutions ===
HUKUM SINGH BORA POST GRADUATE COLLEGE SOMESHWAR.
