= Kausani =

- Hill Station
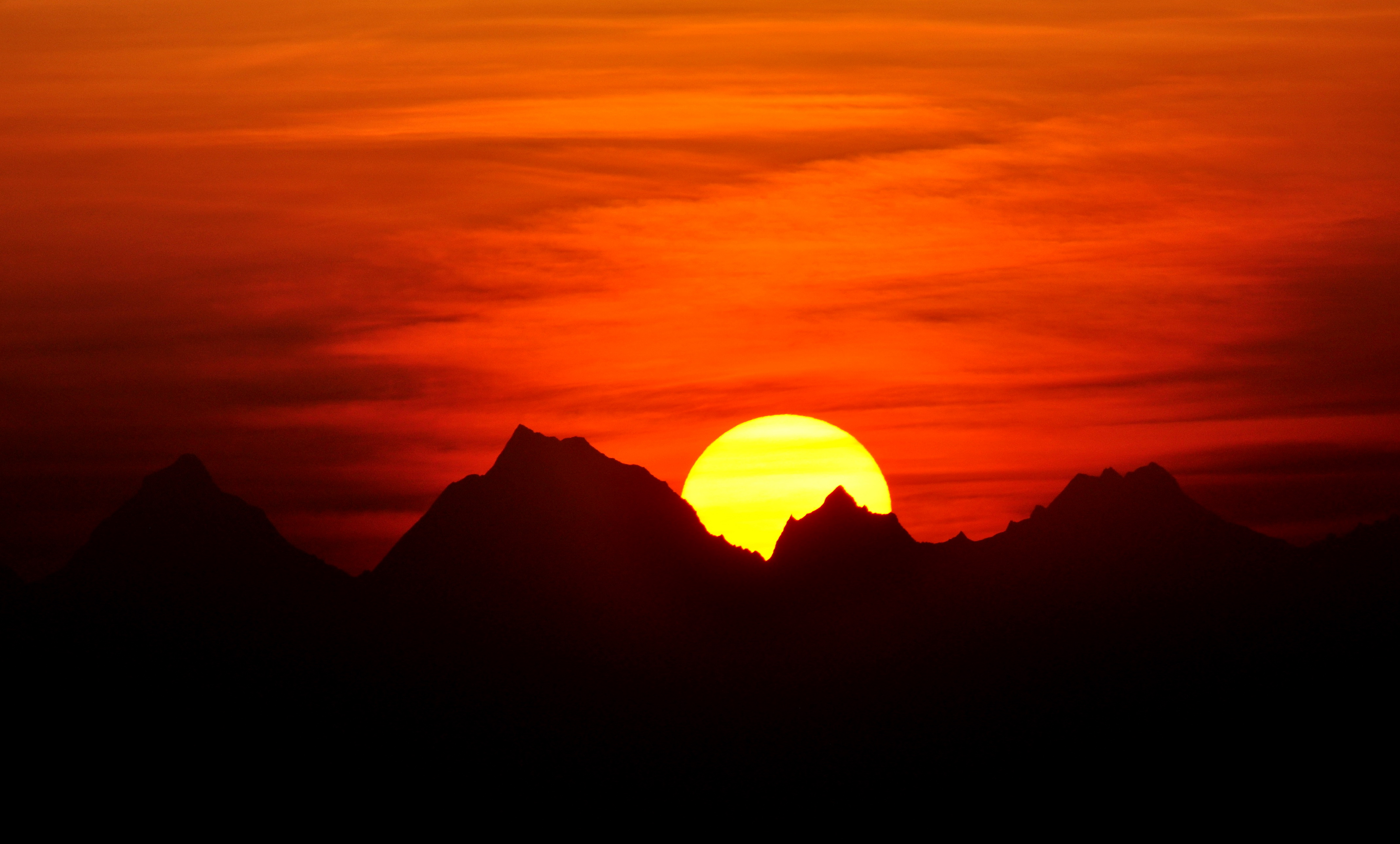
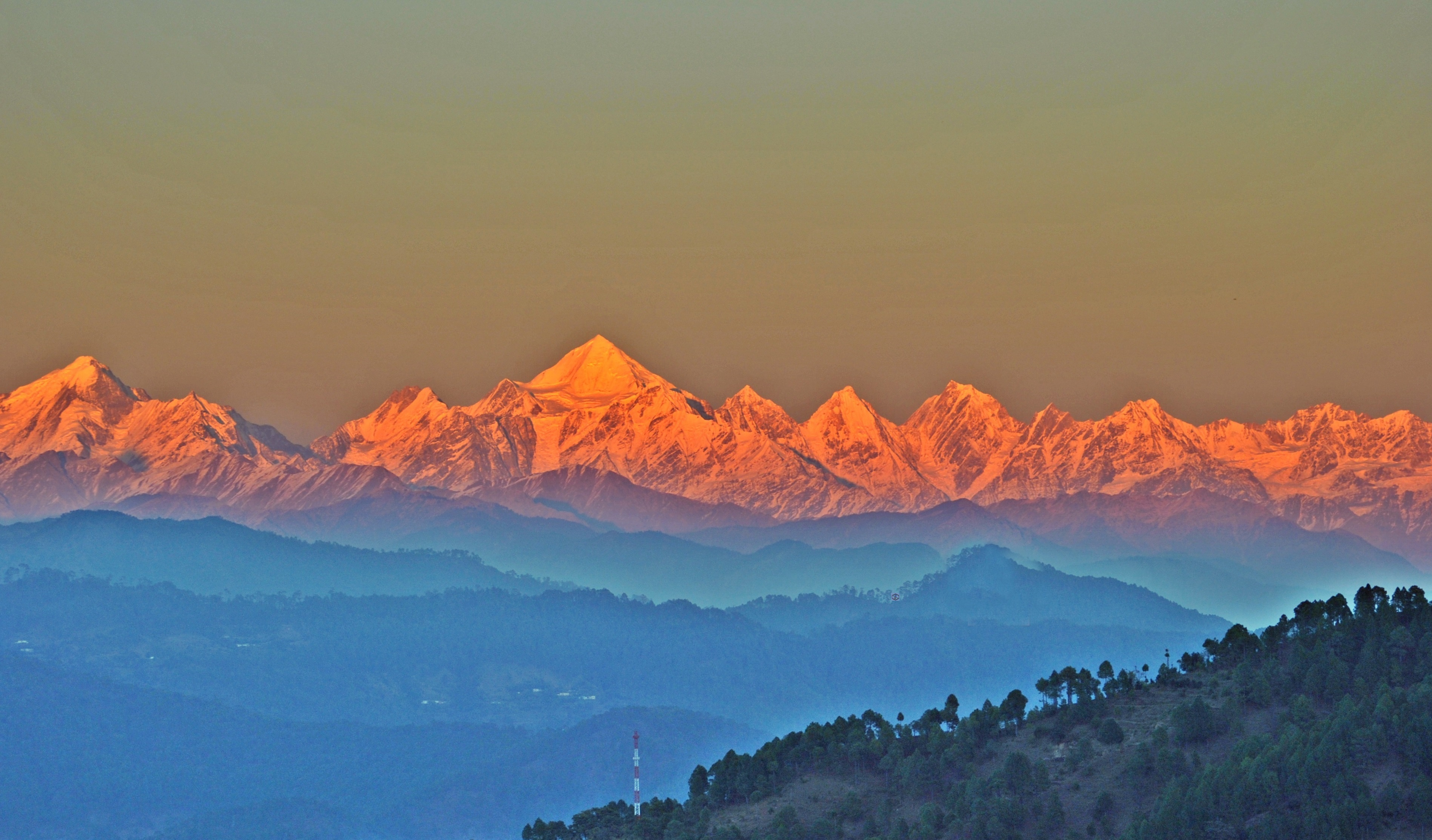
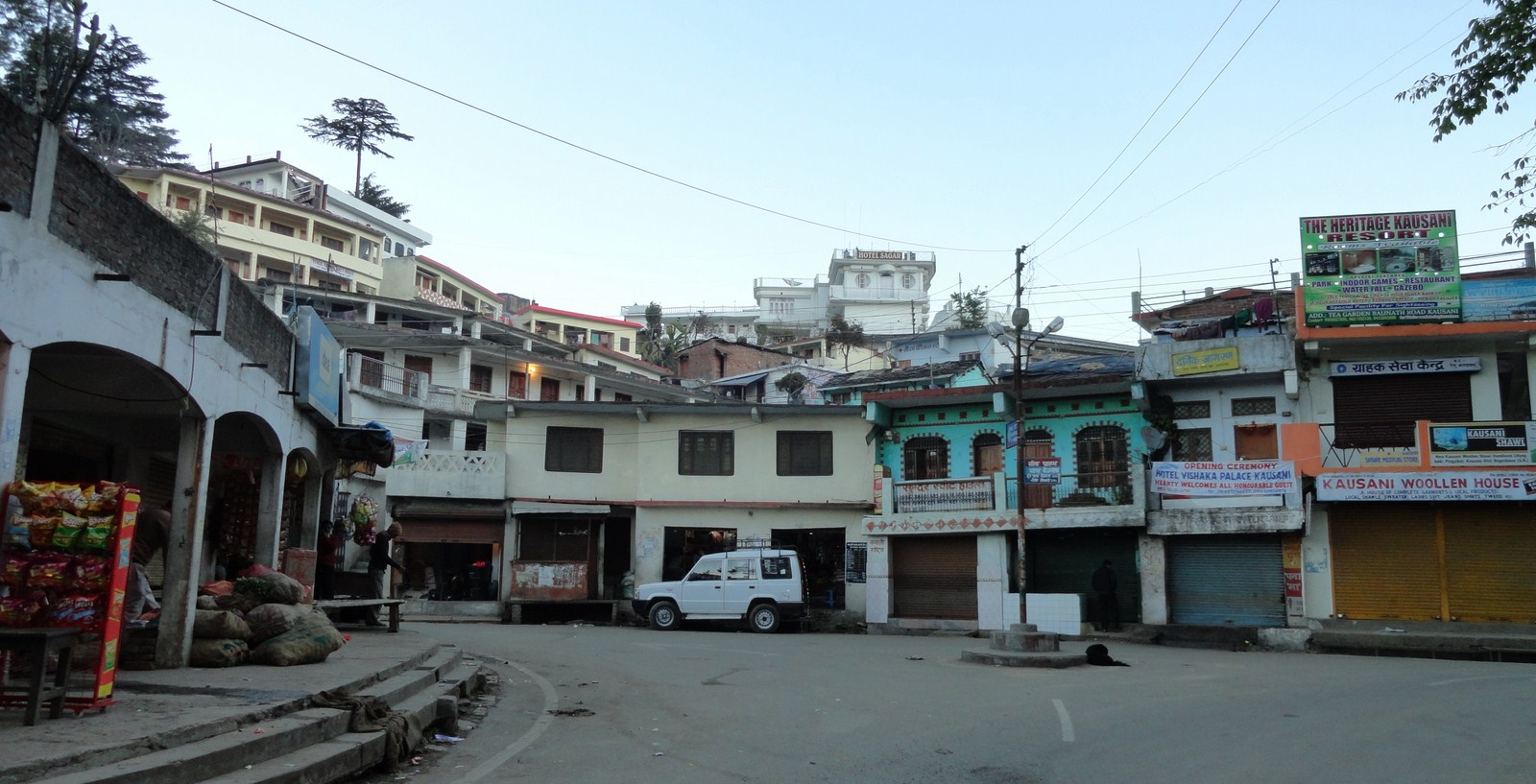
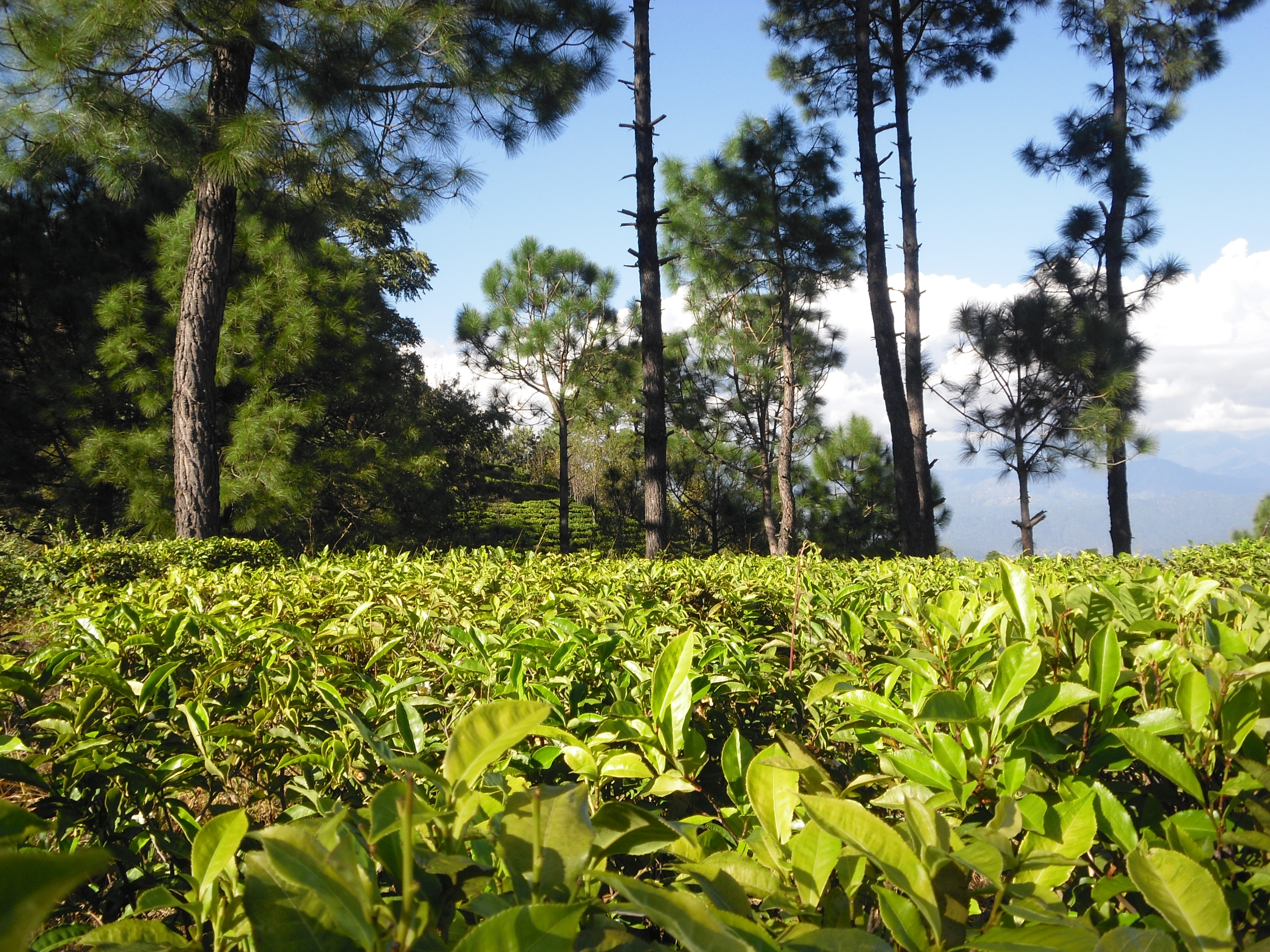
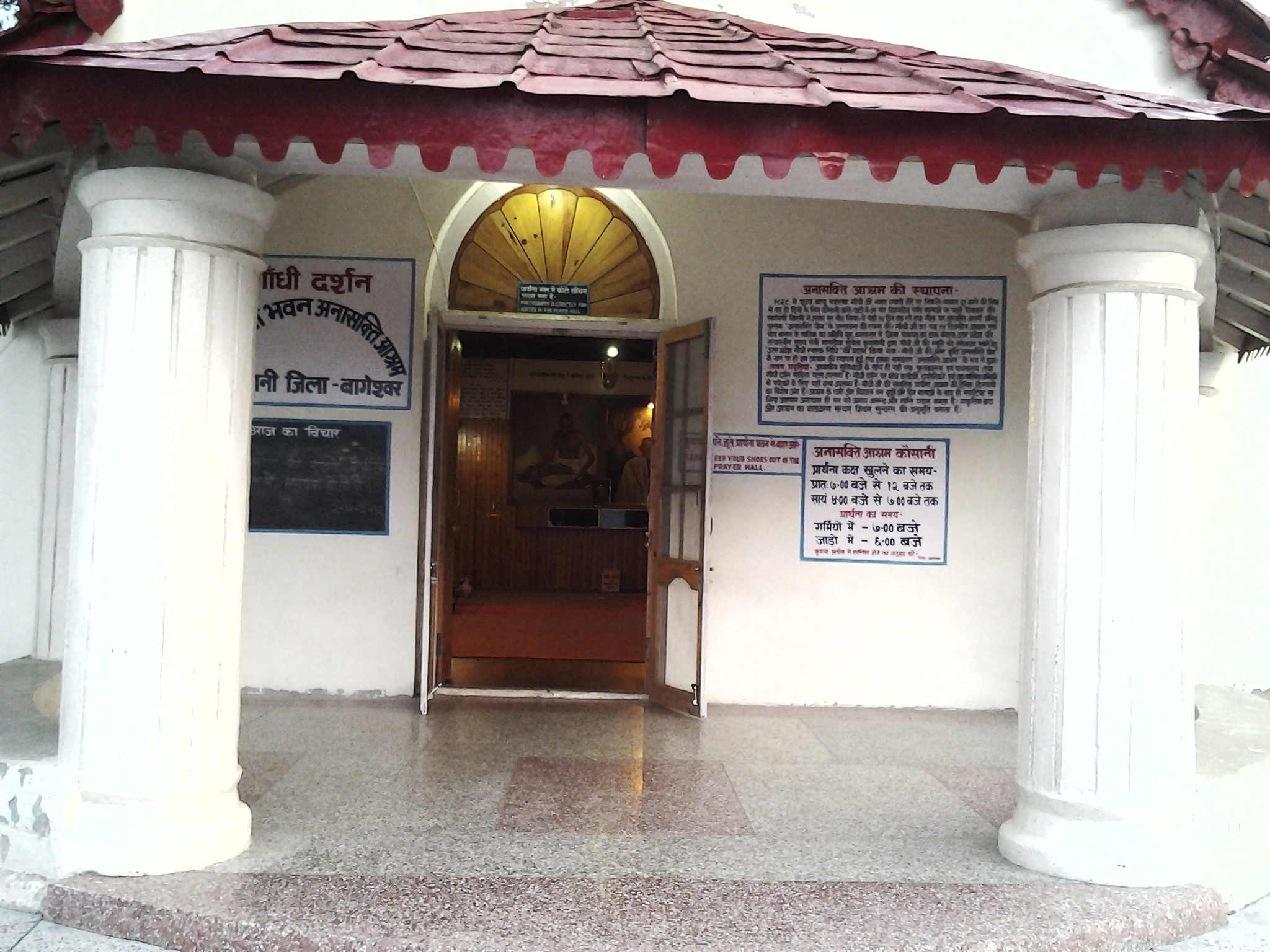
- Clockwise from top: Sunrise at Kausani, View of Trisul and Panchchuli peaks, Almora-Karnaprayag Road, Anasakti Ashram and Tea Plantations.

- Location in Uttarakhand, India Kausani (India)
- Coordinates: 29.84°N 79.60°E
- Country: India
- State: Uttarakhand
- District: Bageshwar

Area
  - Total: 5.2 km^{2} (2.0 sq mi)
- Elevation: 1,890 m (6,200 ft)

Population (2011)
  - Total: 2,408
  - Density: 460/km^{2} (1,200/sq mi)

Languages
  - Official: Hindi; Dhabela
  - Spoken: Kumaoni
- Time zone: UTC+5:30 (IST)
- PIN: 263639
- Telephone code: 05962
- Vehicle registration: UK-02
- Website: uk.gov.in

Kausani (Kumaoni: Kôsānī) is a hill station and Village situated in Bageshwar district in the state of Uttarakhand, India. It is known for its scenery and its 300 km-wide panoramic view of Himalayan peaks like Trisul, Nanda Devi and Panchchuli. Mahatma Gandhi called this place the 'Switzerland of India', due to similarity in landscapes.

== History ==
During Independence of India in 1947, Kausani was situated in the Almora District till 15 September 1997 after which Bageshwar district was carved out of Almora district. On 9 November 2000, the State of Uttarakhand was created from the Himalayan and adjoining northwestern districts of Uttar Pradesh.

== Geography ==
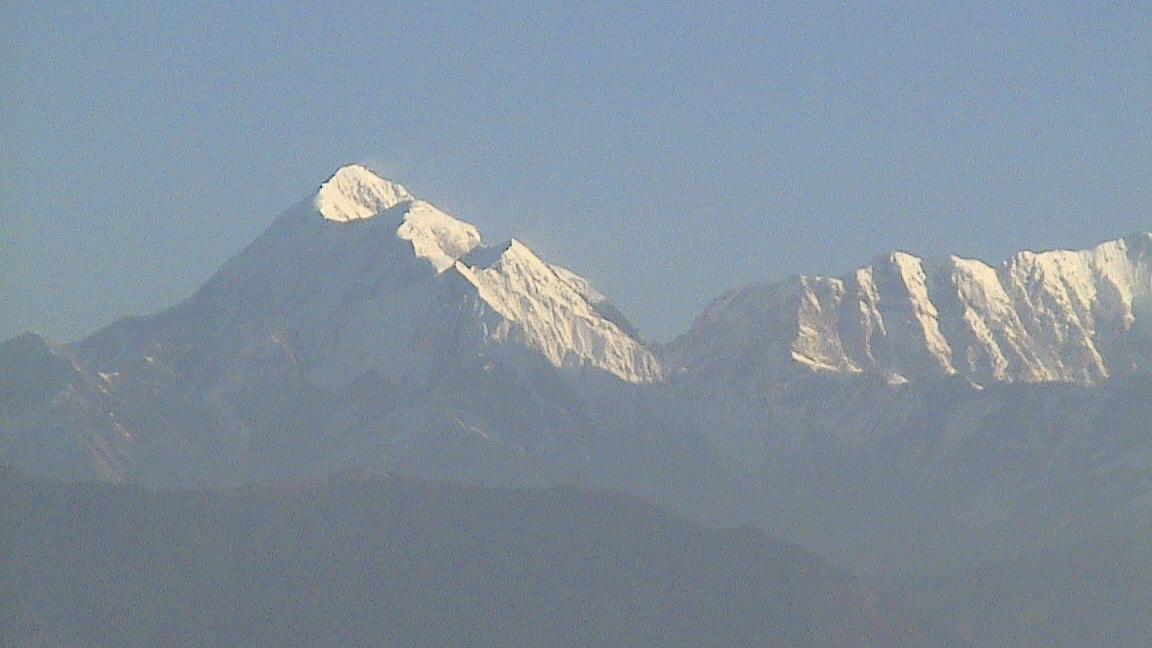
Trisul mountain as viewed from Kausani

Kausani is located at 29.8541°N 79.5966°E in Bageshwar district of Uttarakhand, India at a distance of 40 km (25 mi) from Bageshwar city, the administrative headquarters of Bageshwar District. Kausani is located 52 km (32 mi) north of Almora, a major hill station and the historical capital of Kumaon Kingdom. Kausani lies in the Kumaon division and is situated 123 km (76 mi) north-east of Nainital, the headquarters of Kumaon. Nearby towns include Garur (14 km (8.7 mi)) and Someshwar (12 km (7.5 mi)). It has an average elevation of 1,890 m (6,200 ft) above mean sea level. Kausani lies atop a ridge amidst dense pine trees overlooking Someshwar valley on one side and Garur and Katyuri valley on the other on Almora-Bageshwar-Didihat Highway. Kausani is a part of the Lesser Himalayas, a region watered by rivers like Kosi, Gomti and Ramganga. Their banks, known as seras, are highly fertile.

== Climate ==
Temperature ranges between 10 °C and 26 °C in summers. Winters are quite cold with temperature ranging between 15 °C and 2 °C. Rainfall lies between Max 3048 mm and Min 1777 mm.

== Demographics ==
According to Census 2011 information the location code or village code of Kausani State village is 051443. Kausani State village is located in Garur Tehsil of Bageshwar district in Uttarakhand, India. It is situated 18 km (11 mi) away from sub-district headquarter Garur and 40 km (25 mi) away from district headquarter Bageshwar. As per 2009 stats, Kausani is the gram panchayat of Kausani State village.

Kausani State is a large village located in Garur of Bageshwar district, Uttarakhand with total 512 families residing. The total geographical area of the village is 429.92 hectares. Kausani State has a total population of 2,408 of which 1195 are males while 1213 are females as per Population Census 2011.

In Kausani State village population of children with age 0-6 is 334 which makes up 13.87% of total population of village. Average sex ratio of Kausani State village is 1015 which is higher than Uttarakhand state average of 963. Child Sex Ratio for the Kausani State as per census is 825, lower than Uttarakhand average of 890.

Kausani State village has higher literacy rate compared to Uttarakhand. In 2011, literacy rate of Kausani State village was 87.80% compared to 78.82% of Uttarakhand. In Kausani State Male literacy stands at 96.25% while female literacy rate was 79.76%.

In Kausani State village, most of the villagers are from Schedule Caste (SC). Schedule Caste (SC) constitutes 45.47% while Schedule Tribe (ST) were 0.33% of total population in Kausani State village.

In Kausani State village out of total population, 1086 were engaged in work activities. 54.24% of workers describe their work as Main Work (Employment or Earning more than 6 Months) while 45.76% were involved in Marginal activity providing livelihood for less than 6 months. Of 1086 workers engaged in Main Work, 187 were cultivators (owner or co-owner) while 16 were Agricultural labourer.

As per constitution of India and Panchyati Raaj Act, Kausani State village is administrated by Sarpanch (Head of Village) who is elected representative of village. Kumaoni is spoken by the majority; however, Hindi and Sanskrit are the official languages.

== Economy ==
Many of Kausani's men serve in the army – a phenomenon common in the northern hill towns of the country. The rest of the population depends on agriculture and allied activities, tourism and other small businesses for their livelihood. The local handloom factory produces shawls, woollen apparel and blankets. Besides handloom products, the factory sells other local artefacts and tea from Kausani's tea estate. Kausani Tea Estate was established in 2000-2001 and produces 70,000 kg Tea.

In Kausani State village out of total population, 1086 were engaged in work activities. 54.24% of workers describe their work as Main Work (Employment or Earning more than 6 Months) while 45.76% were involved in Marginal activity providing livelihood for less than 6 months. Of 1086 workers engaged in Main Work, 187 were cultivators (owner or co-owner) while 16 were Agricultural labourer.

== Tourism ==
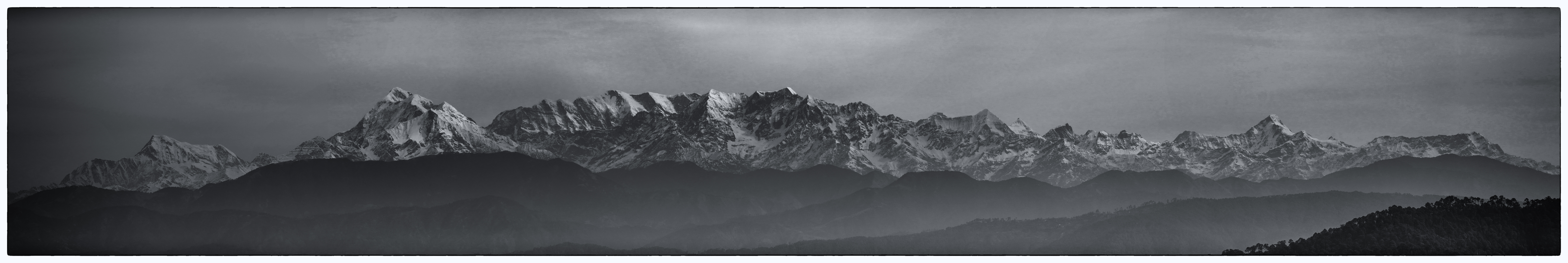
Panoramic view of the Himalayas from Kausani

=== Tourist attractions ===
Anashakti Ashram is a quiet place where Mahatma Gandhi spent some days and wrote his commentary of Anashakti Yog. The KMVN (Kumaon Mandal Vikas Nigam) resthouse in Kausani is an ideal place to stay and it provides panoramic views of the mountains.

Towards Kausani

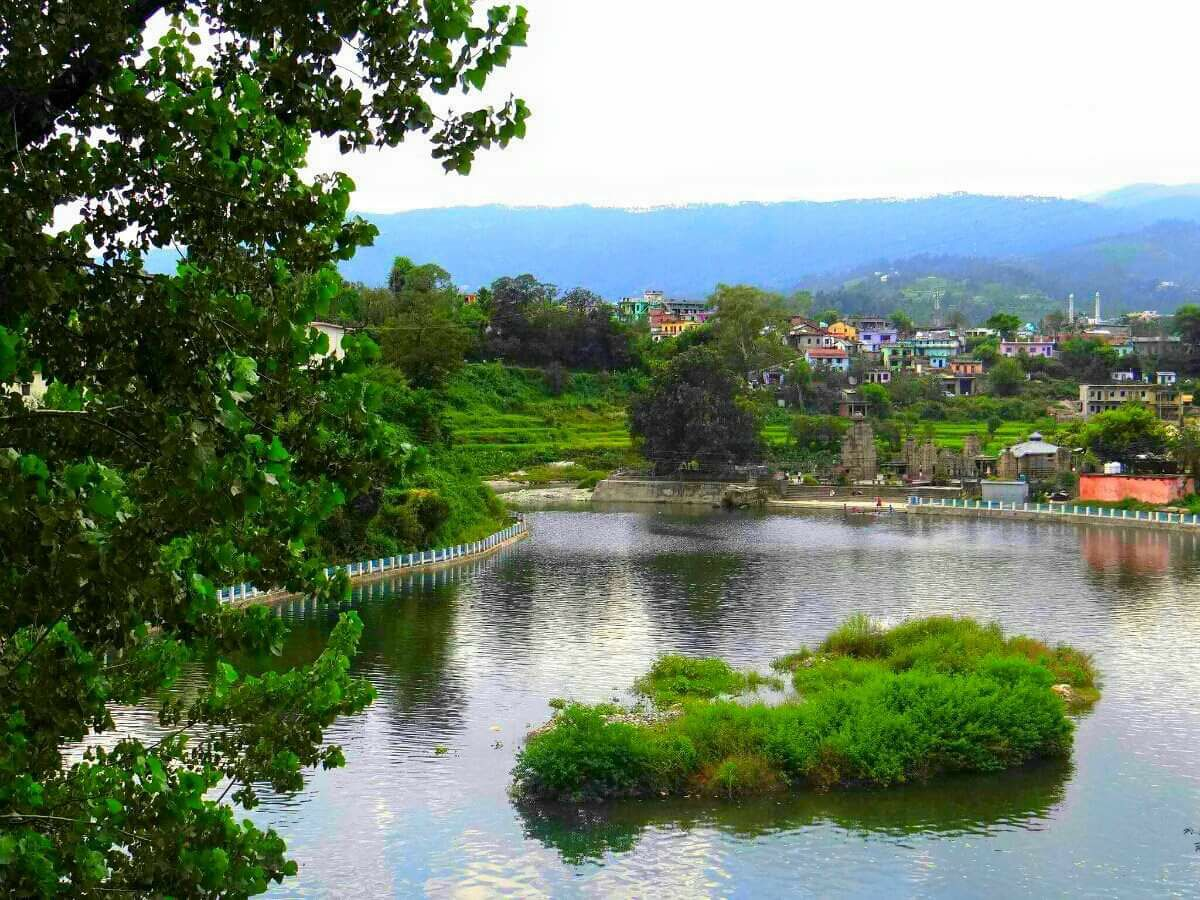
Baijnath Lake

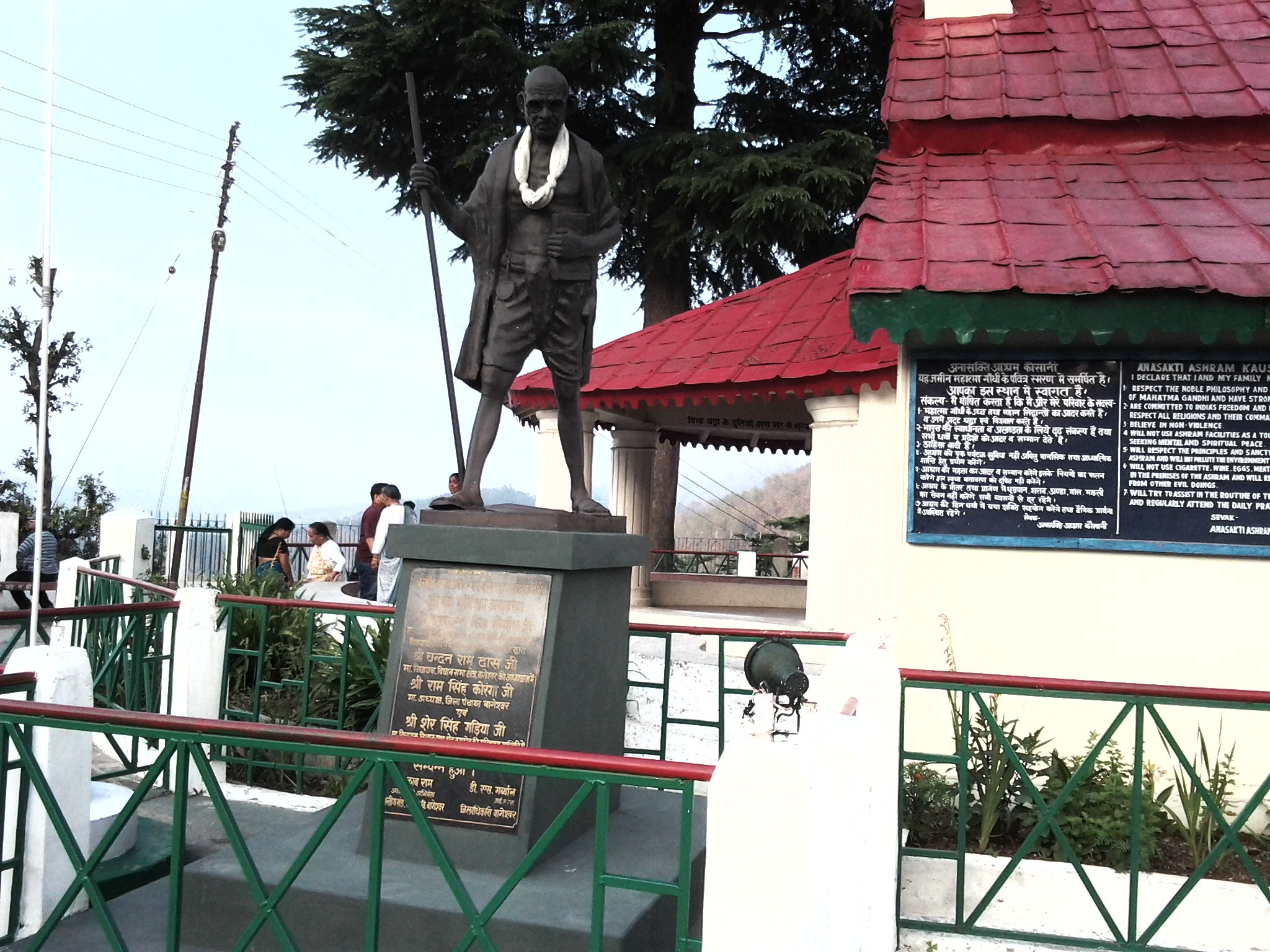
Anashakti Ashram

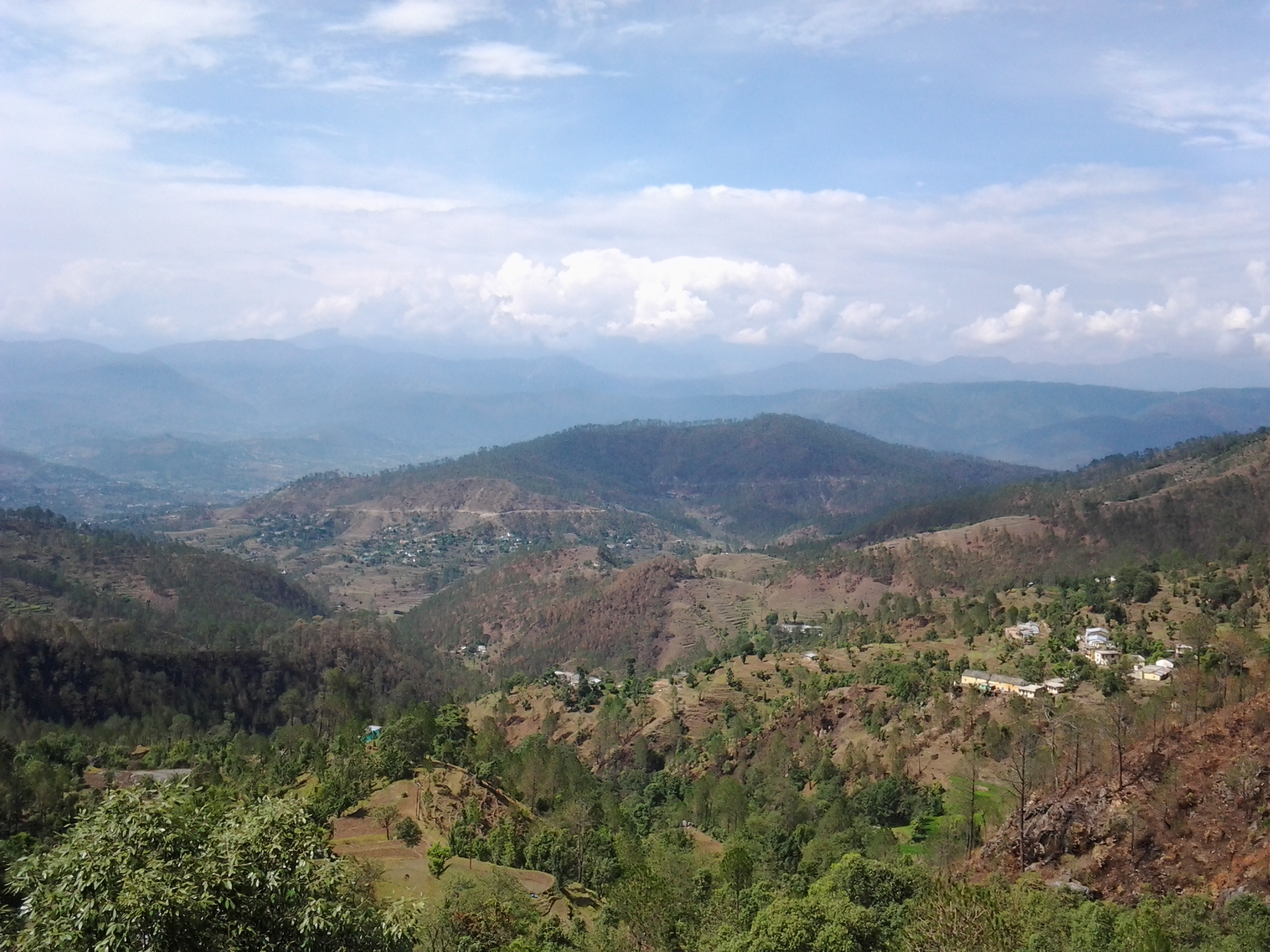
A view of the mountain range

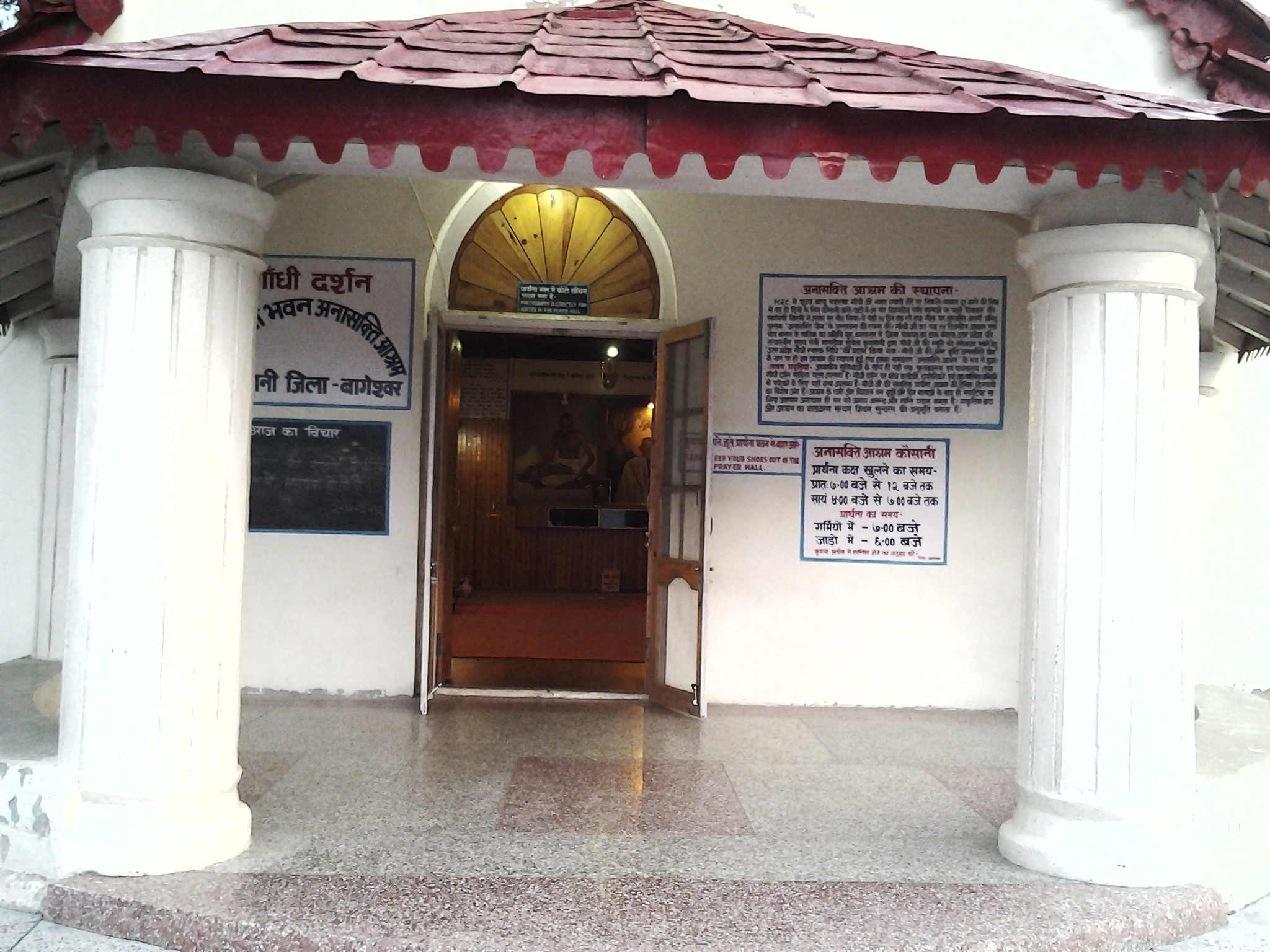
Anashakti Ashram (Aarti room)

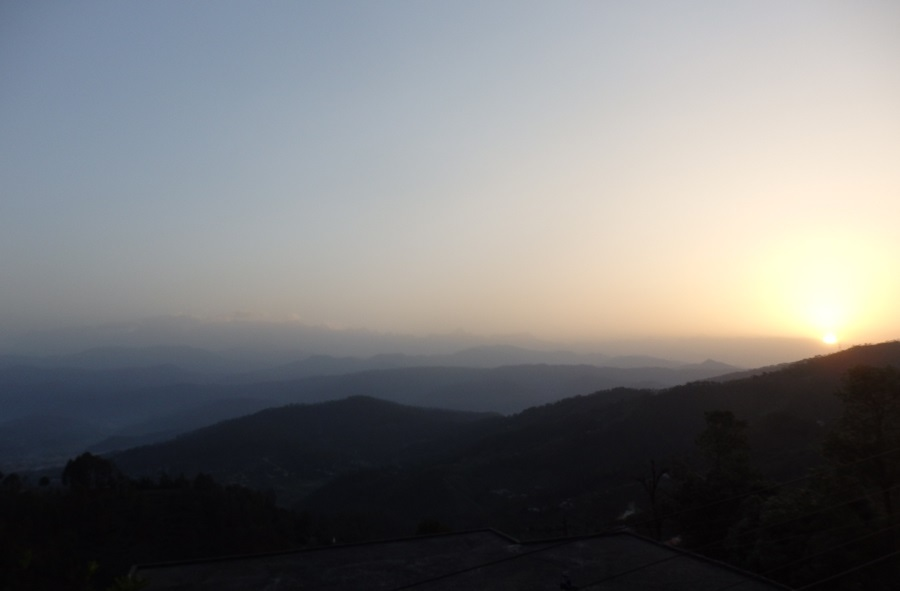
Sunrise at Kausani

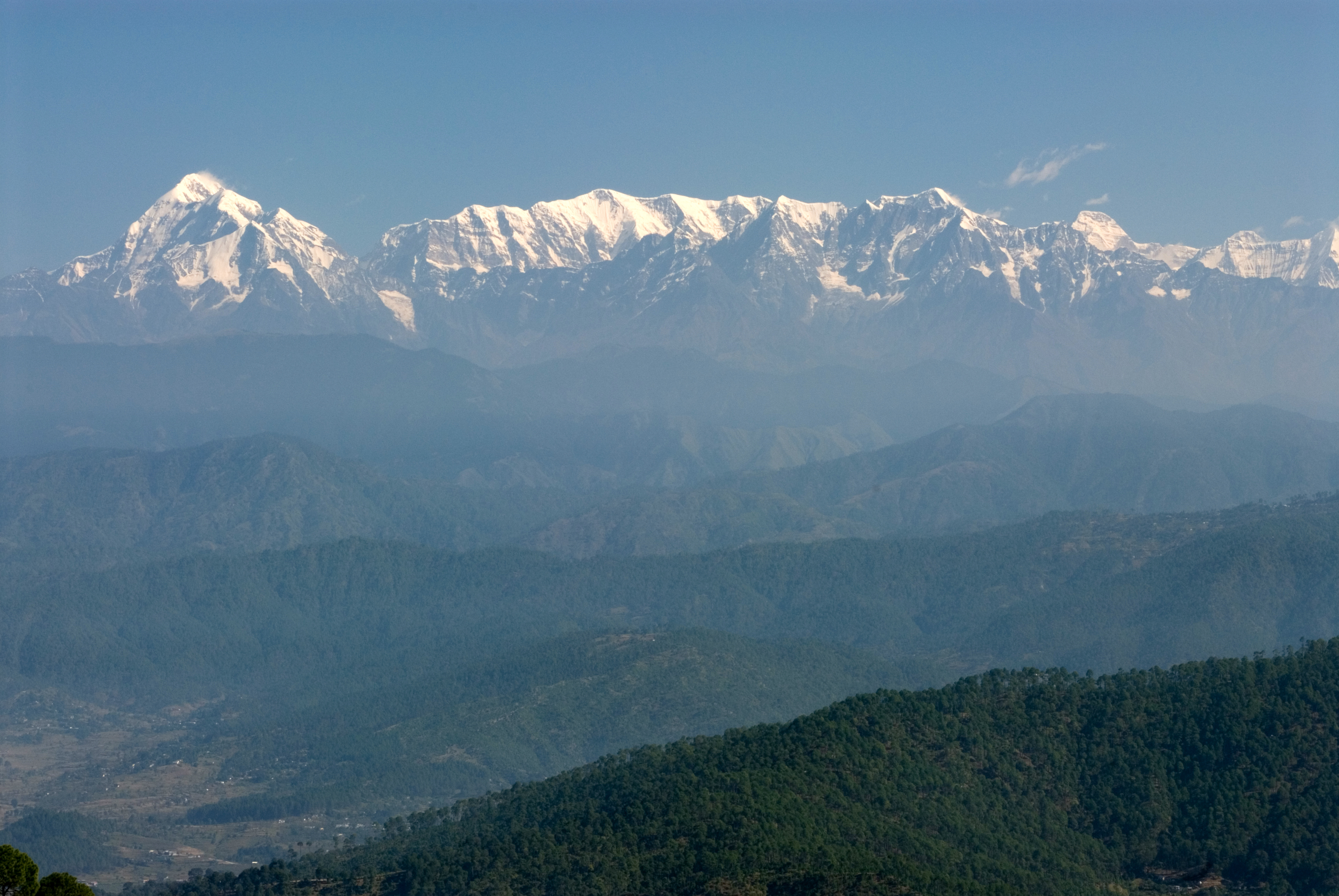
Trisul, Nanda Devi and Himalayan range from Kausani, Uttarakhand.

Lakshmi Ashram is one kilometre away from Kausani, and is a centre run by Kumauni women and dedicated to social service and the upliftment of women. Gandhiji's disciple, Sarla Behn (Kaitherine Heileman) established the ashram in 1946, and spent her life here doing social service and also established Anashakti Ashram. Lakshmi ashram is located in a solitary area among dense pine forest.

Tea gardens (5 km on Bageshwar Road), Baijnath group of temples (16.5 km on Bageshwar Road) and Bageshwar are the places of interest nearby. A collection of woollen shawls, exquisitely designed by the local weavers, can be purchased from Kumaon Shawl Emporium.

Pant Museum is named after the famous Hindi poet, Sumitranandan Pant, who was born in Kausani, the Museum has the articles of his daily use, drafts of his poems, letters, his awards etc. This museum is at a short distance from the Kausani bus terminal.

To boost the astrotourism in India, the government is setting up an observatory here under the Vibrant Villages programme.

=== Treks near Kausani ===
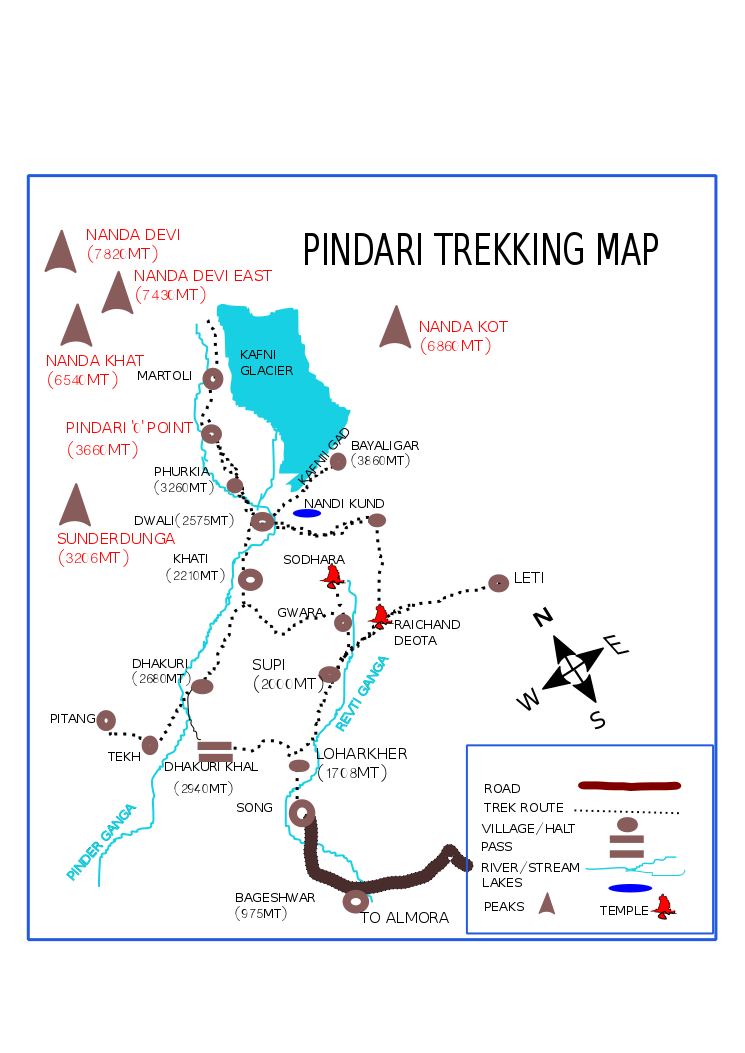
Pindari and Kafni glacier trek Route Map

- Pindari Glacier Trek
- Kafni Glacier Trek
- Sunder Dhunga Trek
- Milam Glacier Trek
- Rudrahari cave temple trek
- Kafari (3 km from Kausani)

=== Places around Kausani ===
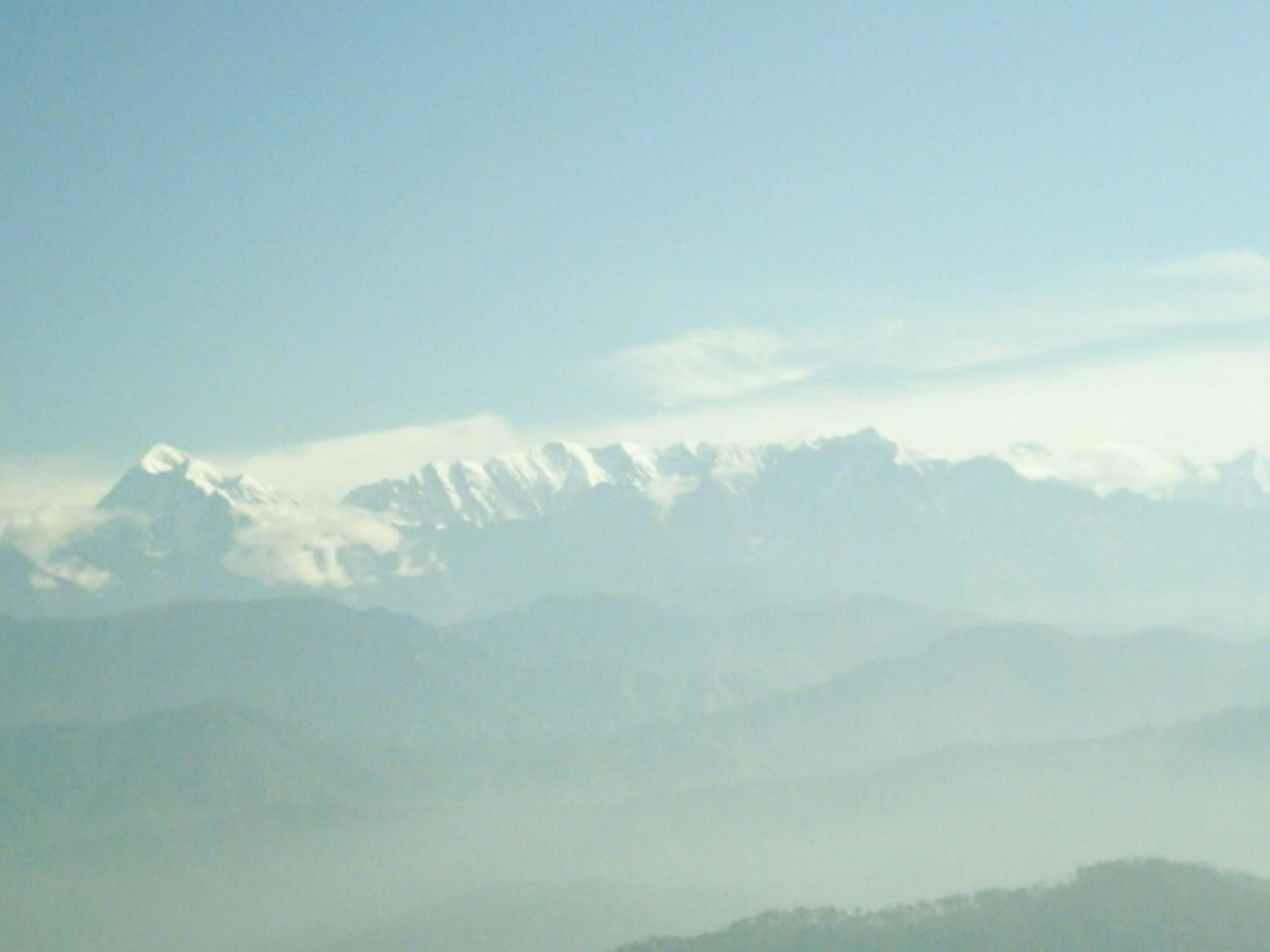
A view of Himalaya from Kausani

- Almora
- Baijnath
- Bageshwar
- Garur
- Chaukori
- Berinag
- Gwaldam
- Badhan Gari Mandir
- Angayaari Mandir
- Kote Mai Mandir
- Krishna gari
- Laubanj Village
- Rudradhari Dham
- Saroli

=== Peaks visible from Kausani ===
- Trishul
- Panchachuli
- Nanda Ghunti
- Chaukhamba

== Transport ==
Pantnagar Airport, located in Pantnagar (178 km) is the primary airport serving the entire Kumaon Region. Indira Gandhi International Airport, located in Delhi (431 km) is the nearest international airport. Kathgodam railway station (145 km) is the nearest railway station. Kausani is well connected by motorable roads with major destinations of Uttarakhand state and northern India. Bus services are provided by Uttarakhand Transport Corporation and K.M.O.U.(Kumaon Motor Owners Union limited). Regular taxis are available to Almora, Bageshwar, Garur, someshwar and other major destinations of Kumaon region.

== Education ==
There are mainly government-run, private unaided (no government help) and private aided schools in the city. The language of instruction in the schools is either English or Hindi. The main school affiliations are CBSE and UBSE, the state syllabus defined by the Uttarakhand Board of School Education of the Government of Uttarakhand. Kausani State village has higher literacy rate compared to Uttarakhand. In 2011, literacy rate of Kausani State village was 87.80% compared to 78.82% of Uttarakhand. In Kausani State Male literacy stands at 96.25% while female literacy rate was 79.76%.

== In films ==
The movie 1942: A Love Story was filmed in this region and bears a resemblance to depict pre-independence India for filming purpose.

== Notable people ==
- Sumitranandan Pant (20 May 1900 – 28 December 1977) was born in Kausani Village.
- Mahatma Gandhi (2 October 1869 – 30 January 1948) stayed here for 14 days at the Anashakti Ashram, while scripting his book titled ‘Anashakti Yoga’.
- Harish Bisht - Eastern Naval Command chief was born in Kausani Village.
