= Garur =

- Town
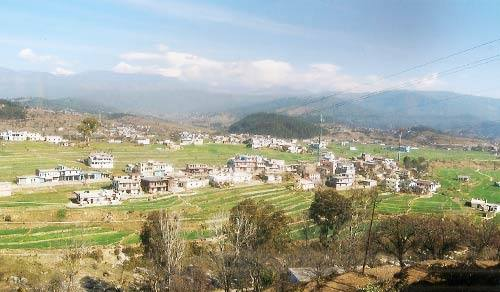
- Garur Skyline

- Location in Uttarakhand, India Garur (India)
- Coordinates: 29.89788°N 79.616798°E
- State: Baijnath Uttarakhand
- Bageshwar: Bageshwar
- Named for: Temple of Garuda, a holy hindu bird

Area
  - Total: 2.45 km^{2} (0.95 sq mi)
- Elevation: 1,150 m (3,770 ft)

Population (2011)
  - Total: 5,002
  - Density: 2,500/km^{2} (6,500/sq mi)

Languages
  - Official: Hindi
- Time zone: UTC+5:30 (IST)
- PIN: 263641
- Vehicle registration: UK
- Website: uk.gov.in

Garur is a town in the Bageshwar district of the state of Uttarakhand, India.

== Administration ==
Garur is one of the subdivisions in Bageshwar district. The subdivisional magistrate office is situated nearby at Purda. Tehsil headquarters are also in Purda. The block office of Garud Block is located in Gadsher Village. Garur has forest range offices at Gadkhet and Baijnath.

The Garur Nagar Panchayat was established on 23 July 2021. At the time of its formation, the total population of the town was 5,002 and it was spread over an area of 2.45482 square kilometres (0.94781 mi^{2}).

== Geography and demographics ==
Garur town spreads in a vast valley formed by glaciation and river erosion of Gomati and Garur Ganga. The climate of Garur is Sub-tropical to temperate lowest temperature ranging around 5 °C and highest up to 35 °C.

Nearby towns include Kausani, Baijnath, Kot Bhramari Gwaldam and Bageshwar.

Neighbouring villages include Silli, Amoli, Matena (Joshikhola), Darsani, Anna, Paye, Jijoli, Bhagartola, Dyonai, Motisyari, Baijnath, Shemar, Kajuli, Garhsher, Gagrigol, Chitrapal, Tilsari, Salani, Mattee, Bheta, Lobanj, Dangoli, Wajula, Dhaina, Sirkot, and Parkoti. Garur is about 16 km away from Kausani. Garur is 25 km away from Gwaldam.

== Heritage ==
The regions around Garur are characterised by several historical sites mainly Temples, Naulas and various other archeological remains. It has the historical privilege of once being the capital of Katyuri Dynasty that ruled over the Kumaon region during 13th and 14th century.

Around 5–6 km from Garur there is a temple of Bhagwati Mata (Kot Ka Mandir), which once was a fort owned by the Katyuri Kings. The guru Adi Shankar stayed in the temple while en route to Badrinath after closing the ears of Lord Shiva at Jageswar.

== Economy ==
The market of Garur is one of the oldest and largest in the region.

A central government scientific research center named CIMAP (Central Institute of Medicinal and Aromatic Plants) is situated near the village of Purada.

== Transport ==
After Kausani, Garur is midway between Gwaldam and Bageshwar and is a stop for KMVN buses en route to Delhi.

Train services are available up to Kathgodam, a hub from which other routes depart.
