= List of Hindu temples in Uttarakhand =

This is a list of Hindu temples in the Indian state of Uttarakhand.

Name	Location	Deity/ies worshipped	Image
Binsar Mahadev	Thalisain, Uttarakhand	Shiva	
Tarkeshwar Mahadev	Lansdowne, Uttarakhand	Shiva	
Golu Devata	Almora, Uttarakhand	Shiva	
Jageshwar Mandir	Almora, Uttarakhand	Shiva, Vishnu, Devi	
Badrinath Temple	Chamoli, Uttarakhand	Vishnu	
Kedarnath Temple	Rudraprayag, Uttarakhand	Shiva	
Yamunotri Temple	Uttarkashi, Uttarakhand	Shiva	
