= Balbhadra Singh Negi =

Indian soldier

- बलभद्र सिंह नेगी
- Born: April, 1829; Haidakholi, Pauri Garhwal, British India (present-day Uttarakhand, India)
- Died: Lansdowne, British India
- Military career
- Allegiance: British India
- Branch: British Indian Army
- Rank: Subedar-Major
- Nickname: Laat Subedar
- Conflicts: Second Anglo-Afghan War
- Awards: Order of British India; Indian Order of Merit

Balbhadra Singh Negi (April 1829–1893), known by the titles Laat Subedar and Sardar Bahadur, was a Garhwali officer of the British Indian Army who rose to the rank of subedar-major. He served in the Second Anglo-Afghan War under Frederick Roberts, later served as Roberts's aide-de-camp, and was appointed to the Order of British India and the Indian Order of Merit.

He is remembered in Garhwal chiefly for his reported advocacy of a separate battalion recruited from Garhwalis, a proposal that preceded the raising of the first Garhwali battalion in 1887, from which the Garhwal Rifles descend. In April 2006 the, Garhwal Rifles Regimental Centre at Lansdowne held the first Balbhadra Divas in his honor.
