= Rikhnikhal =

Town, Sub Tehsil and Block in Uttarakhand, India

- Tehsil and Town
- Interactive map of Rikhnikhal
- Location in Uttarakhand, India Rikhnikhal (India)
- Coordinates: 29.772°N 78.873°E
- Country: India
- State: Uttarakhand
- District: Pauri Garhwal
- Elevation: 1,360 m (4,460 ft)

Languages
  - Official: Hindi
  - Native: Garhwali
- Time zone: UTC+5:30
- PIN: 246275
- Vehicle registration: UK-12
- Website: pauri.gov.in

Rikhnikhal (also spelled Rikhanikhal) is a small hill town, development block and sub-tehsil in Pauri Garhwal district in the Indian state of Uttarakhand. It is located in the Garhwal Himalayas and forms part of the Lansdowne subdivision of the district. The sub-tehsil was created in the year 2016 and has 190 villages.

== Geography ==
It is situated in the hilly, forested terrain of the Lesser Himalayan region.Rikhnikhal experiences a sub-temperate to temperate climate that remains pleasant throughout the year.The average elevation of Rikhnikhal is approximately 1,363 meters (4,472 feet), with a range spanning from a minimum of 982 meters to a maximum of 1,839 meters.

It is located about 125 km from the district headquarters in Pauri and 210 km from the state capital, Dehradun.

== Administration ==
Rikhnikhal is a development block of Pauri Garhwal district in Uttarakhand, India. It is one of the 15 development blocks administered by the district authorities.

According to the Pauri Garhwal district administration, Rikhnikhal block contains 6 Nyay Panchayats, 81 Gram Panchayats and 190 villages.

Rikhnikhal is also a sub-tehsil under the Lansdowne subdivision of Pauri Garhwal district.

== Demographics ==
According to the 2011 Census of India, Rikhnikhal development block had a population of approximately 29,466. The population is distributed among numerous rural settlements throughout the mountainous area.

The population is predominantly rural. Garhwali is widely spoken in the surrounding region, while Hindi is also used for administration, education and communication.

== Villages ==
Rikhnikhal development block consists of numerous villages and gram panchayats. The official district administration records 190 villages and 81 gram panchayats within the block.

The villages are generally small and dispersed across the mountainous landscape. Settlement patterns are influenced by terrain, availability of water, agricultural land and road connectivity.

== Transport ==
Roads are the principal means of transportation in Rikhnikhal.

== Economy ==
The economy of the area is dependent on agriculture and despite being located close to Corbett National Park, has very little tourism activities. It is a backward area with unreliable road connectivity. In October, 2022 there was a terrible accident that led to death of 32 people.

== See also ==
- Dhumakot
- Kotrisain
- Lansdowne
- Bironkhal
