= Anupam Sinha (film director) =

Indian film director

- Born: Anupam Sinha; 12 September 1972 (age 53); Pauri Garhwal, Uttarakhand, India
- Occupation: Film Director
- Known for: Shukriya

Anupam Sinha (born 12 September 1972) is an Indian film director and screenwriter known for his work on the film Shukriya: Till Death Do Us Apart. His sibling Anubhav Sinha is also a writer and director.

== Career ==
In 2004, Anupam Sinha helmed Shukriya starring Aftab Shivdasani, Anupam Kher, Shriya Saran, which released on 8 October 2004.
