= Chakisain =

Administrative division in India

- Location in Uttarakhand, India
- Coordinates: 30.1492°N 78.982°E
- Country: India
- State: Uttarakhand
- District: Pauri Garhwal

Languages
  - Official: Hindi
- Time zone: UTC+5:30
- PIN: 246275
- Vehicle registration: UK-12
- Website: pauri.gov.in

Chakisain tehsil is a tehsil (administrative division) in Pauri Garhwal district, Uttarakhand, India. Chakisain tehsil was carved out in 2013 out of Thalisain and has 115 villages.

The tehsil is primarily rural and main economic activities in the region include agriculture, forestry, and tourism. It has many schools and one Atal Utkrisht Vidyalay. Located in Rath area of Pauri, this is part of the Srinagar Assembly constituency and is negatively affected by the migration of people due to lack of economic opportunities.
