= Jakhanikhal =

Administrative division of Pauri Garhwal district

Jakhanikhal जखणिखाळ
- Tehsil
- Location in Uttarakhand, India
- Coordinates: 30.0183°N 78.5252°E
- Country: India
- State: Uttarakhand
- District: Pauri Garhwal
- Elevation: 1,500 m (4,900 ft)

Languages
  - Official: Hindi
  - Native: Garhwali
- Time zone: UTC+5:30 (IST)
- PIN: 246173
- Telephone code: 01386
- Vehicle registration: UK-12
- Website: pauri.nic.in

Jakhnikhal is a tehsil, or administrative division, in the Pauri Garhwal district of the state of Uttarakhand, India. It contains 109 revenue villages taken out of Yamkeshwar and Lansdowne tehsils in 2017.

The economy of Jakhnikhal is primarily agricultural, with rice, wheat, and other crops being the main sources of income for the local population. There are also a number of small businesses, such as shops, hotels and restaurants, in the area. The tehsil is part of Yamkeshwar assembly constituency.
