= Binsar Mahadev =

Hindu temple in India

Bindeshwar Mahadev
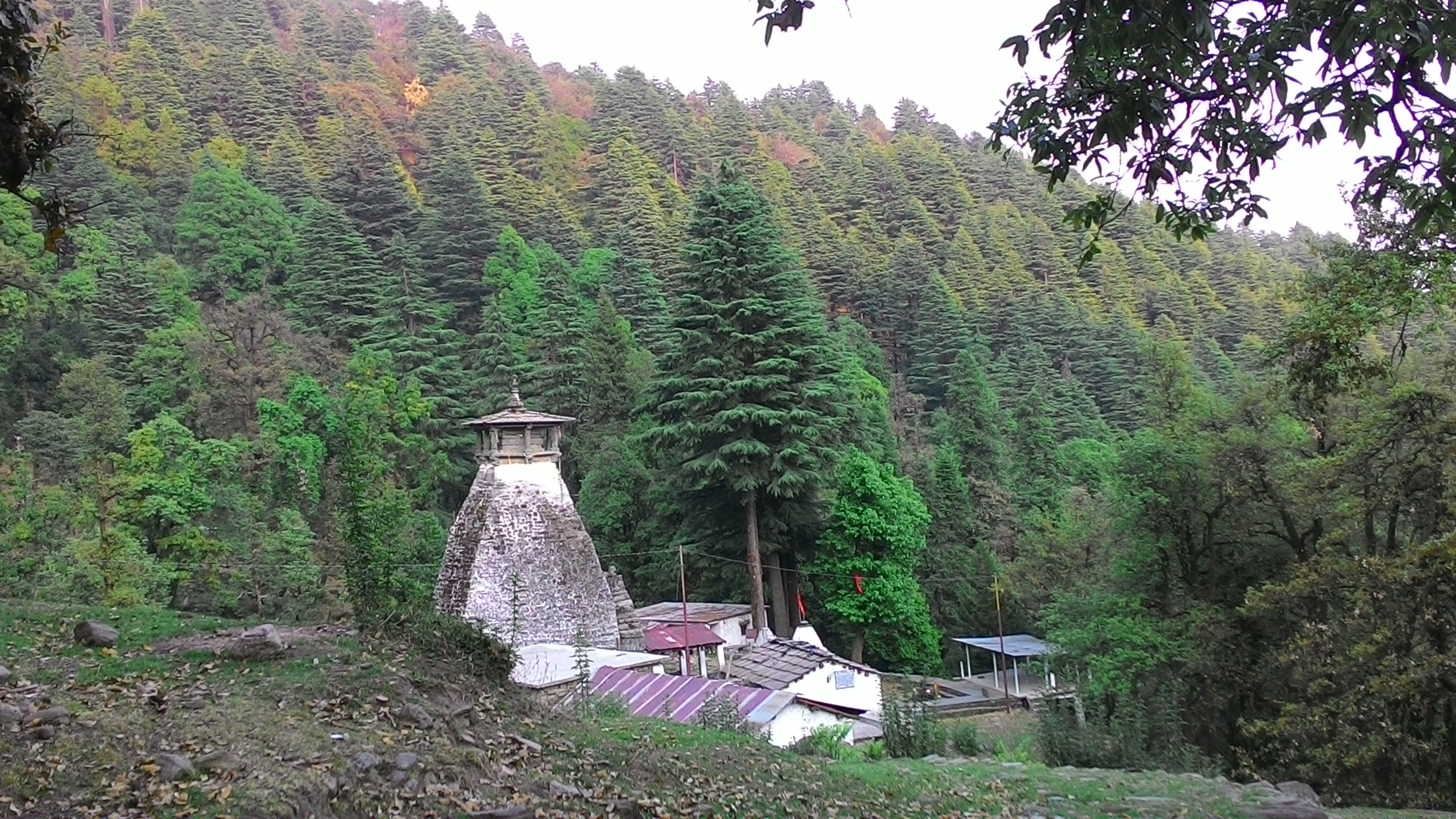
- Binsar temple before demolition, with Deodar forest in the background

- Location in Uttarakhand

Religion
- Affiliation: Hinduism
- District: Pauri Garhwal district

Location
- Location: Chauthan, Thalisain, Pauri Garhwal
- State: Uttarakhand
- Country: India
- Coordinates: 30.0165°N 79.1621°E

Architecture
- Type: Hindu
- Elevation: 2,500 m (8,202 ft)

Bindeshwar Mahadev Temple, also known as Binsar Devta or simply Binsar, is an ancient Hindu rock temple dedicated to Lord Shiva, worshipped as Bindeshwar, a popular deity in this region. At an altitude of 2480 meters above mean sea level, it is situated in Bisaona village, which falls in the Chauthan region of Thalisain Block in the Pauri Garhwal District of the Indian state of Uttarakhand. This temple is set amidst dense forests of birch, deodar and rhododendron. The original temple structure held great archaeological significance, but it was demolished by politicians in order to create a new structure. The central chamber of the temple features the idols of Ganesha, Shiva-Parvati and Mahishasuramardini. A fair is organized there on Vaikuntha Chaturdashi every year.

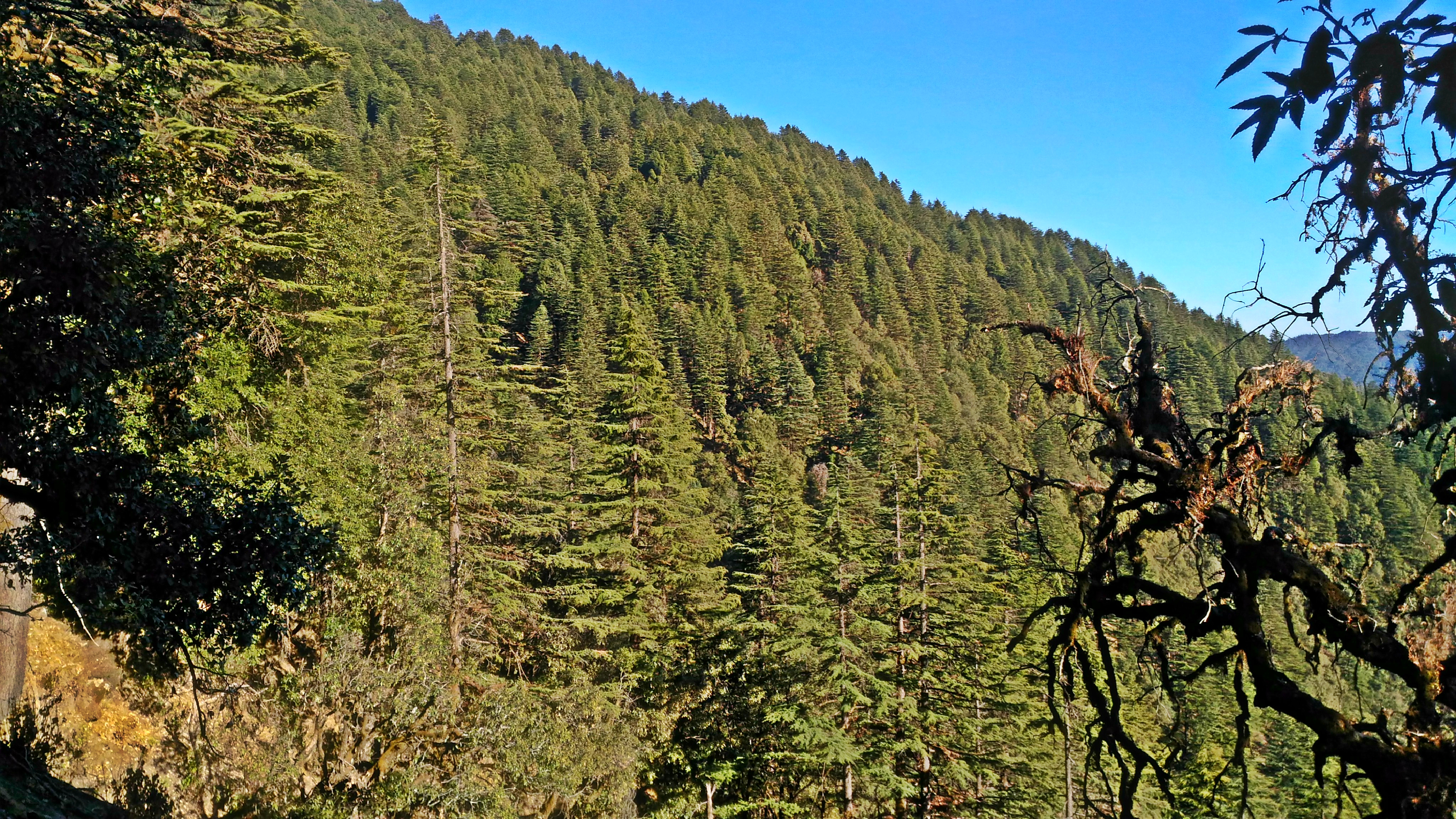
Deodar forest at Bindeshwar Mahadev

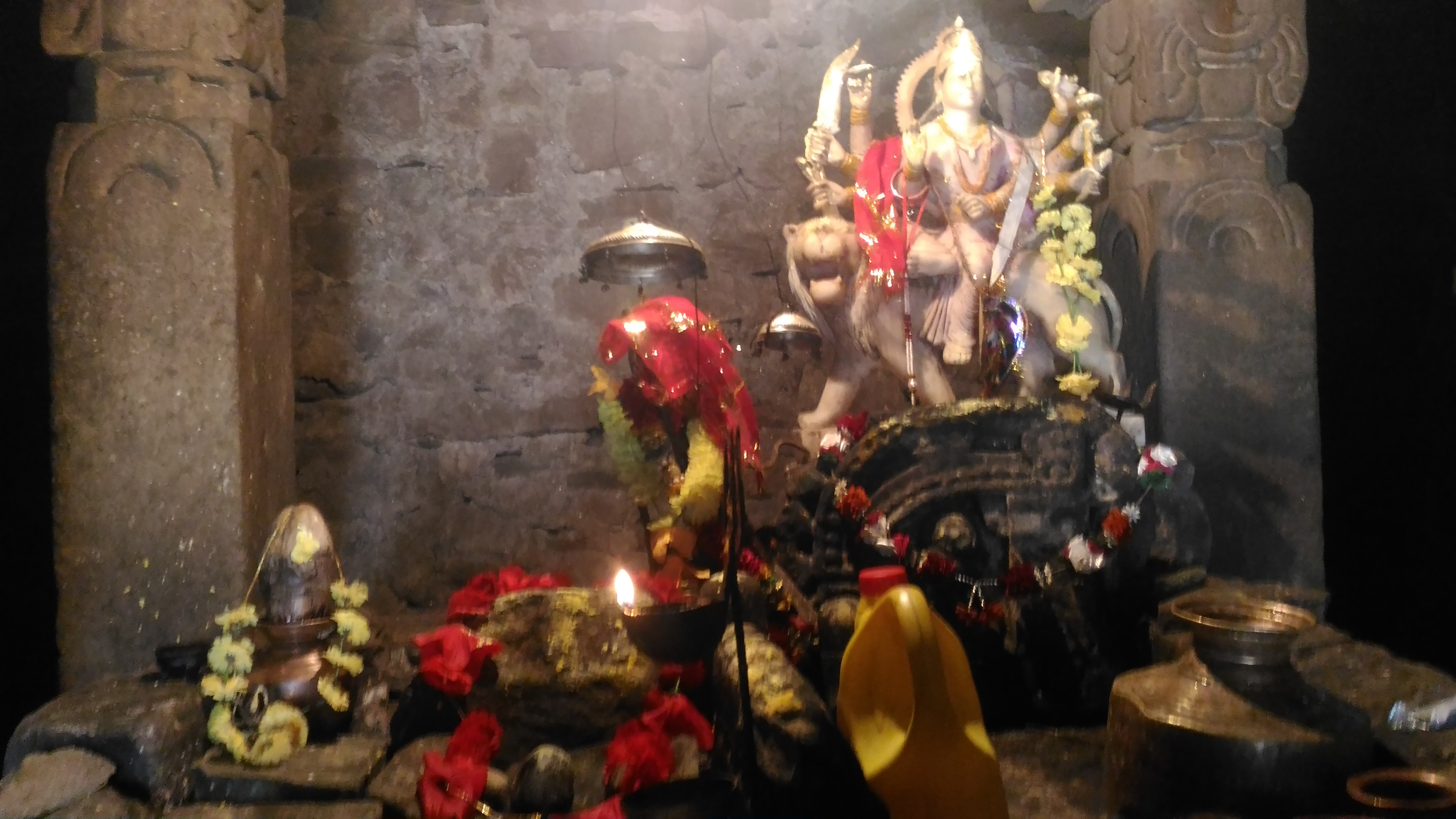
Sanctum Sanctorum of the temple with carved monolithic pillars

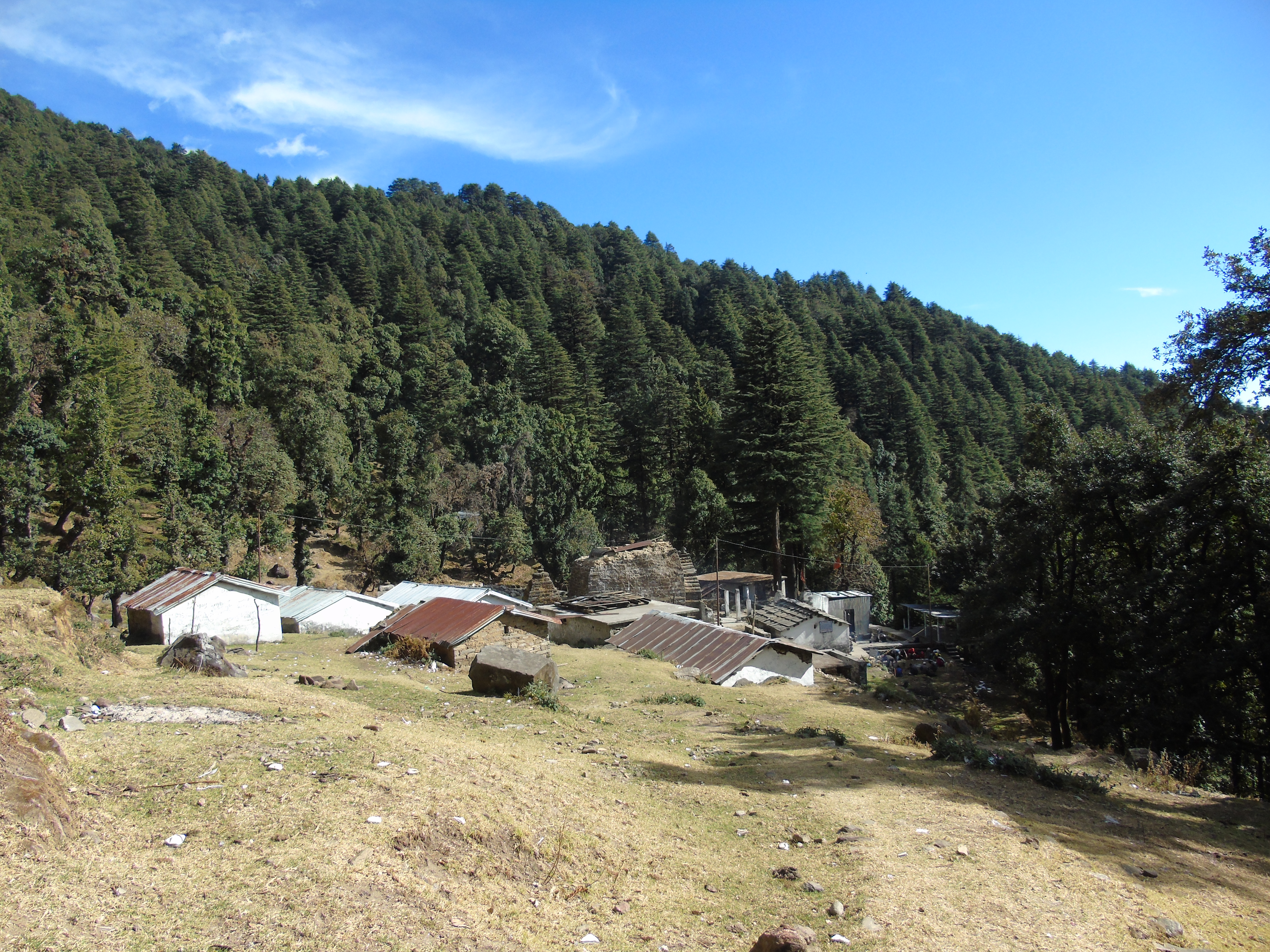
The temple after demolition in October 2017

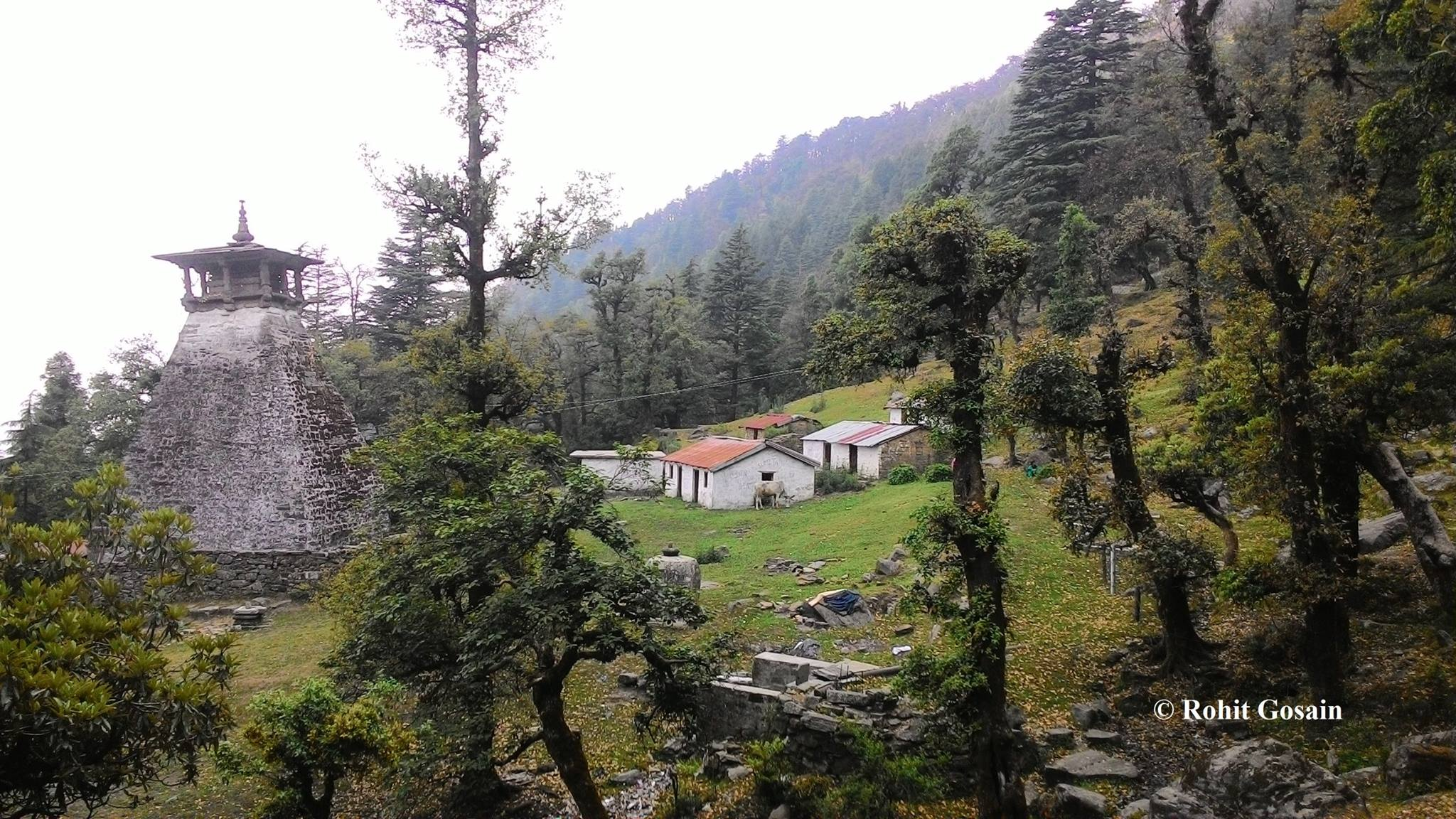

== History ==
The temple is believed to have been constructed by Maharaja Prithu in memory of his father, Bindu in the 9th/10th century. It is built in the Katyuri style. It was a contemporary of the Jageshwar and Adi Badri group of temples, but no documented history of it exists. Many rock-cut idols, shrines, and Shiva Lingams can be found within the valley where the temple is located. While many historians and researchers visited the location, no one produced accurate historical data related to the temple.

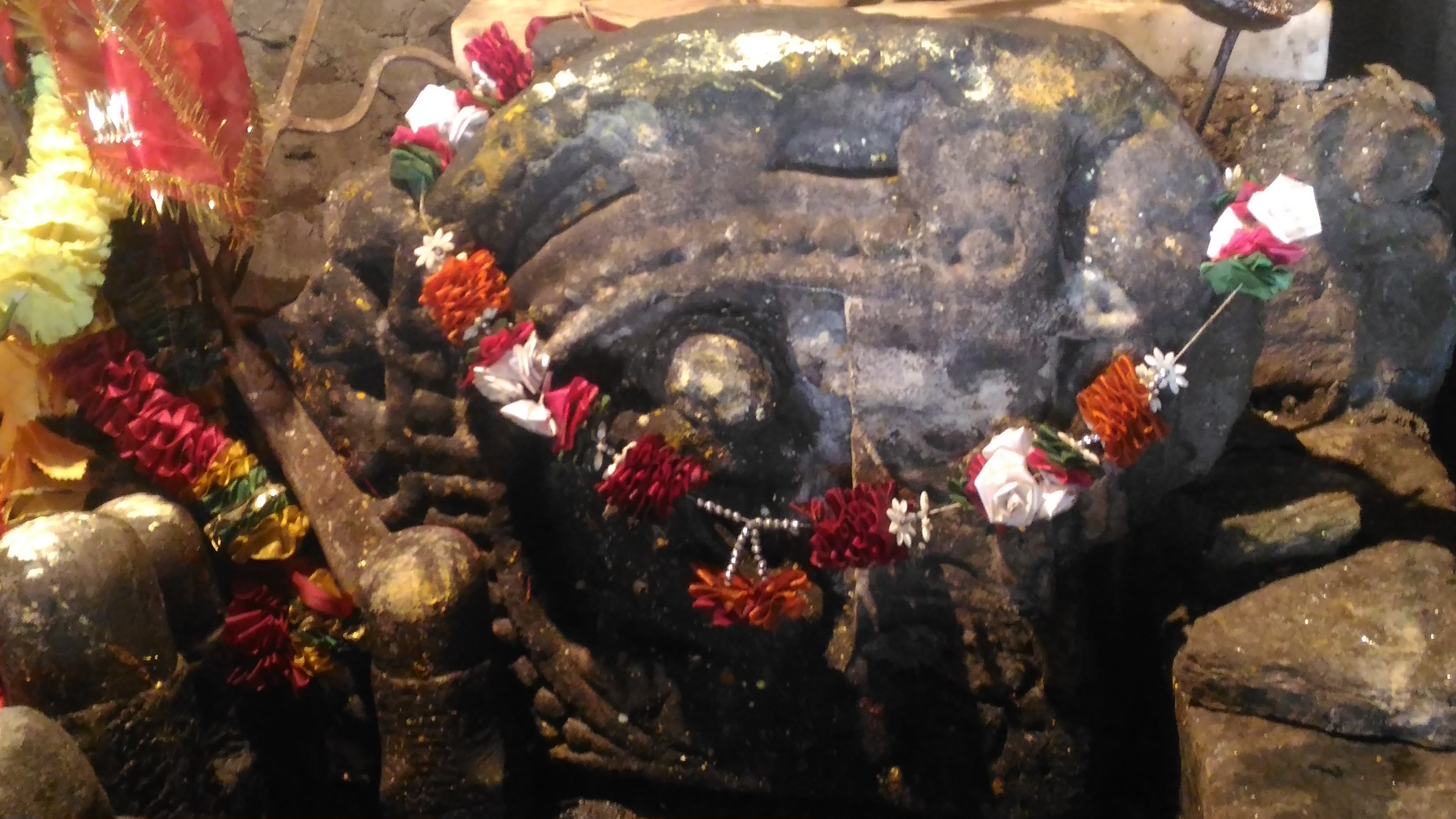
An unknown deity's idol - considered as the main deity at Bindeshwar temple

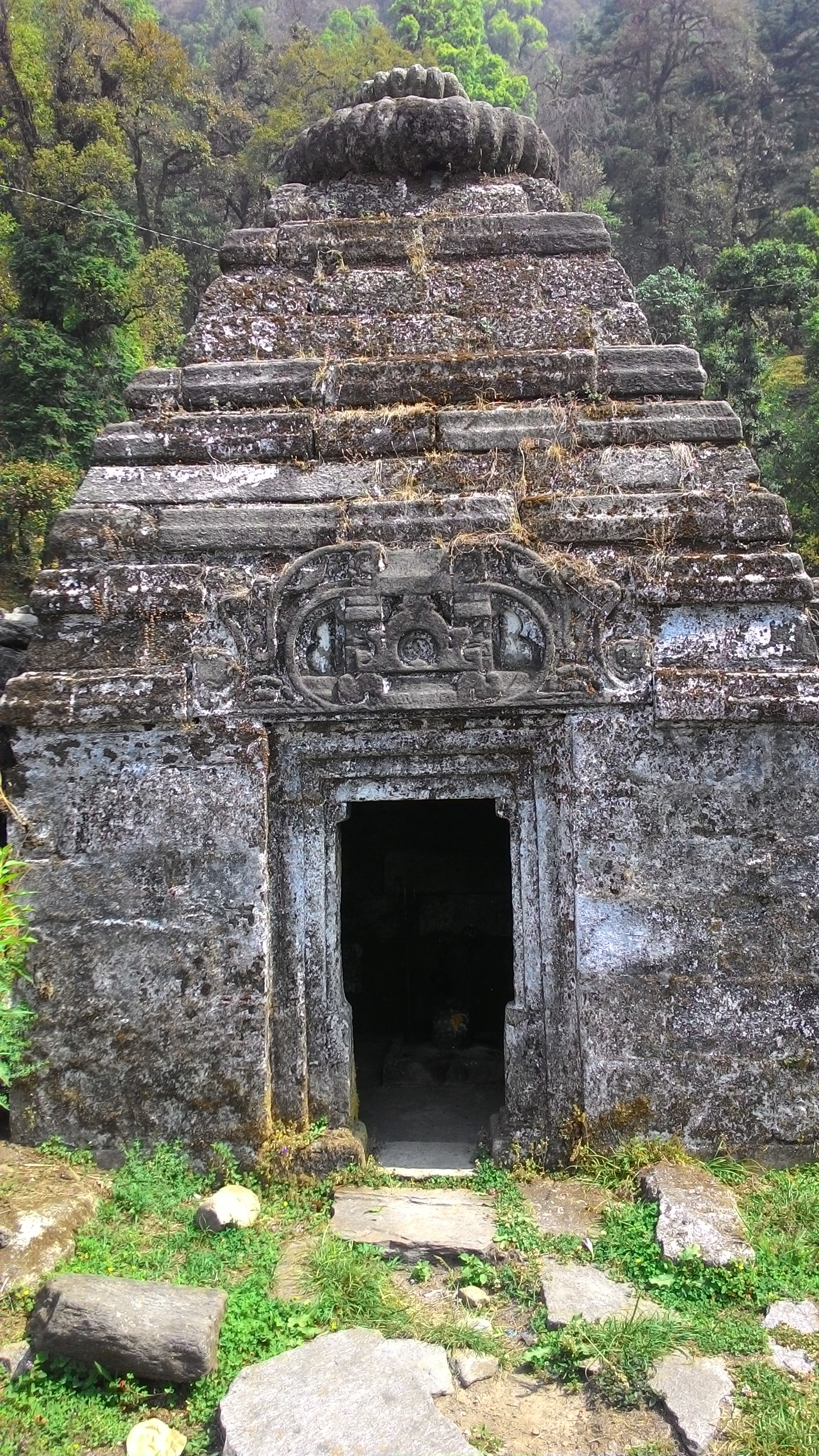
Ancient rock temple in Binsar

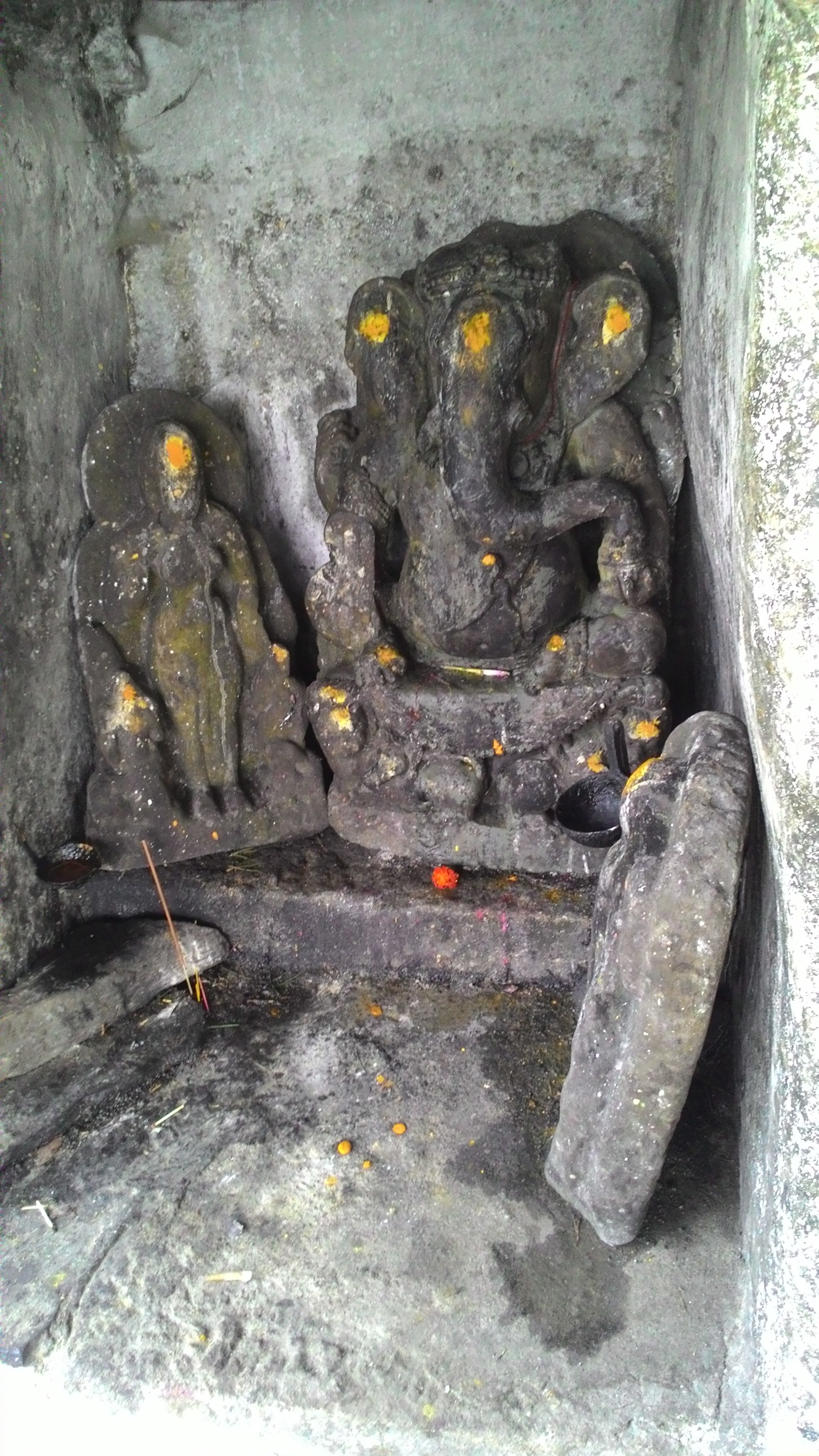
Ancient rock-cut idols in Binsar

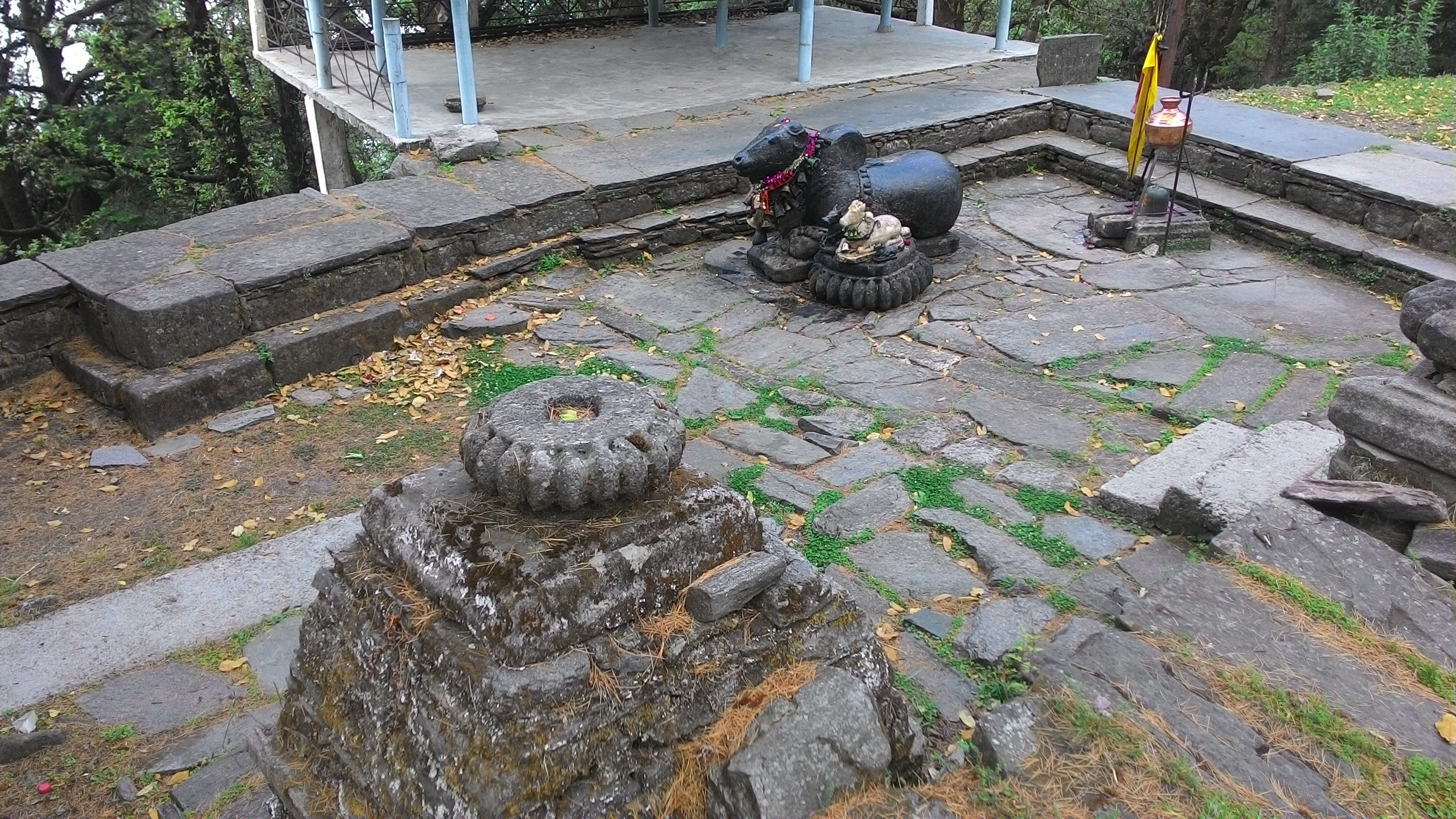
Temple complex

== Folklore ==
The lack of any recorded history led to the emergence of legends and folklore. According to one belief, the temple was built by the Pandavas in one night while in exile. Another legend says that the temple was built by a king named Bindu. Alternatively, the temple may have been built by lord Vishwakarma. A strange symbol inscribed outside the temple is said to be in his handwriting. The temple was shrouded in mystery. In the olden days, its central room housed a circular, narrow and deep reservoir of cold water, resembling a well. This formed the main shrine. Many idols were kept around it. A snake was said to dwell inside the reservoir. In recent times, the well was covered with flat stones. Later, water seeped out of the rocks, suggesting the existence of a reservoir underneath.

== Geography ==
The temple is tucked in a small valley in the vast Dudhatoli region. The altitude of the temple complex ranges from 2,480 meters (8,136 ft) to 2,500 meters (8,202 ft.). The complex is sited in a meadow. The forest around the temple is one of the densest temperate forests in Uttarakhand, with deodar cedar (Cedrus deodara) as the dominant tree species, which, further east, becomes the only tree species. The valley is dotted with multiple cool water springs, some of which channelled into rock formations (known as Mangārā in the Garhwali language), while others flow naturally (known as dhārā). The surrounding ridges have an average elevation of 2,700 meters (8,860 ft.) with dense, mixed, broadleaf forests, comprising kharsu, oaks, hornbeams, maples, rhododendrons, hazels, Corylus jacquemontii, and dozens of other tree species.

== Climate ==
The region experiences temperate climate during the summer season with pleasant days and cool nights. Monsoon brings rain and covers the surrounding forests in the mist. The rainy season brings biodiversity, enriching it with verdant greenery along with ferns, mosses, lichens, mushrooms, birds and insects. The rock temples turn green after they are covered in moss and lichens. Winter brings snow, while and daytime temperature fluctuates. The days are warm, shiny, and pleasant with temperatures around 15°, whereas the nights are cold. Sun rises late and sets early during this period, making the weather even colder during the dark hours. Frost is common during this season and snowfall ranges from 1 feet (30 cm) to as high as 4 feet (120 cm), and more.

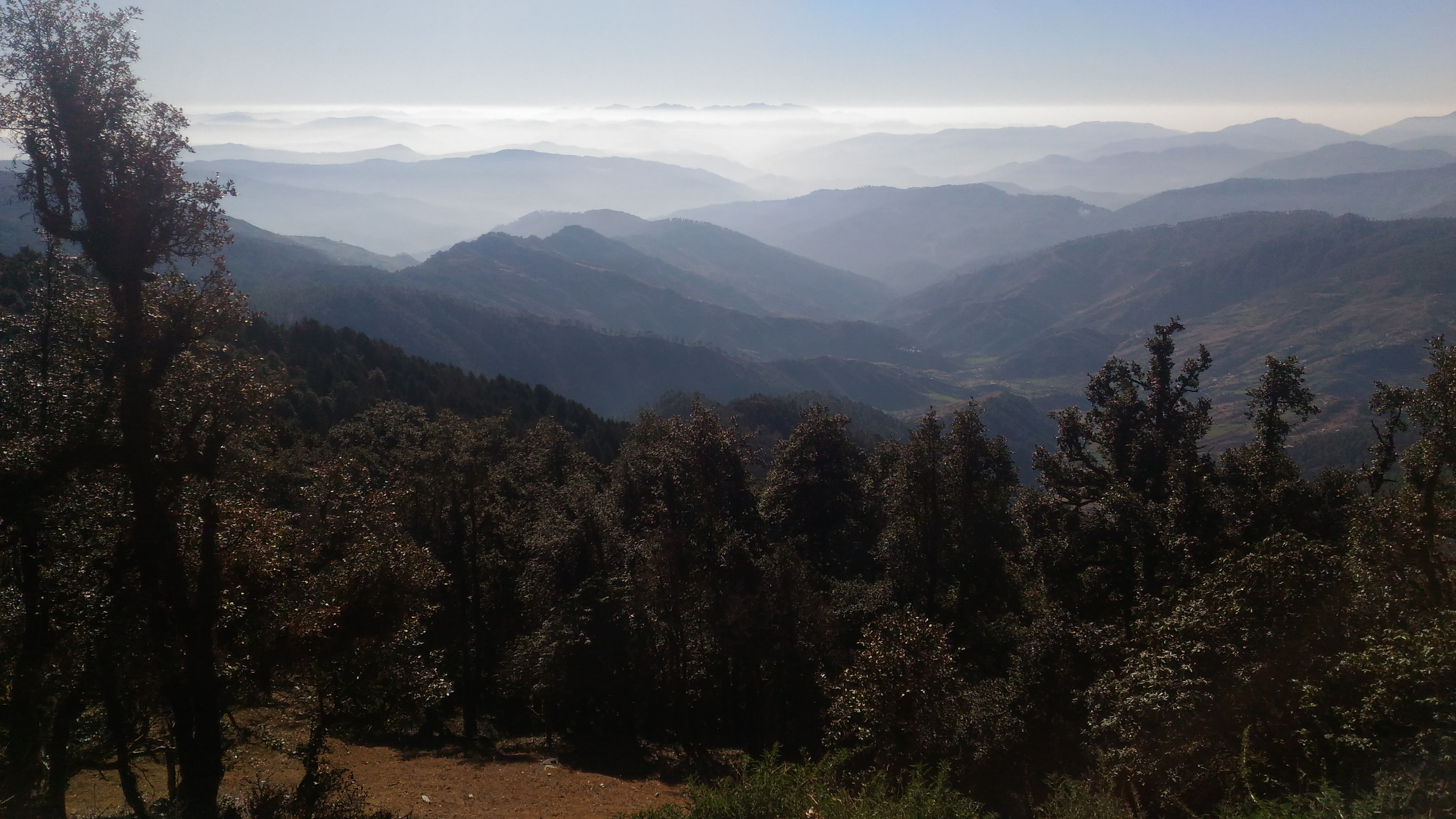
Chauthan valley as seen from Bindeshwar temple

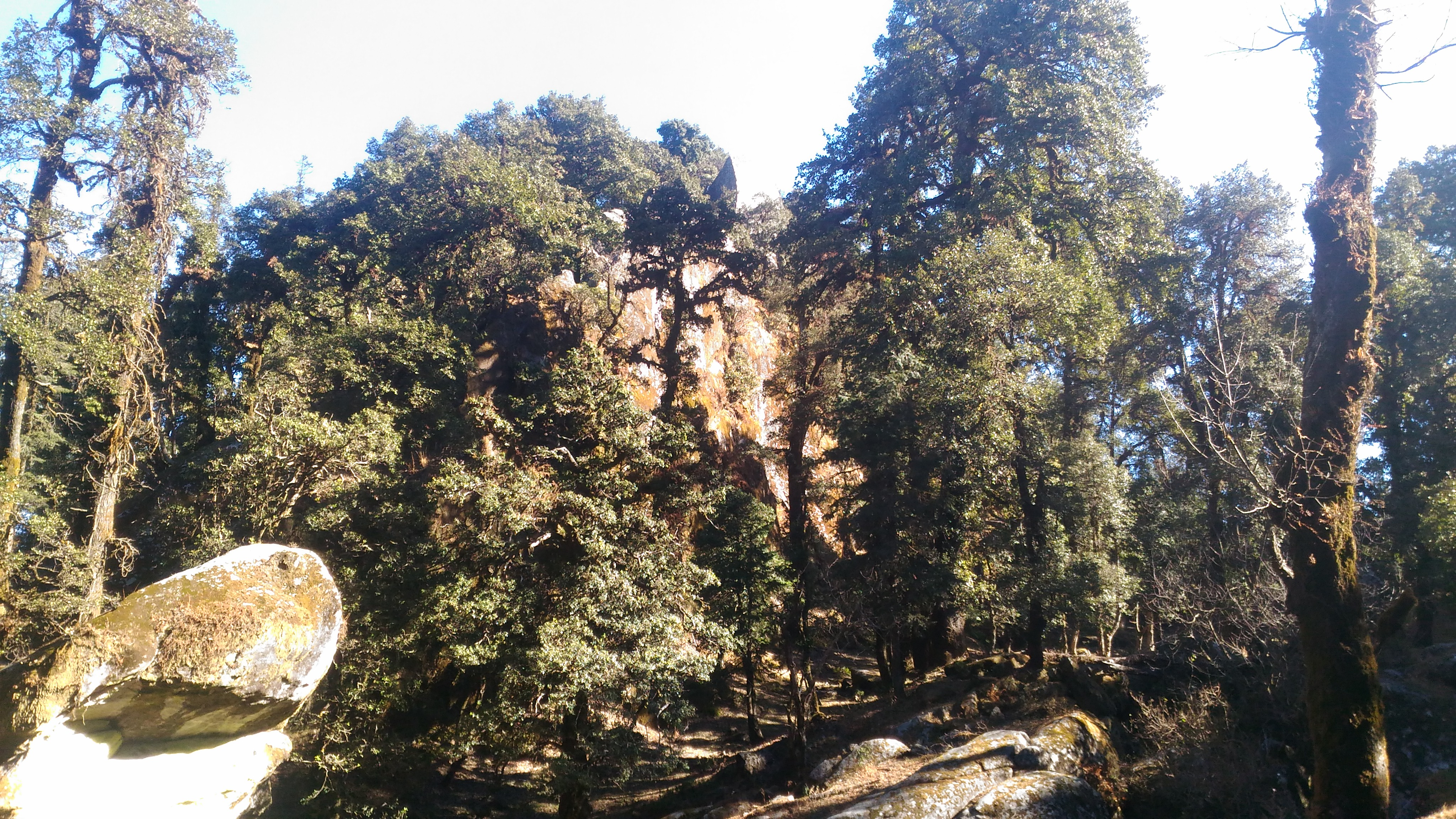
Approaching pre-historic Dwarpal caves

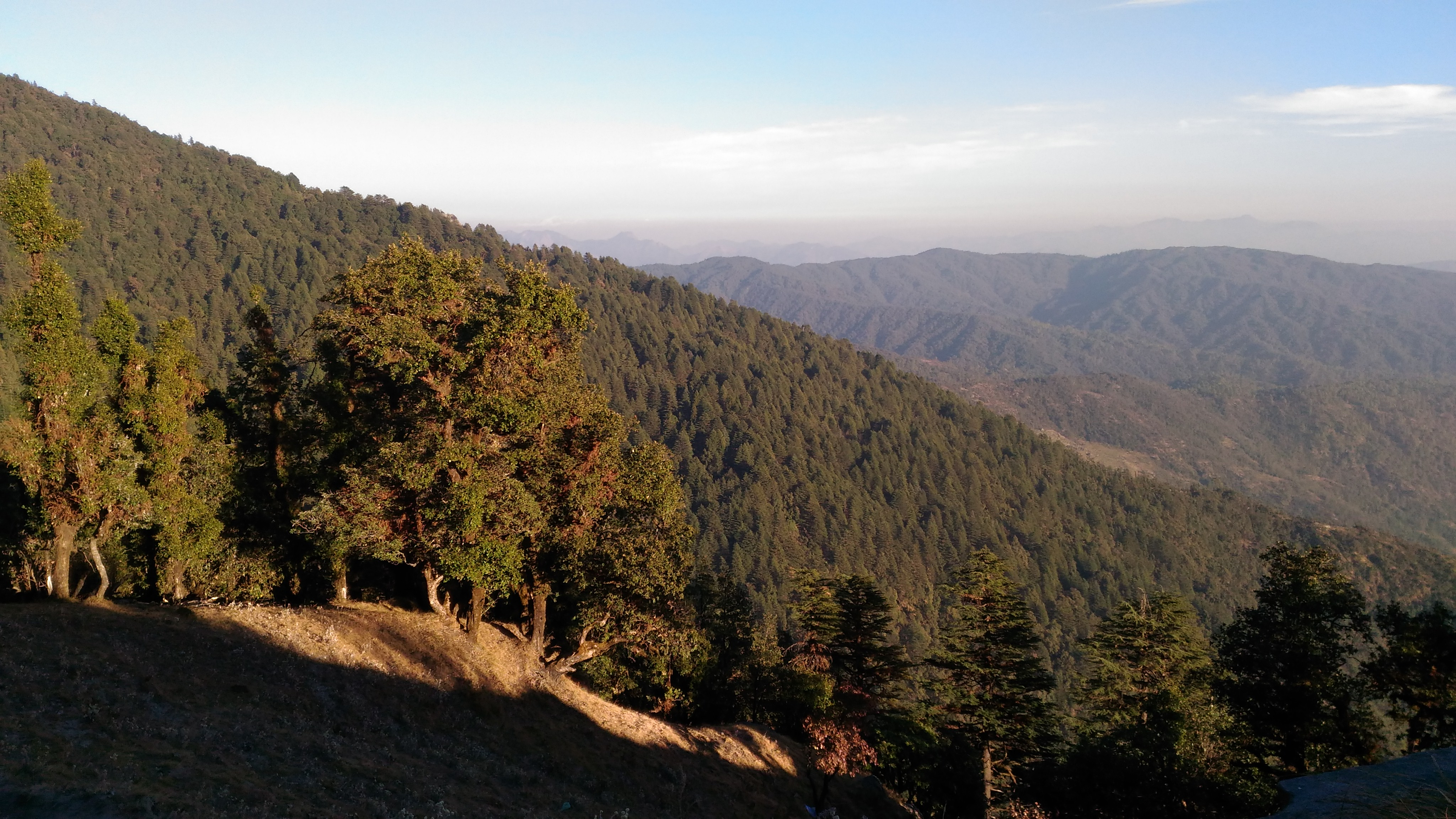
Deodar Forest saw while approaching Binsar Valley

== Image gallery ==
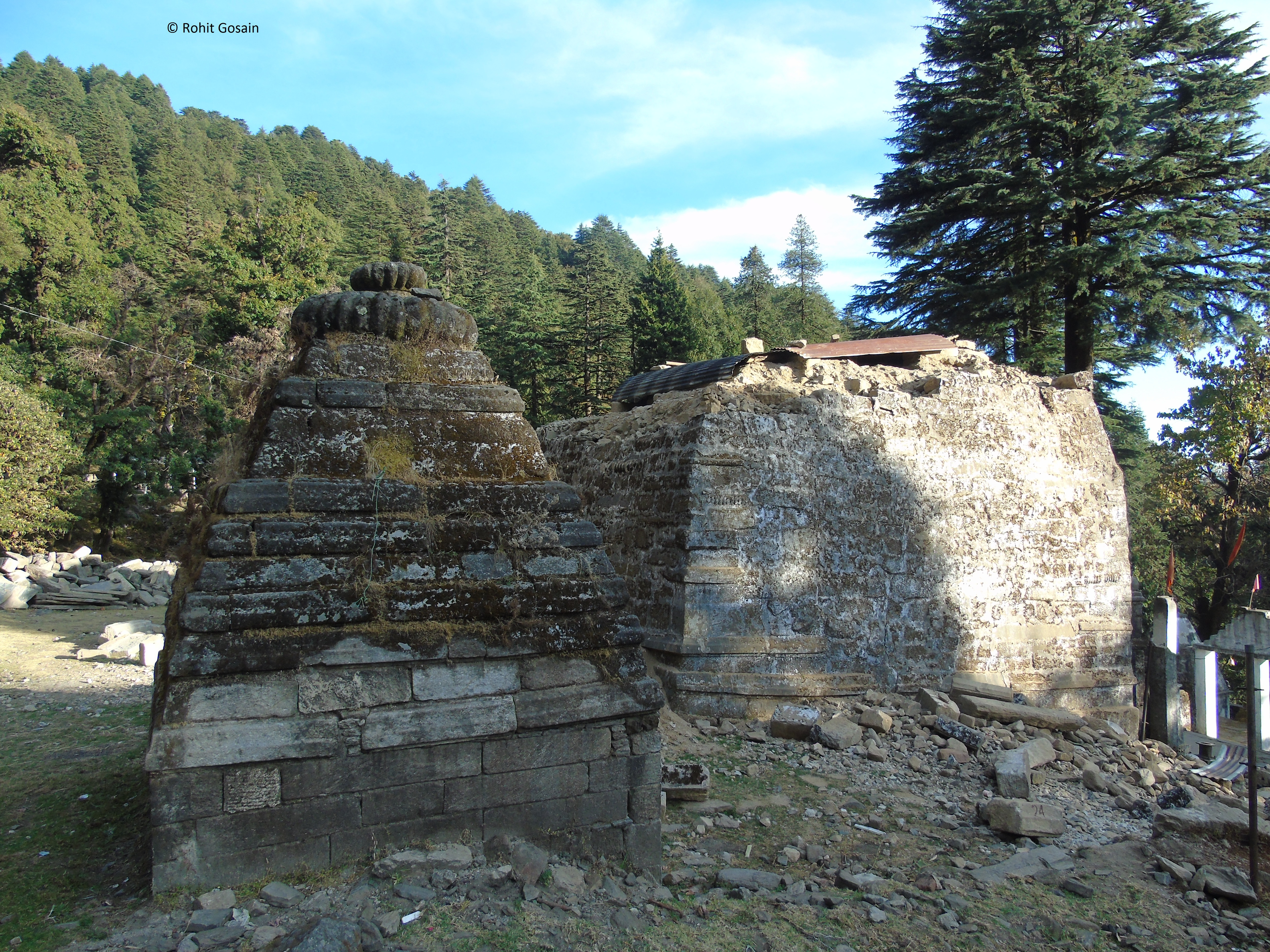
The temple after demolition in October 2017

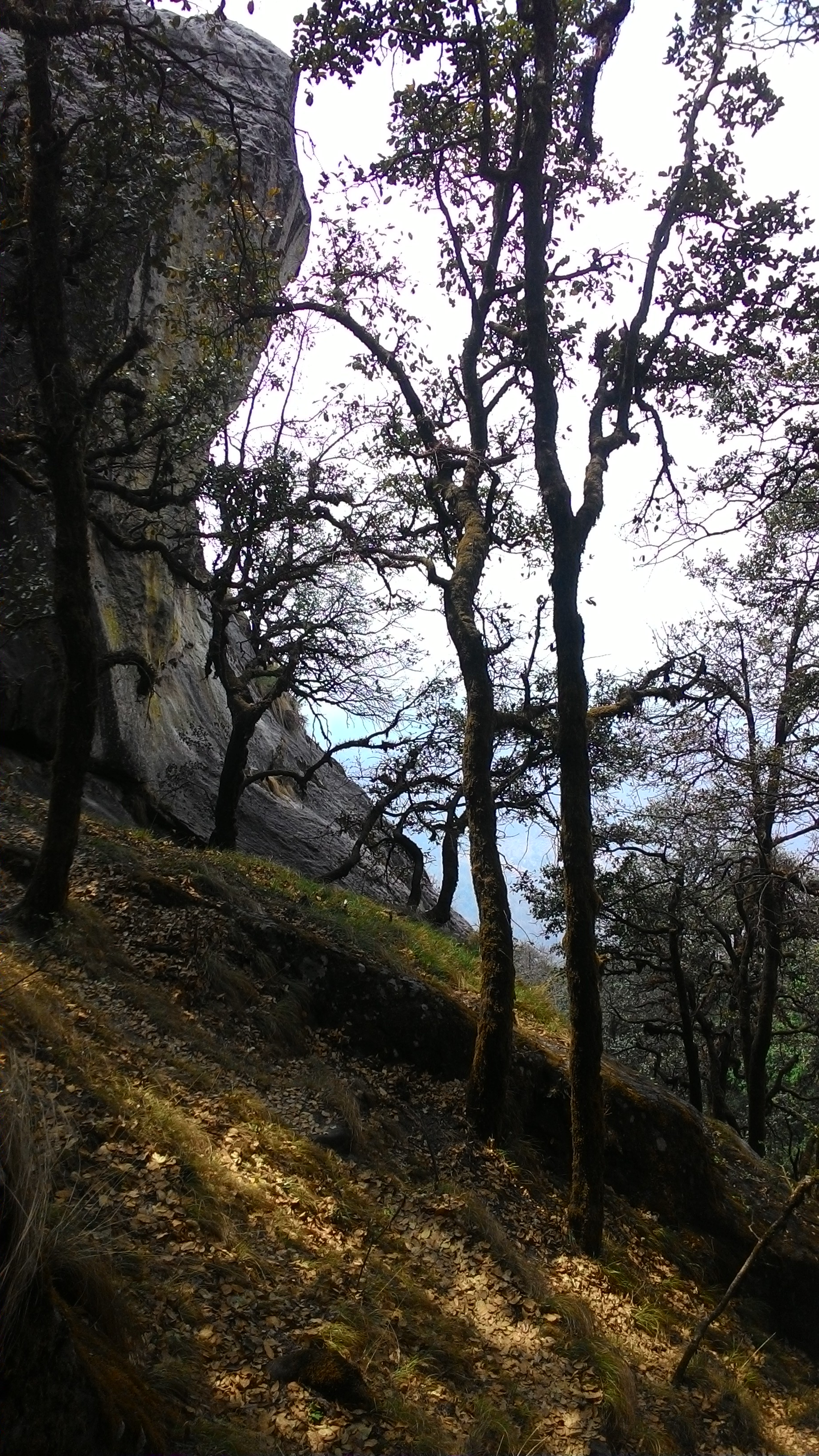
Brahmadhungi

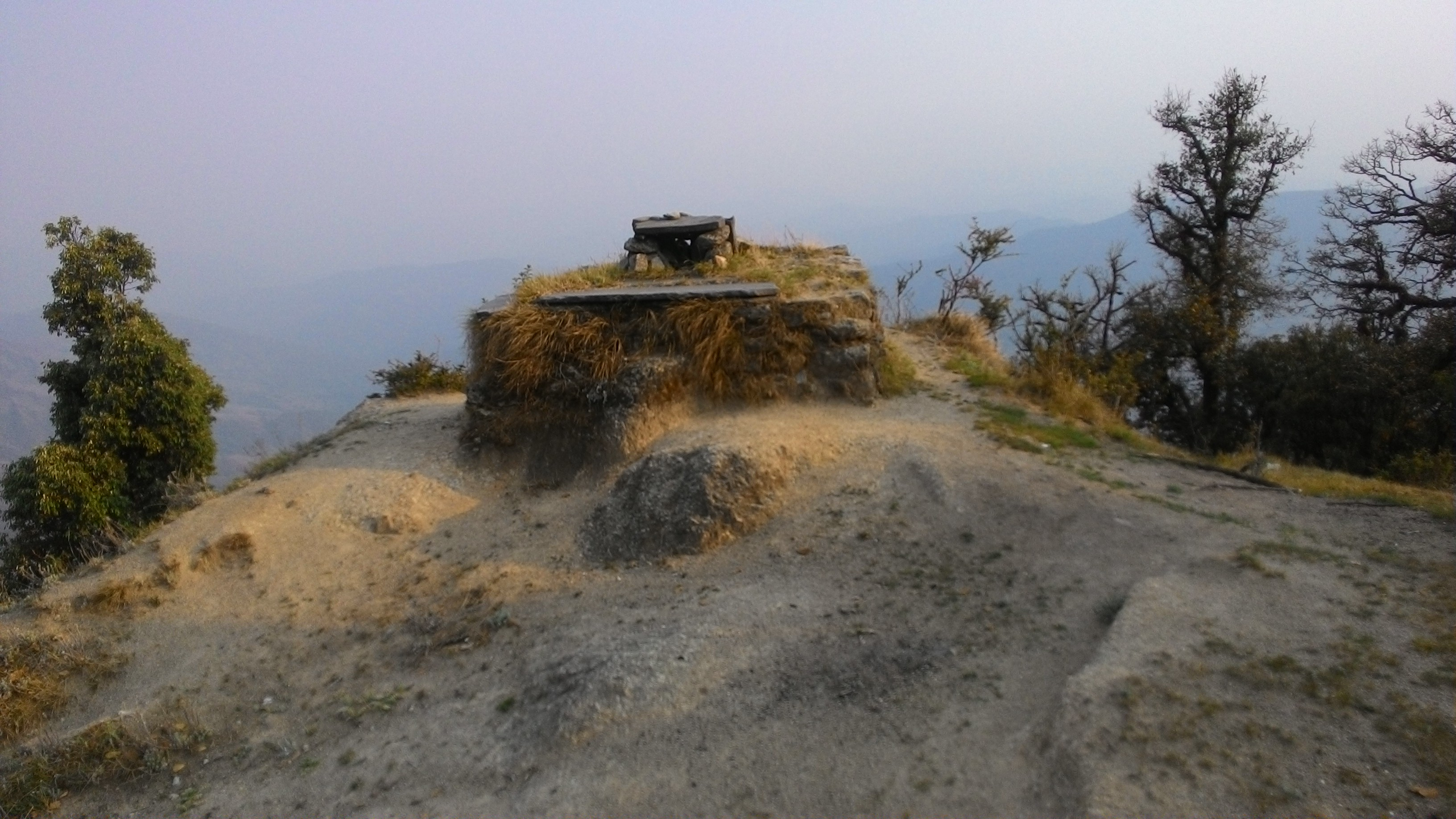
A small shrine made with rocks seen on Peethsain-Binsar route

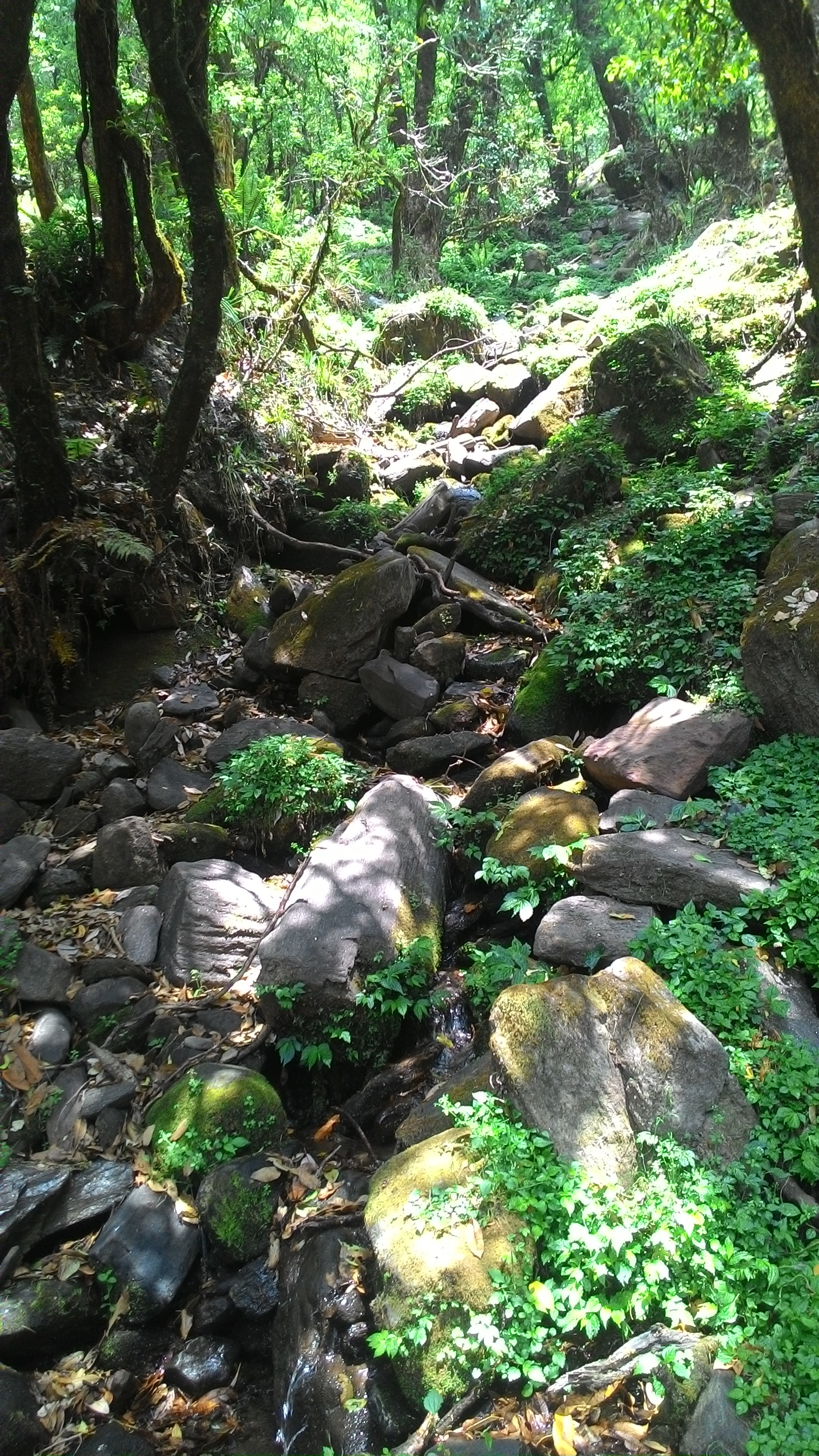
A freshwater spring in Binsar

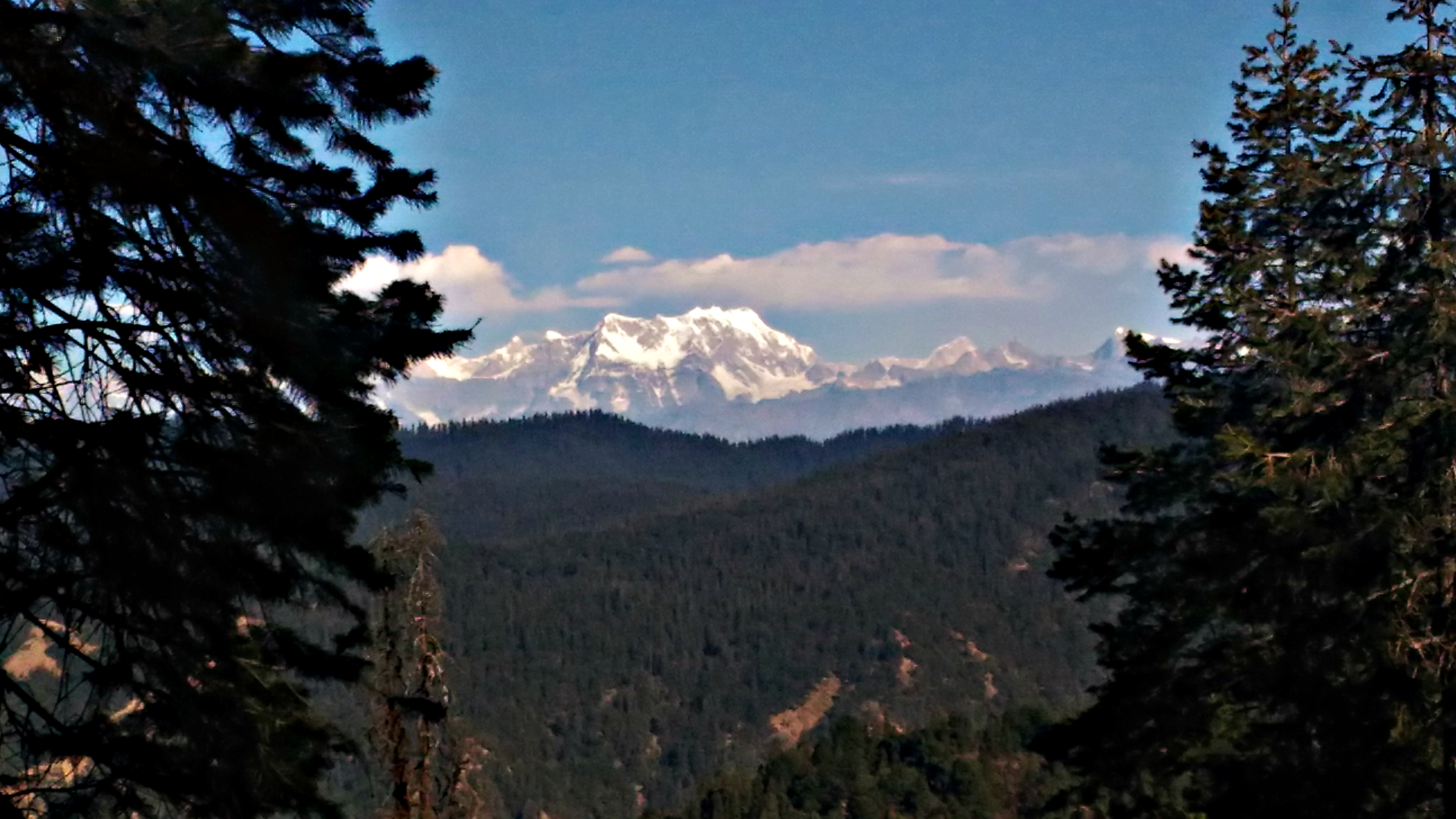
View of Chaukhamba from the ridge

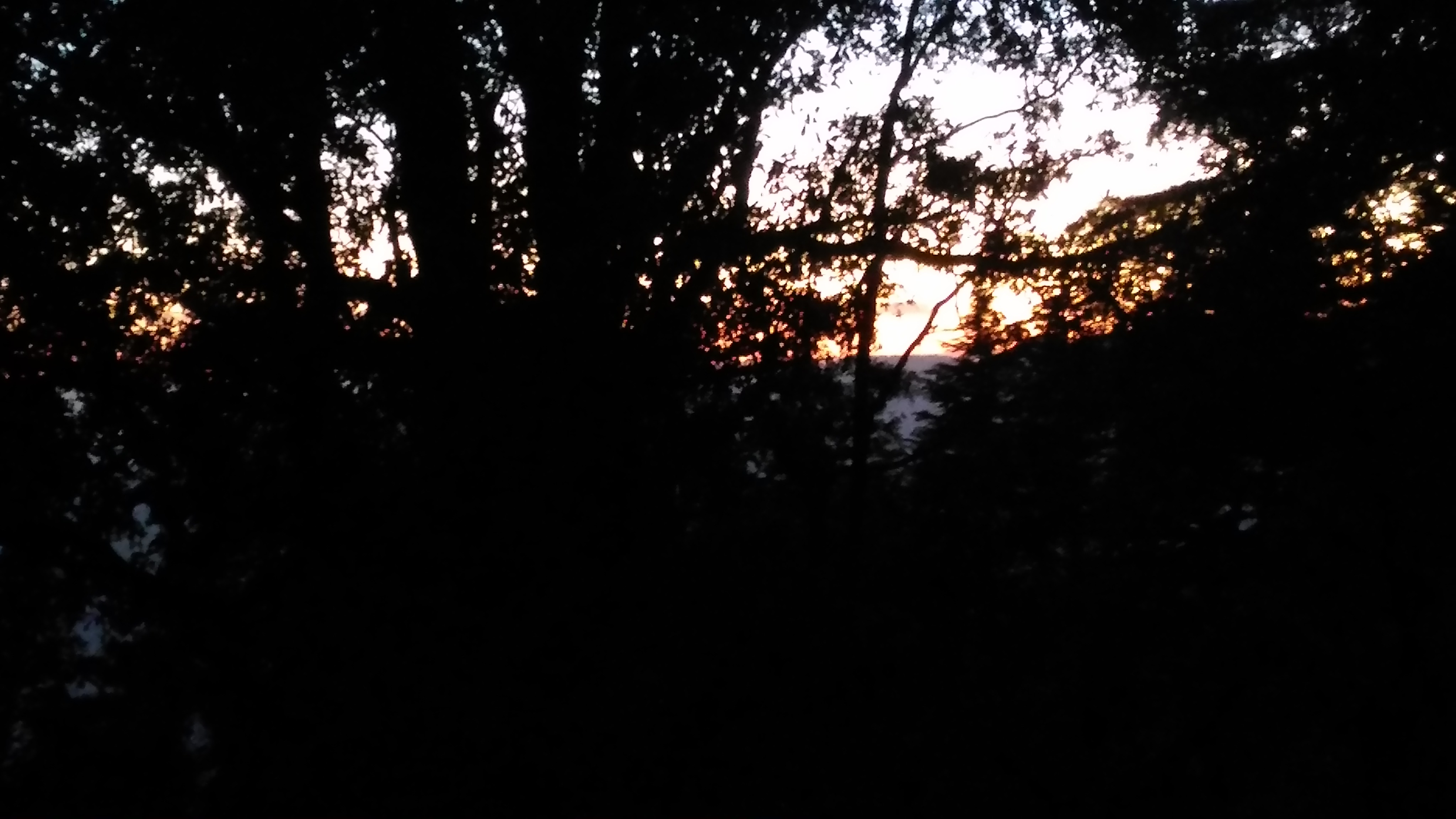
The winter-line as seen from Binsar

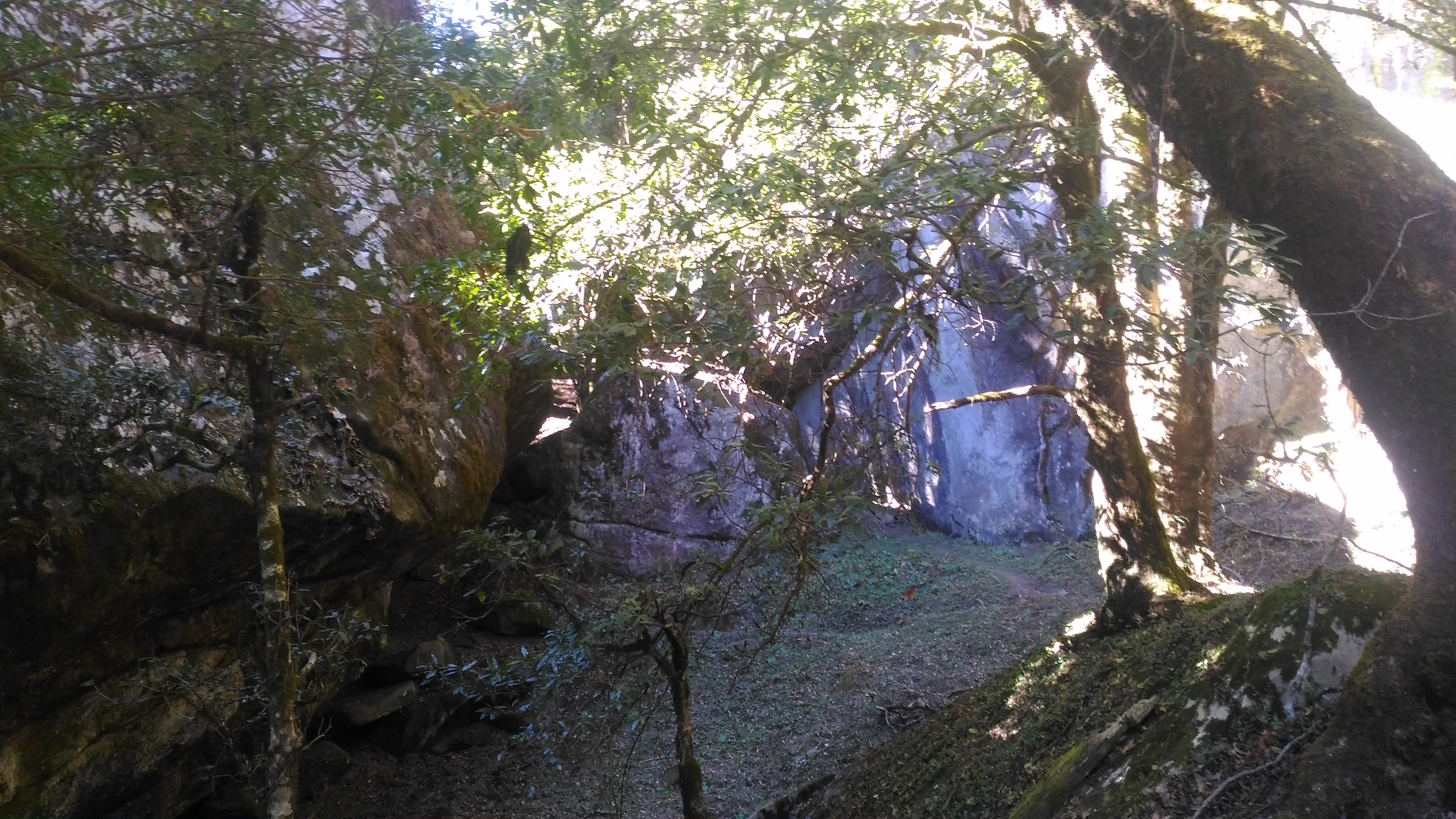
More caves near Drupal
