= Lansdowne, India =

Cantonment Town in Uttarakhand, India

Lansdowne
- Town and hill station
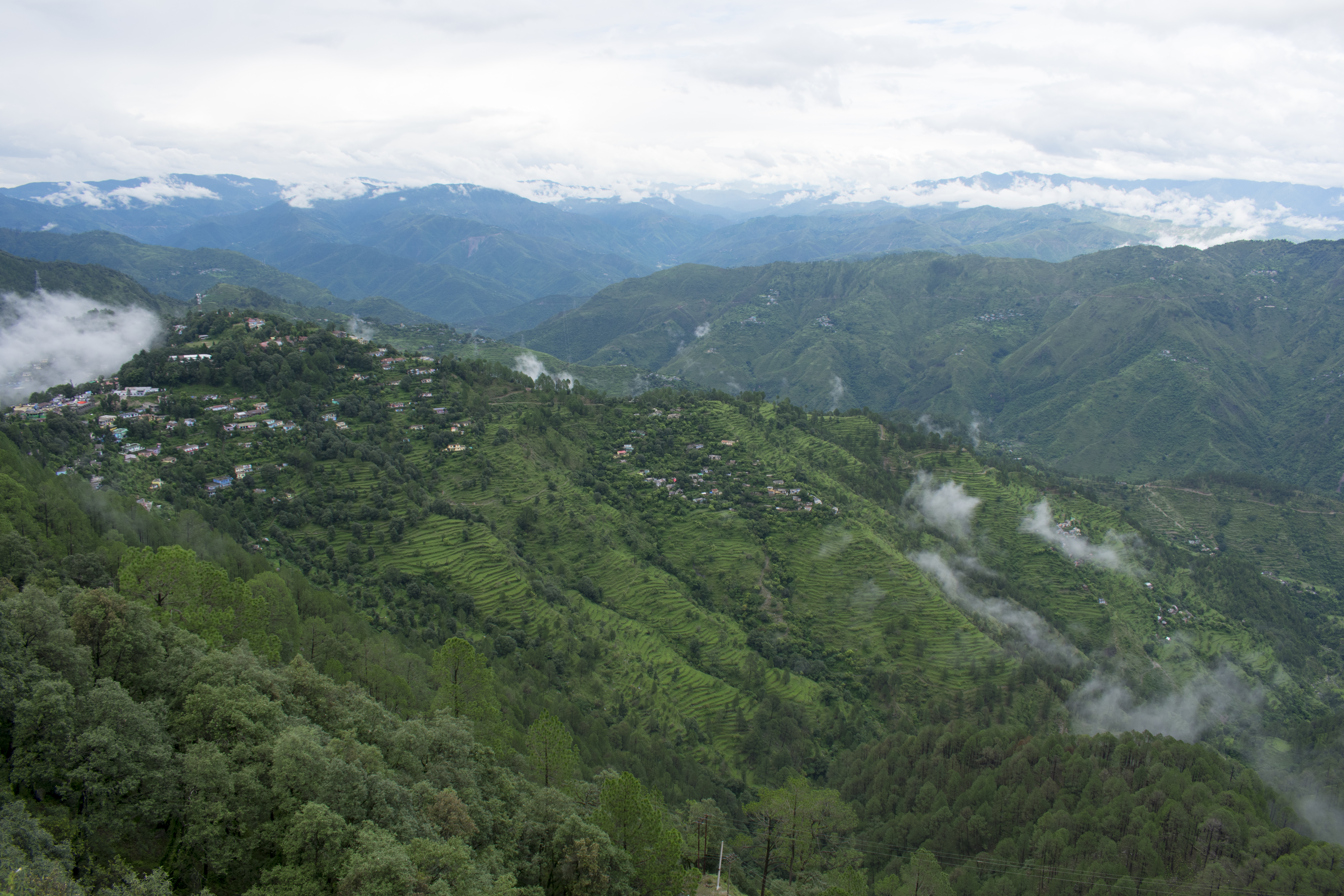
- Lansdowne
- Nickname: Kaludaand
- Location in Uttarakhand, India
- Coordinates: 29°50′15″N 78°40′55″E
- Country: India
- State: Uttarakhand
- District: Pauri Garhwal
- Established: 1887
- Named for: Lord Lansdowne

Government
  - Type: C.E.O Harshit Raj Singh
  - Body: Cantonment board

Area
  - Total: 6.09 km^{2} (2.35 sq mi)
- Elevation: 1,780 m (5,840 ft)

Population (2001)
  - Total: 7,902
  - Density: 1,300/km^{2} (3,360/sq mi)

Languages
  - Official: Hindi
- Time zone: UTC+5:30 (IST)
- Postal code: 246155
- Website: lansdowne.cantt.gov.in

Lansdowne (formerly known as Kaludanda is a cantonment town in Pauri Garhwal district of the Indian state of Uttarakhand. Situated in the Garhwal Himalayas at an elevation of approximately 1,700 metres (5,600 ft), it was established as a military cantonment in 1887 during British rule in India. The town was named after Lord Lansdowne, the then Viceroy of India, and serves as the headquarters of the Garhwal Rifles regiment of the Indian Army.

== Geography and location ==
Lansdowne is a hill station in the Pauri Garhwal district of Uttarakhand, India. It lies at an elevation of approximately 1,700 meters (5,577 feet) above sea level. The town is about 45 kilometers (28 miles) from the district headquarters, Pauri, and approximately 250 kilometers (155 miles) from the state Winter capital, Dehradun.

Lansdowne in monsoon

== History ==
Originally known as Kaludanda (Garhwali: काळूडाण्डा) after Kalu (Black) and Danda (hills) in Garhwali, Lansdowne was founded and named after then Viceroy of India (1888-1894), Lord Lansdowne in 1887, and by 1901 it had a population of 3943. Lansdowne was developed by the British for catering for the Recruits Training center of the Garhwal Rifles. Lansdowne was a major place of the activities of freedom fighters from British Garhwal during the British Raj. Nowadays, the Garhwal Rifles of the Indian Army has its regimental center here.

On 5 November 1887, the first battalion of Garhwal Rifles migrated from Almora to Lansdowne.

== Local attractions ==
The War Memorial, at the Parade Ground of the Garhwal Rifles Center, is an attraction for the visitors. Prior permission from the military authority has to be obtained.

The Garhwal Rifles Regimental Museum, also called Darwan Singh Sanghralaya, houses artefacts from the beginning of the Regiment. Many artifacts, including photographs, arms used by regimental commanders, captured weapons, campaign history and other information are displayed. There are medals won by the soldiers that have been put on display.

== Transportation ==
The nearest railway station is in Kotdwar at a distance of 44 km away.

The nearest airport is Jolly Grant Airport, near Dehradun at a distance of 152 km via the Kotdwar-Haridwar road.

Lansdowne is 83 km from Pauri and about 250 km from Delhi.

== Demographics ==
As of 2001 India census, Lansdowne had a population of 7902. Males constitute 64% of the population and females 36%. Lansdowne has an average literacy rate of 86%, higher than the national average of 74%: male literacy is 91%, and female literacy is 79%. In Lansdowne, 9% of the population is under 6 years of age.
