= Narkanda =

- Town
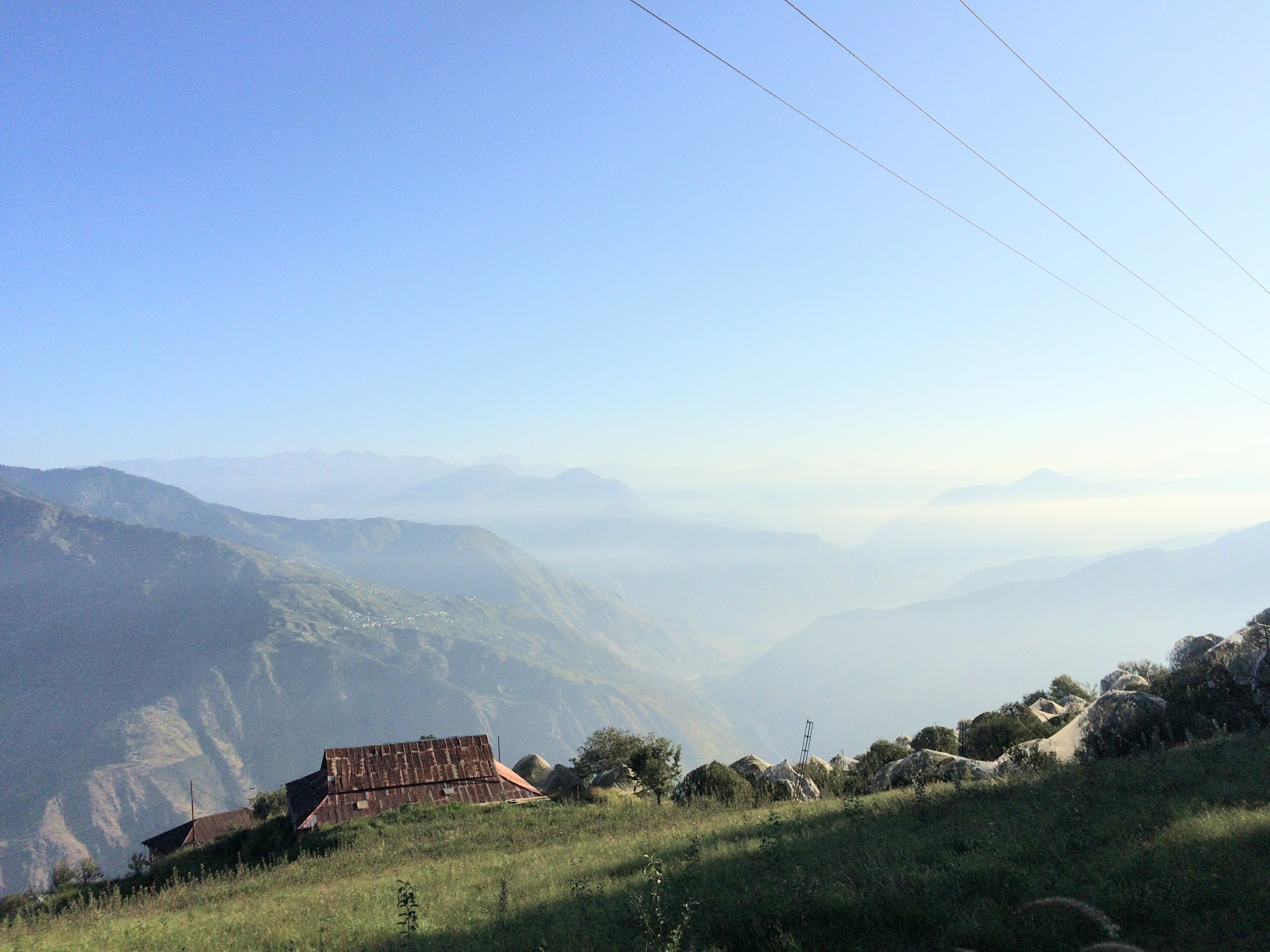
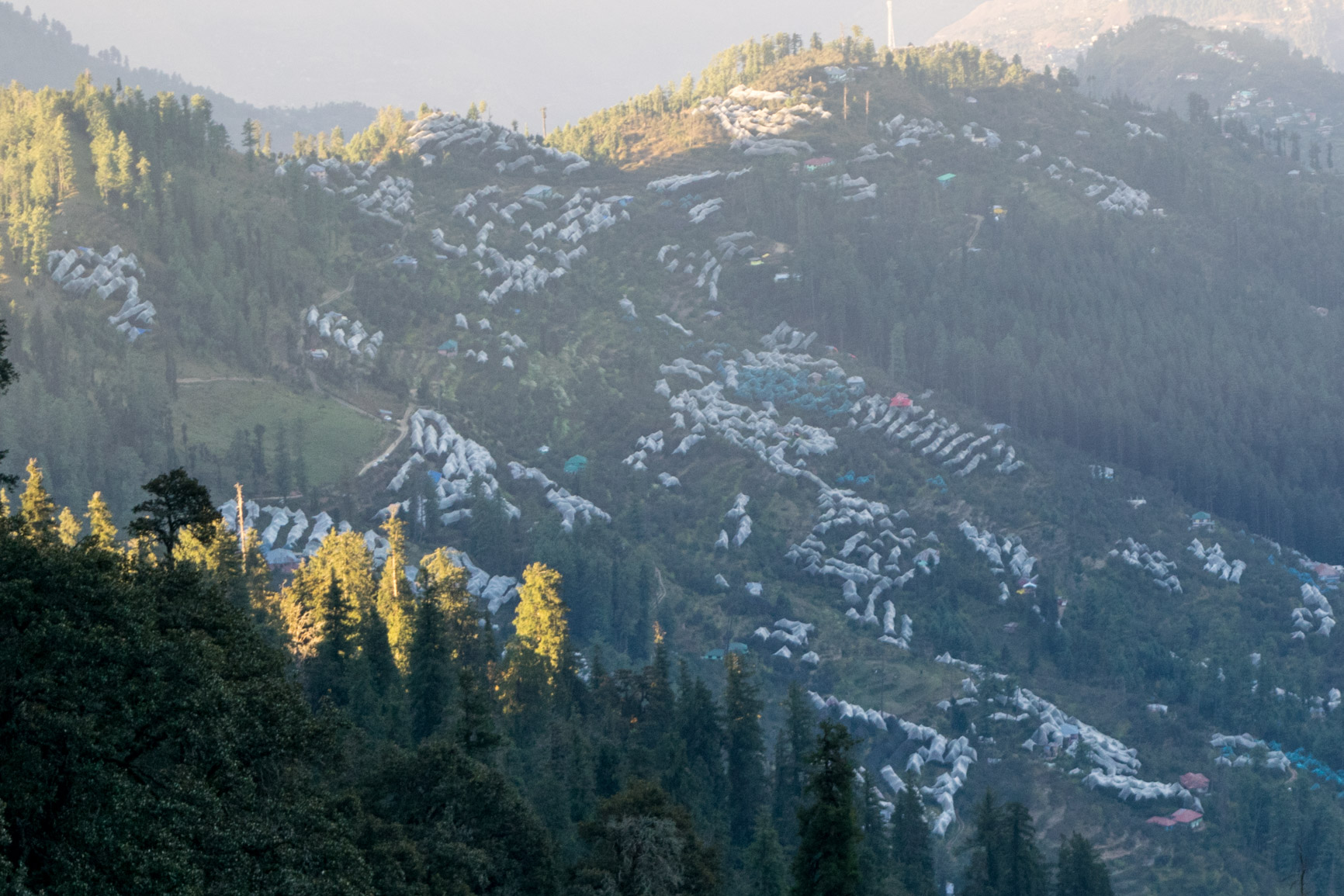
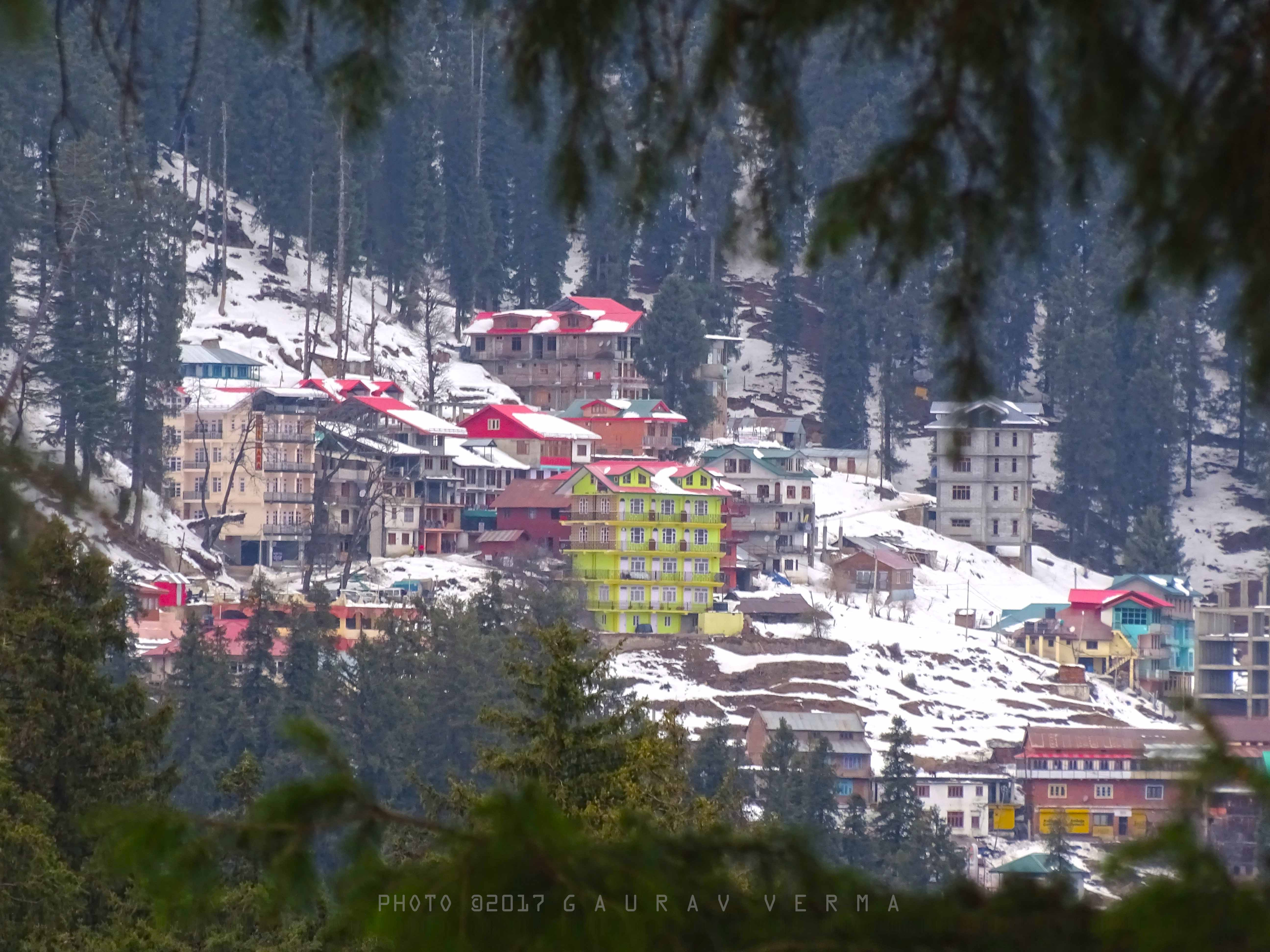
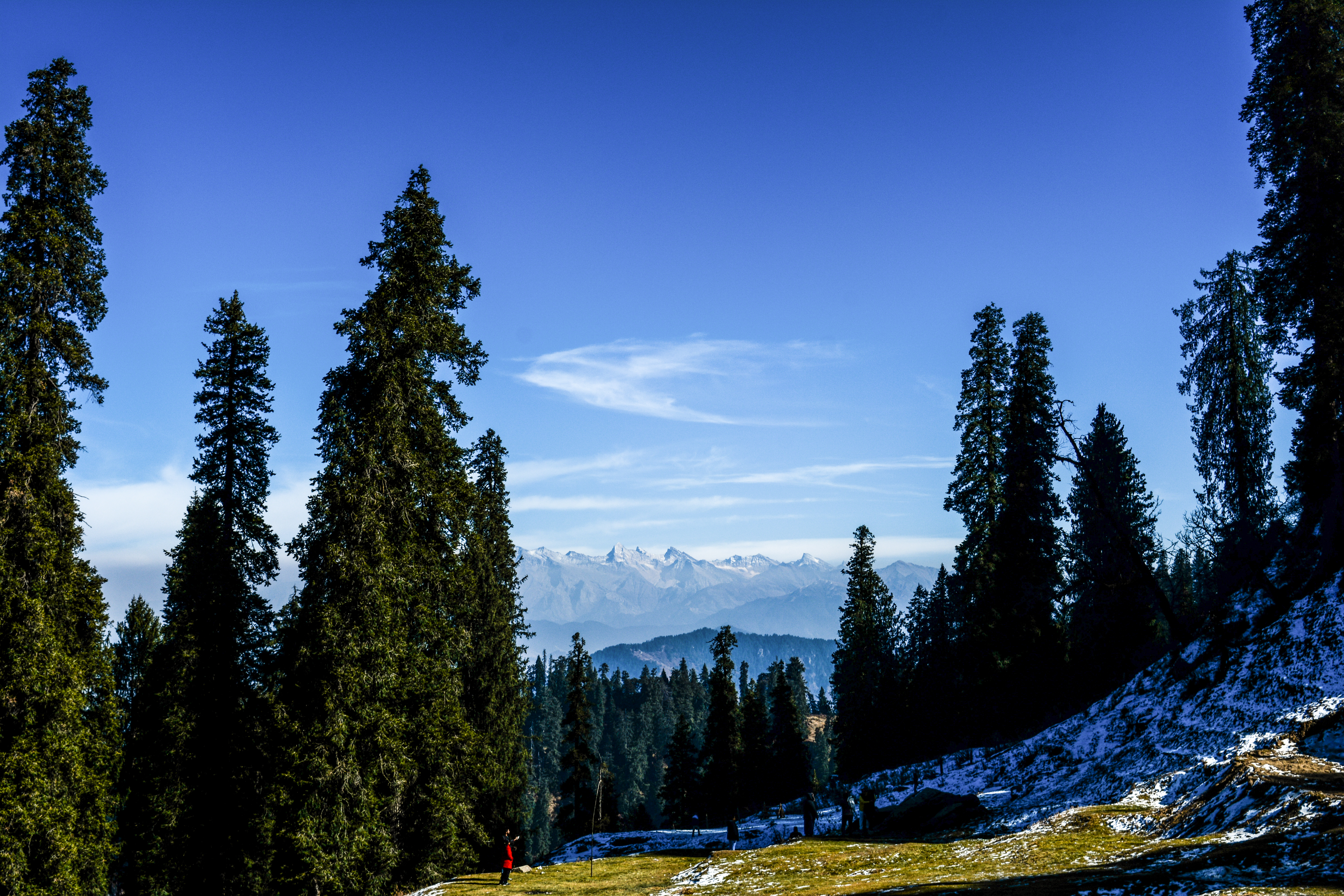
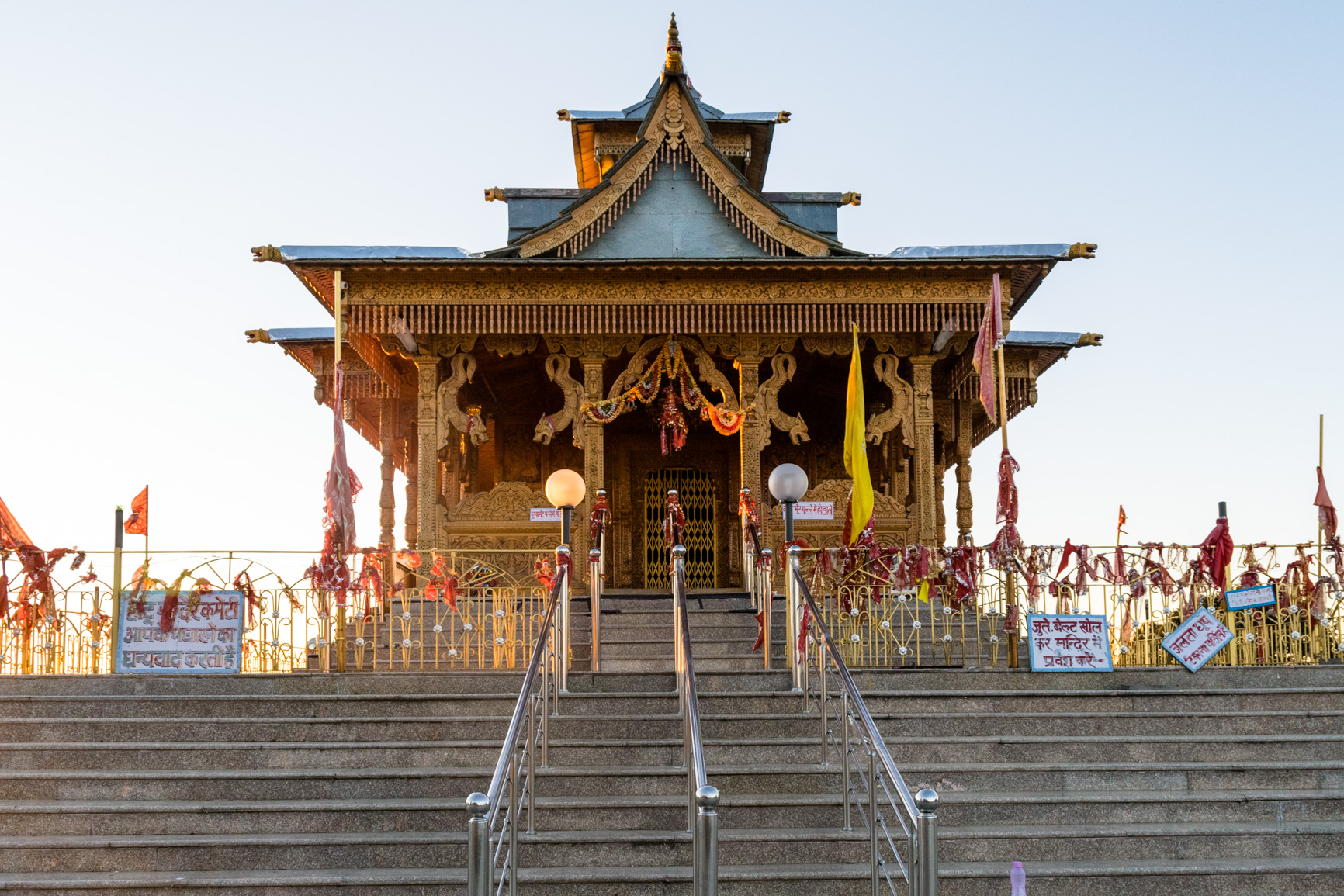
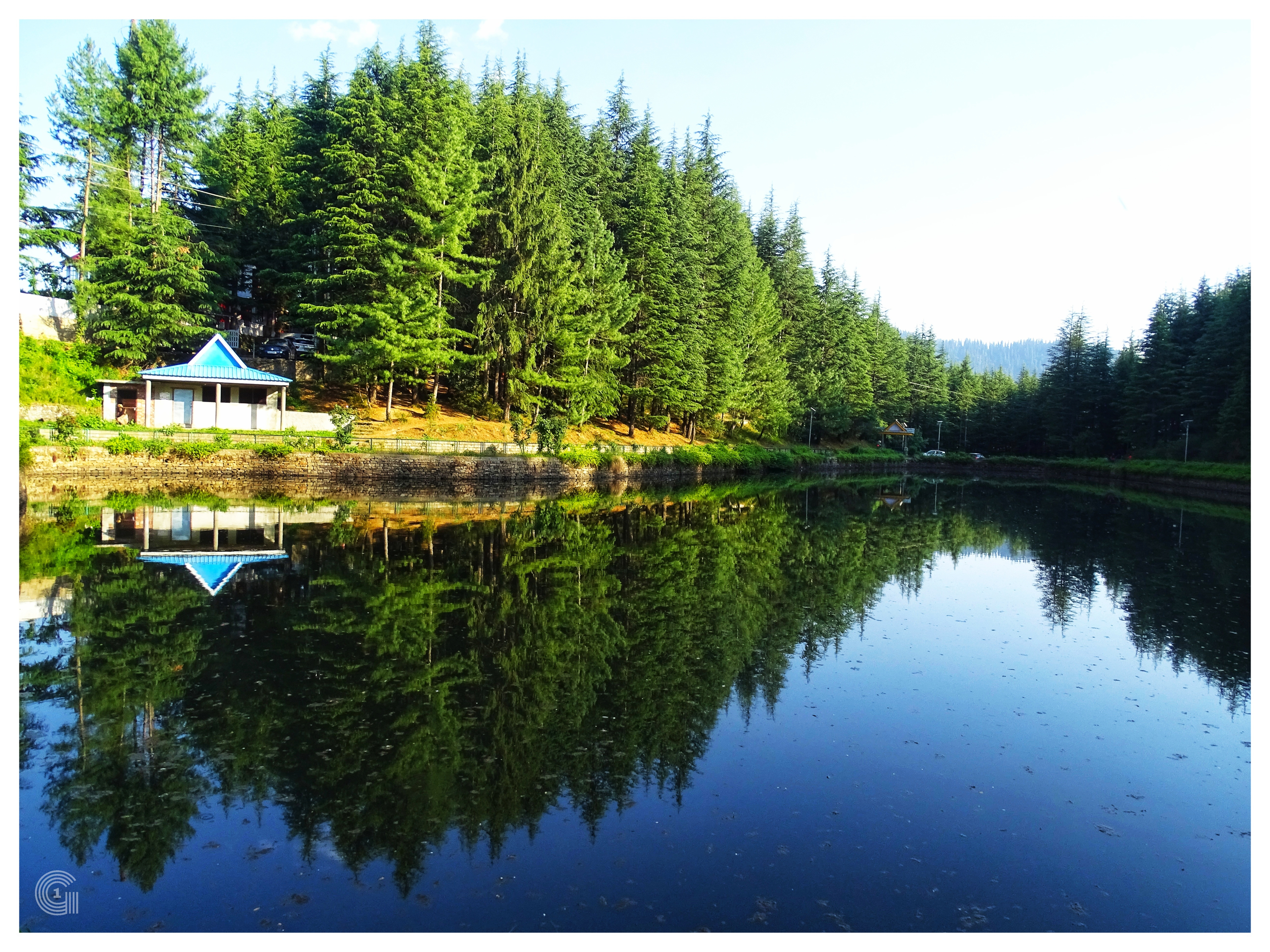
- From top, left to right: Views from Narkanda, Apple orchards as viewed from uphill, Narkanda covered in snow, Top of Hatu peak, Hatu Mata Temple, Tani Jubbar lake
- Interactive map of Narkanda
- Country: India
- State: Himachal Pradesh
- District: Shimla
- Tehsil: Kumarsain
- Elevation: 2,708 m (8,885 ft)

Population (2011)
  - Total: 901

Languages
  - Official: Hindi
  - Native: Mahasui (Shodochi)
- Time zone: UTC+5:30 (IST)
- PIN: 171213
- Vehicle registration: HP-95

Narkanda is a hill station town. It is a nagar panchayat in Kumarsain subdivision of Shimla district in the Indian state of Himachal Pradesh. It is at an elevation of 2708 meters on the Indo-Tibet Road (NH 5) in Himachal Pradesh, India within a fir (abies pindrow) forest. It is about 60 km away from Shimla and surrounded by the Himalayan Range.

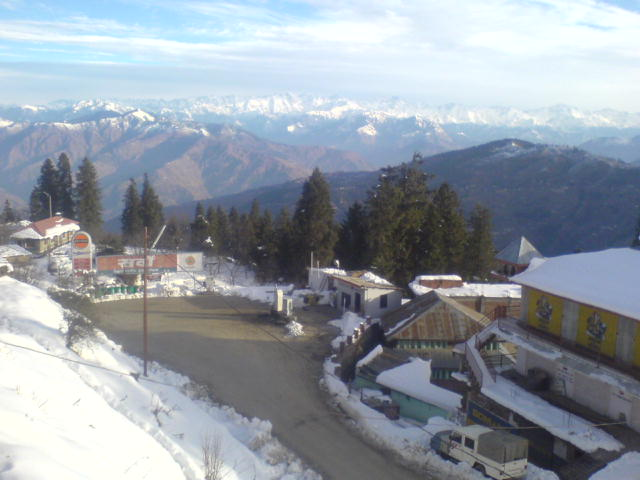
Refuelling station in Narkanda

It is a skiing resort in winter. It connects Shimla with Kumarsain and Rampur and a detour also goes to Kotgarh-Thanedhar, the prime apple belt of Himachal Pradesh where Satyananda Stokes started the apple culture.

== Geography ==
Narkanda is located at 31.27°N 77.45°E. It has an average elevation of 2708 metres (8599 feet). The famous Hatu peak is 8 km from Narkanda. Kumarsain, which is 20 km from Narkanda, is the nearest town and Narkanda comes under Kumarsain subdivision and tehsil. Kotgarh is 15 km from Narkanda and known for apple orchards. Satyanand Stokes brought the apple to this place and helped strengthen the economy of this area. Today Rs 3,000 Crore direct and indirect income is generated through apple production. Presently apple growers are shifting to bring their farm under cherry cultivation to fetch fast money in their pocket as holdings are marginalised d noue to population factor. The grandson of Mr. Stokes is experimenting to develop new variety of apple for better production.

== Climate ==
This town experiences a pleasant weather throughout the year. During the summer time from April to June, the maximum temperature is around 20°C while the minimum temperature is 10°C. While the months of July to September, Narkanda experiences the monsoon season, the months of November till March are the months when this town is covered in the sheets of snow. The maximum temperature during this time are 7-8°C and can drop till - 5to-10°C during the nights .

== Flora ==
The area is dominated by a large temperate forest mostly consist of Conifer, Oak, Maple, Populus, Aesculus, Corylus, Holly species. Tree species include:

- Conifer: There are several species of conifers growing in the area which cover the substantial part of the forest. These include: Abies pindrow, Cedrus deodara, Cryptomeria japonica, Picea smithiana, Pinus wallichiana and Taxus contorta.
- Oak: Quercus semecarpifolia and Quercus floribunda are native to the area.
- Maple: Acer caesium and Acer acuminatum are native to the area.
- Poplar: Populus ciliata is native to the area.
- Aesculus: Aesculus indica is native to the area.
- Hazelnut: Corylus jacquemontii is native to the area.
- Holly: Ilex dipyrena is native to the area.

Apart from these trees, there are various species shrubs like Berberis aristata and flower plants growing in the area. Recently, the forest has been cleared for the apple orchards.

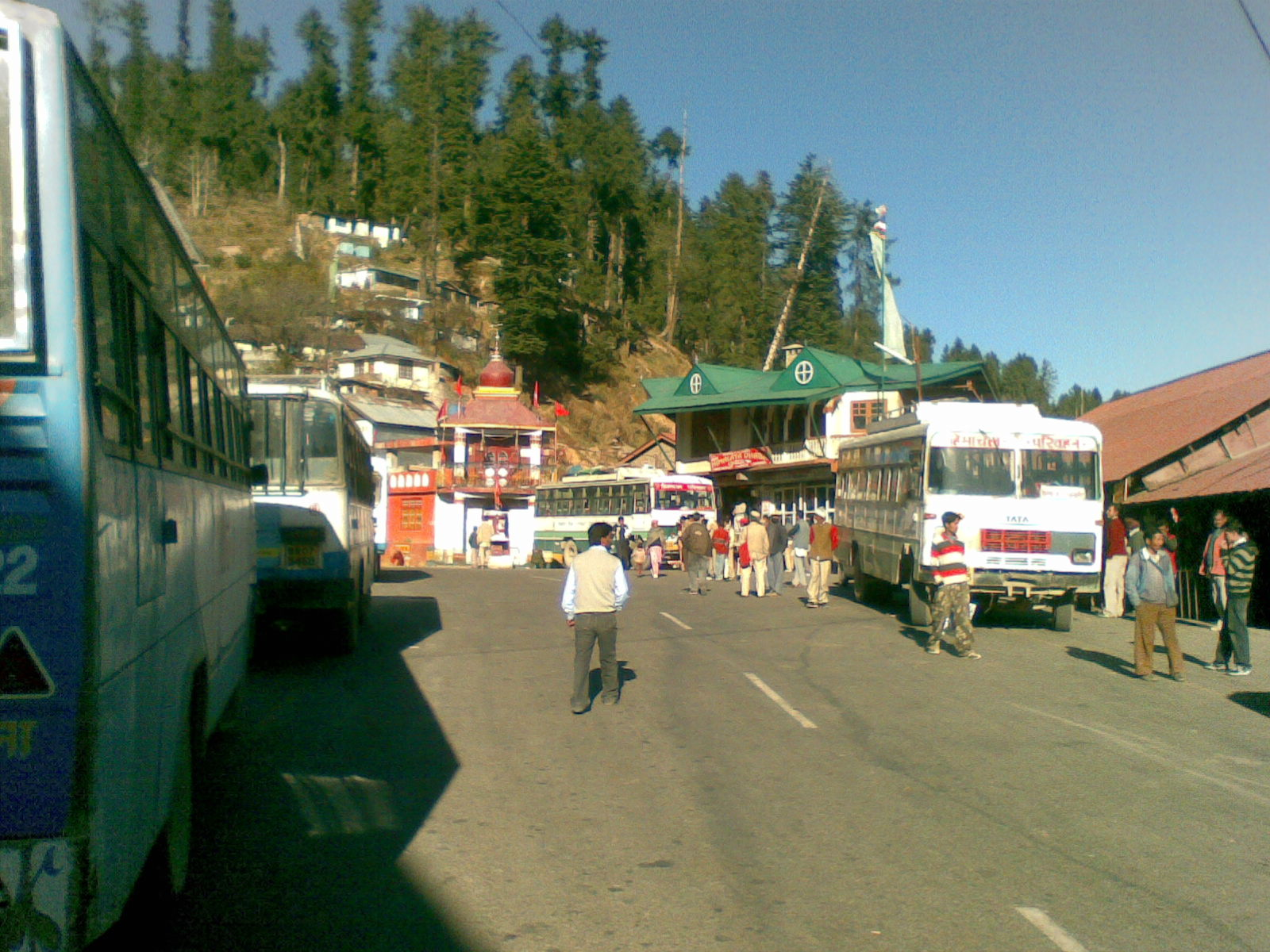
Narkanda town today

== Demographics ==
As of 2010 India census, Narkanda had a population of 2712. Males constitute 62% of the population and females 38%. Narkanda has an average literacy rate of 80%, higher than the national average of 59.5%: male literacy is 85%, and female literacy is 72%. In Narkanda, 15% of the population is under 6 years of age. The native language here is Pahari but Hindi and English are also spoken.

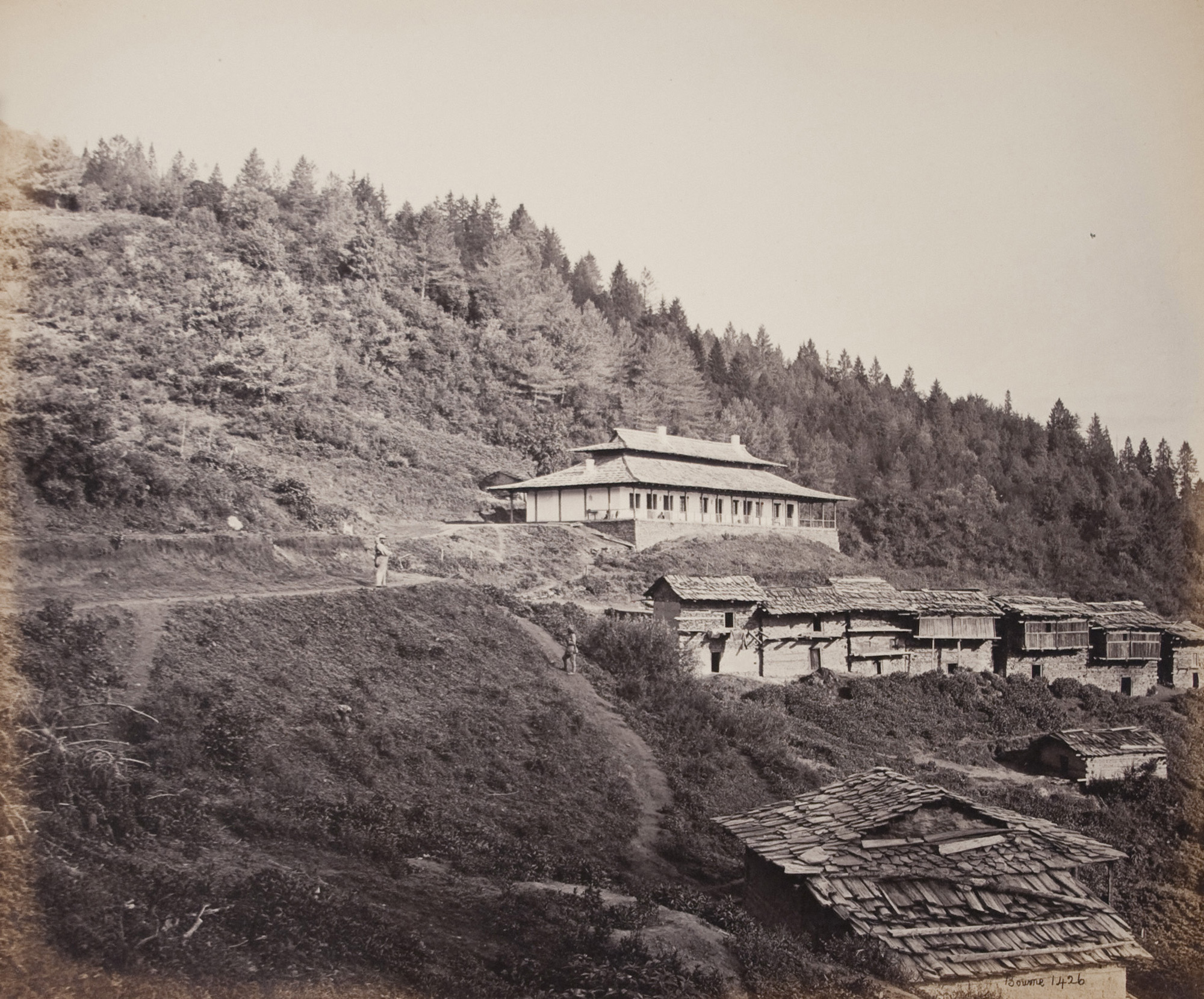
The dak bungalow at Narkanda in 1886

== See also ==
- Reo Purgyil
