= Thalisain =

- Town
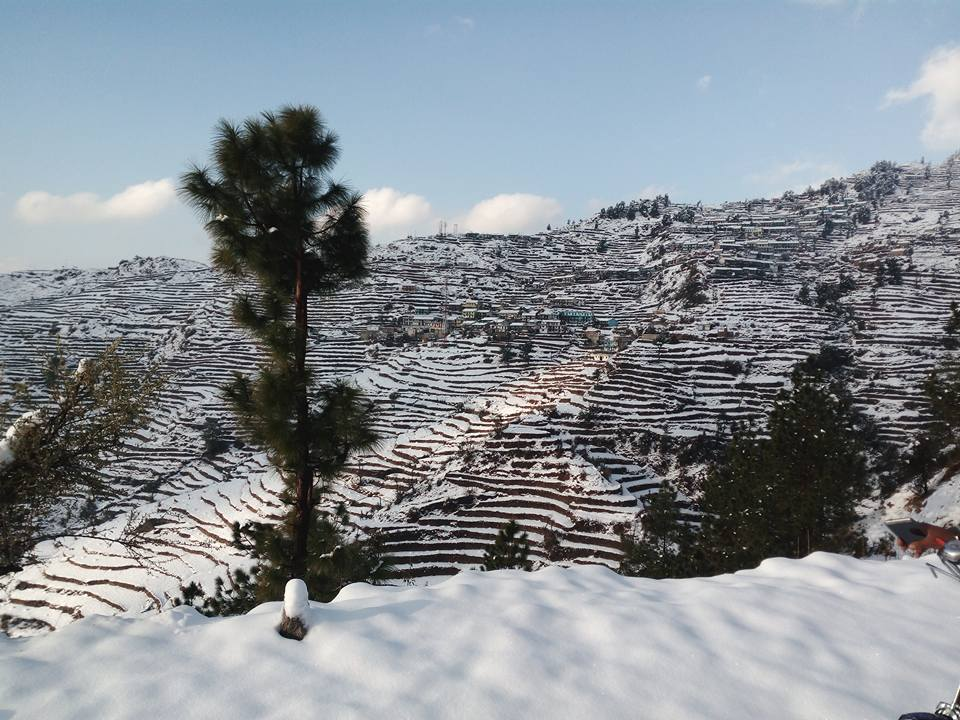

- Location in Uttarakhand, India
- Coordinates: 30.02°N 79.04°E
- Country: India
- State: Uttarakhand
- District: Pauri Garhwal
- Elevation: 1,690 m (5,540 ft)

Population (2011)
  - Total: 2,900

Languages
  - Official: Hindi
  - Native: Garhwali
- Time zone: UTC+5:30 (IST)
- PIN: 246285
- Telephone code: +91 - 1348
- Vehicle registration: UK-12
- Website: pauri.nic.in

Thalisain is a town and tehsil of Pauri Garhwal district in the North Indian state of Uttarakhand. At an elevation of 1690 metres from sea level, it is situated on a gentle slope above the right bank of Nayaar (East) river. It is in the southwestern foothills of Dudhatoli Range and at a distance of 83 kilometers from Pauri town (headquarters of Pauri Garhwal district) and 95 kilometers from Gairsain, the future capital of Uttarakhand.

== Etymology ==
Originally, the name of the place was Thali (some locals still call it by this name), but since the town is settled on a long and gentle hill (known as “Sain” in Garhwali language) it later came to be known as Thalisain. Just like in Gairsain, “Gair” means a deep place or a valley and “Sain” means a flattish hill.

== History ==
Garhwal got its name during the 9th century AD when Kanakpal, the chieftain of Chaandpurgarhi, conquered all the little kingdoms from Uttarkashi to Garhwal-Kumaon border and unified them to form the kingdom of Garhwal with Garhwali as the official state language. Garhwal literally translates to “Land of Forts”. There were 52 of those fortresses scattered all over the land, Chaandpur being one of them. Thalisain was a part of Patti Choprakot in the historic Chaandpur kingdom, with its headquarters at Chaandpurgarhi in Chamoli Garhwal. Chaandpur kingdom administered five Pattis of Garhwal viz Choprakot, Chauthan, Dhaijyuli, Lohbha and Chaandpur (at present the first three are in Pauri District and the next two in Chamoli district, forming a part of Dudhatoli mountains).

Ruins of ancient temples of that era can still be found and a few temples are in a very good condition. From these ancient monuments, it can be ascertained that the place has been inhabited since ancient times. Although Thalisain town doesn't have any ancient monuments, but ancient temples can be found scattered around the surrounding hill-tops. Most of these stone temples have been built in traditional Ashlar style, some even showing Katyuri characteristics dating from 12th to 16th century AD. All the temples except Rahu temple in Paithani have been built in remote areas or in wilderness. Besides temples, there are a good number of old houses that can be seen in some villages. These traditional houses, known as Tibaari in Garhwali were quite popular at the time, when Garhwal dynasty was at its peak. Later on, Pauri and Chamoli became a part of British Garhwal and the kingdom of Garhwal shrank in size, almost the entire Uttarakhand was under the British. Thus began a decline of those houses and their construction flourished only in the valley of Bhagirathi, which was the last stronghold of the royal family. Today, those temples and houses tell of the glorious past of the Garhwal kingdom when there were no roads and warriors roamed the forests and bridle paths on their horses.

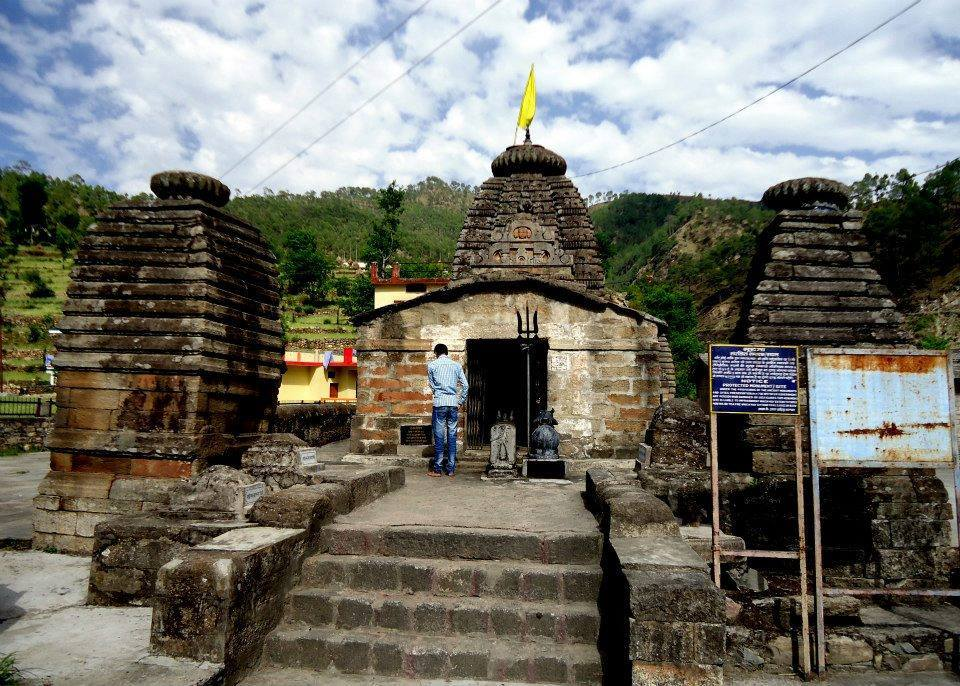
The only Rahu temple in India, 50 km from Thalisain

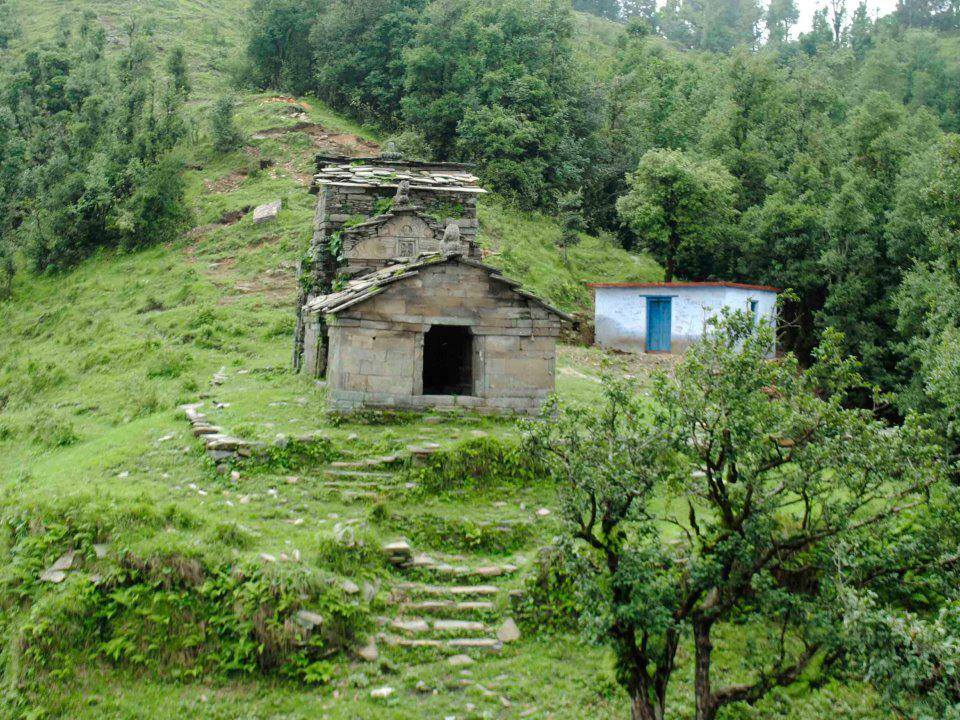
Buda Bharsaar, a temple dedicated to Ghandiyal devta

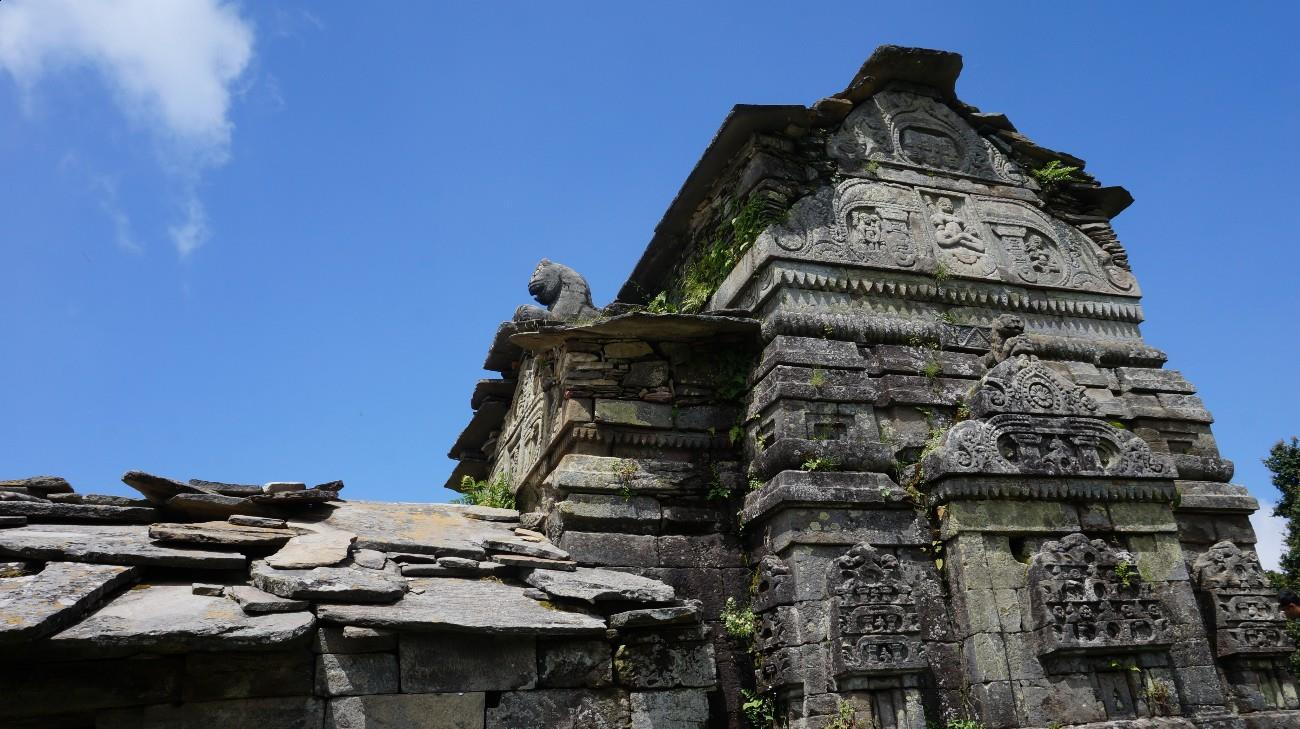
Buda Bharsaar, close-up view

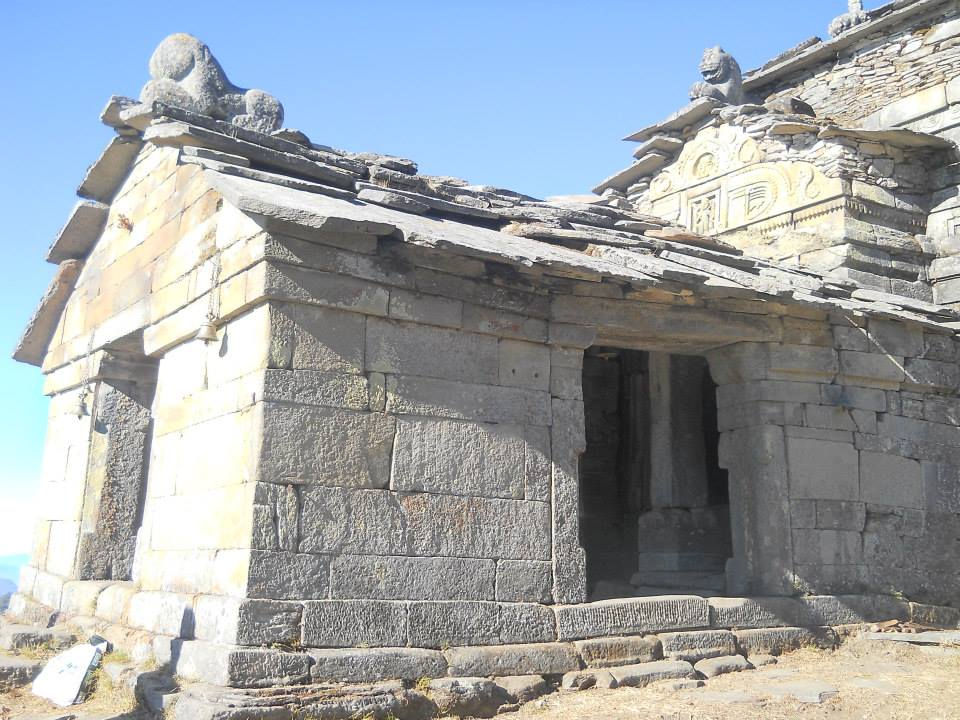
Unique architecture of Buda Bharsaar temple

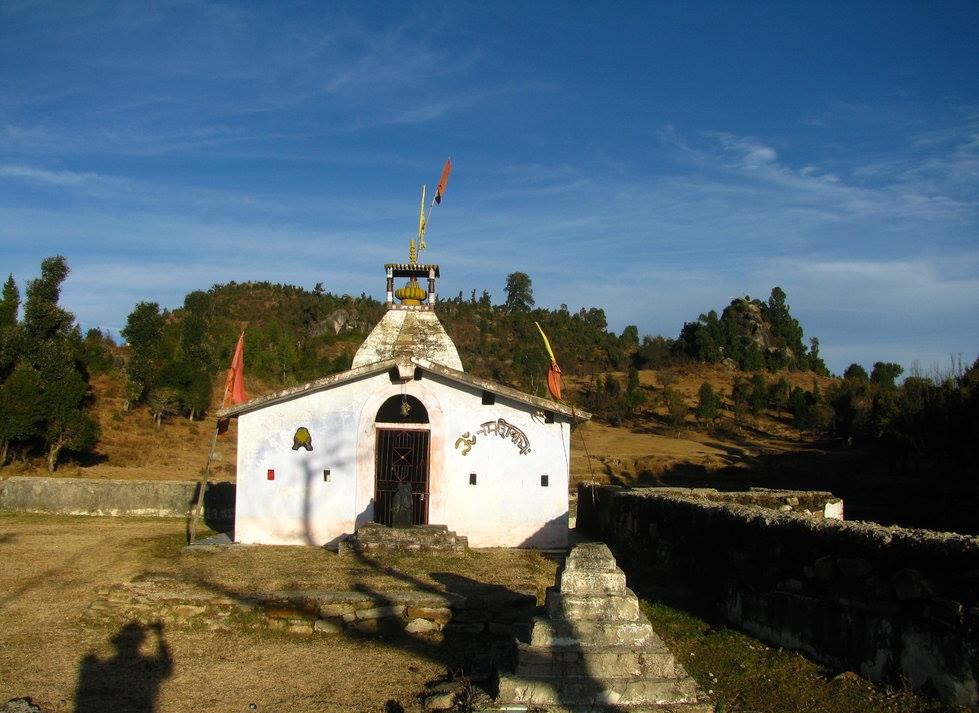
Tarakund Mahadev temple, near Badeth village

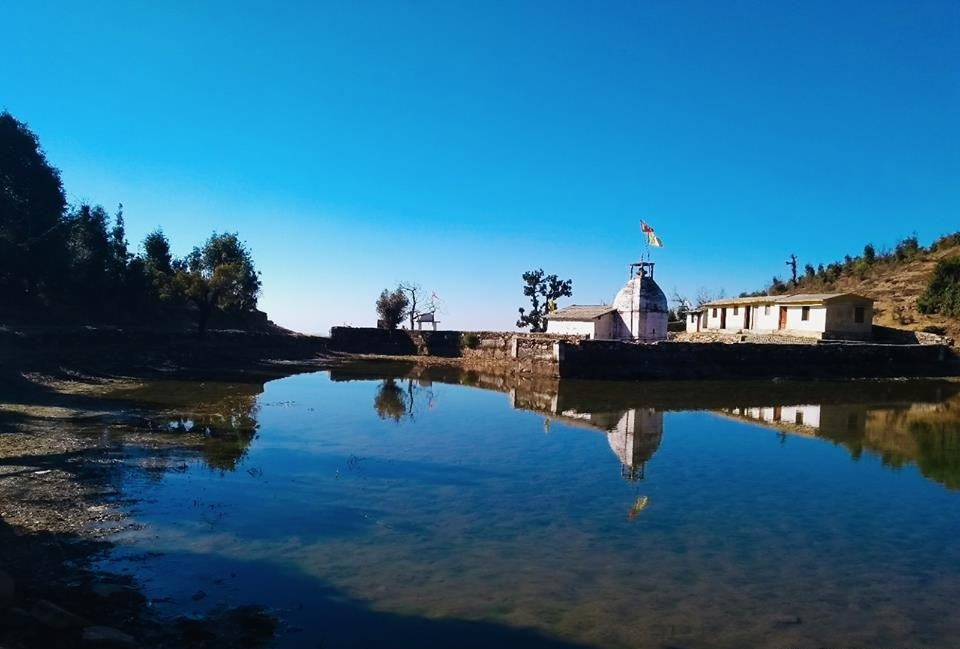
The lake after which Tarakund is named

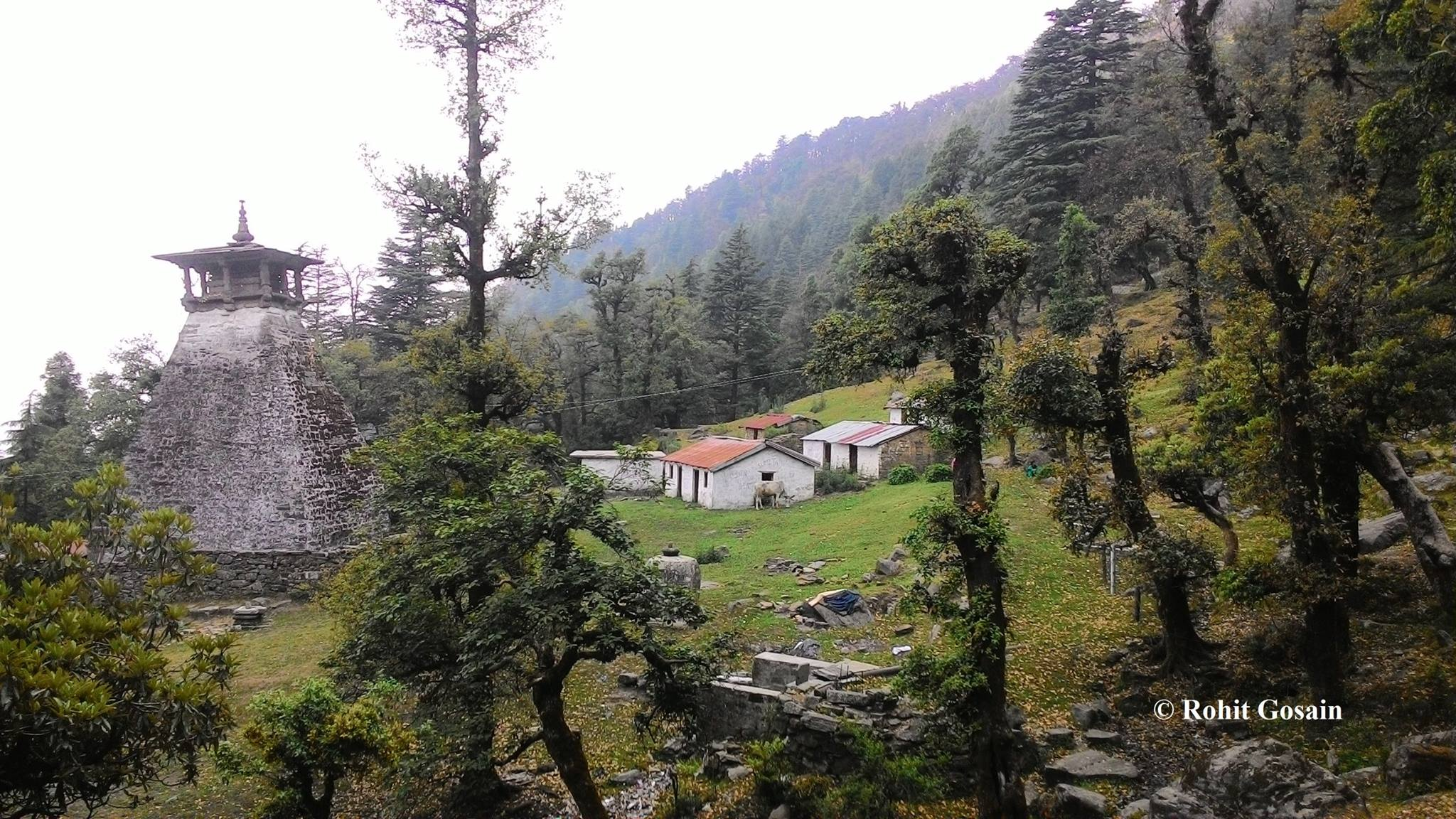
Bindeshwar or Binsar Mahadev

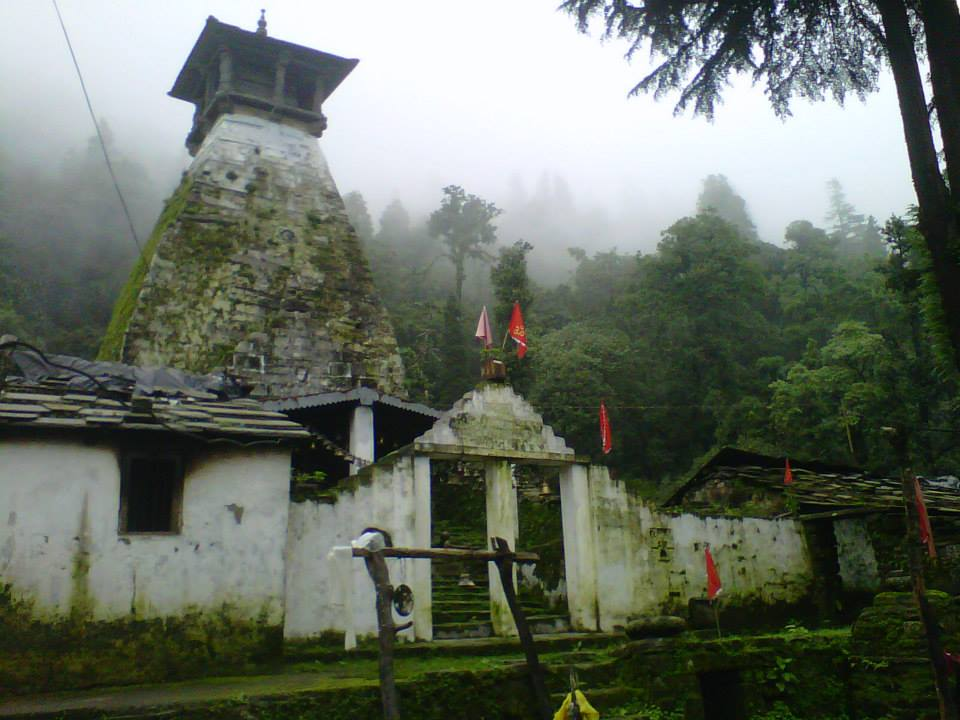
Bindeshwar Mahadev during monsoon

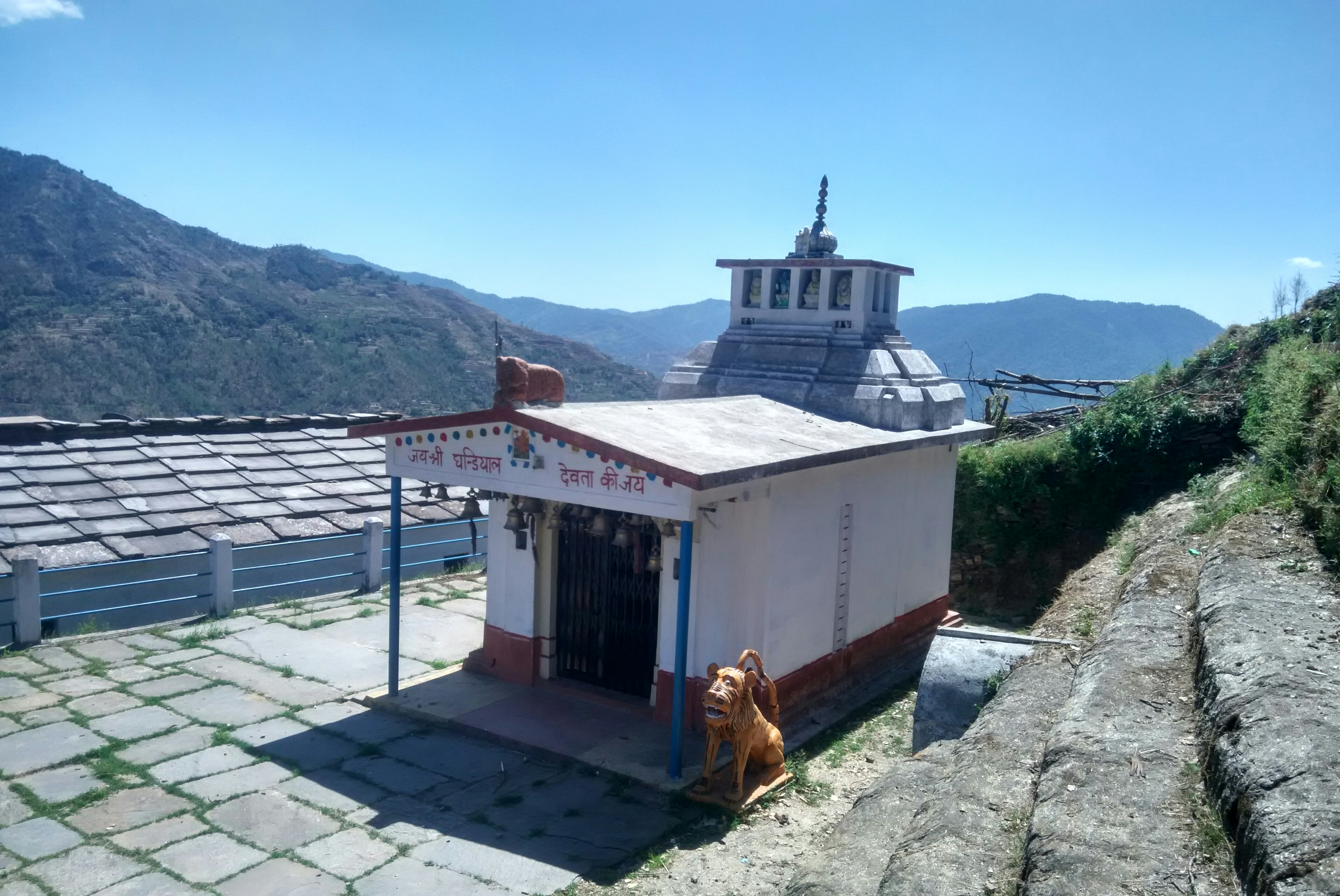
Ghandiyal devta temple, Musaiti

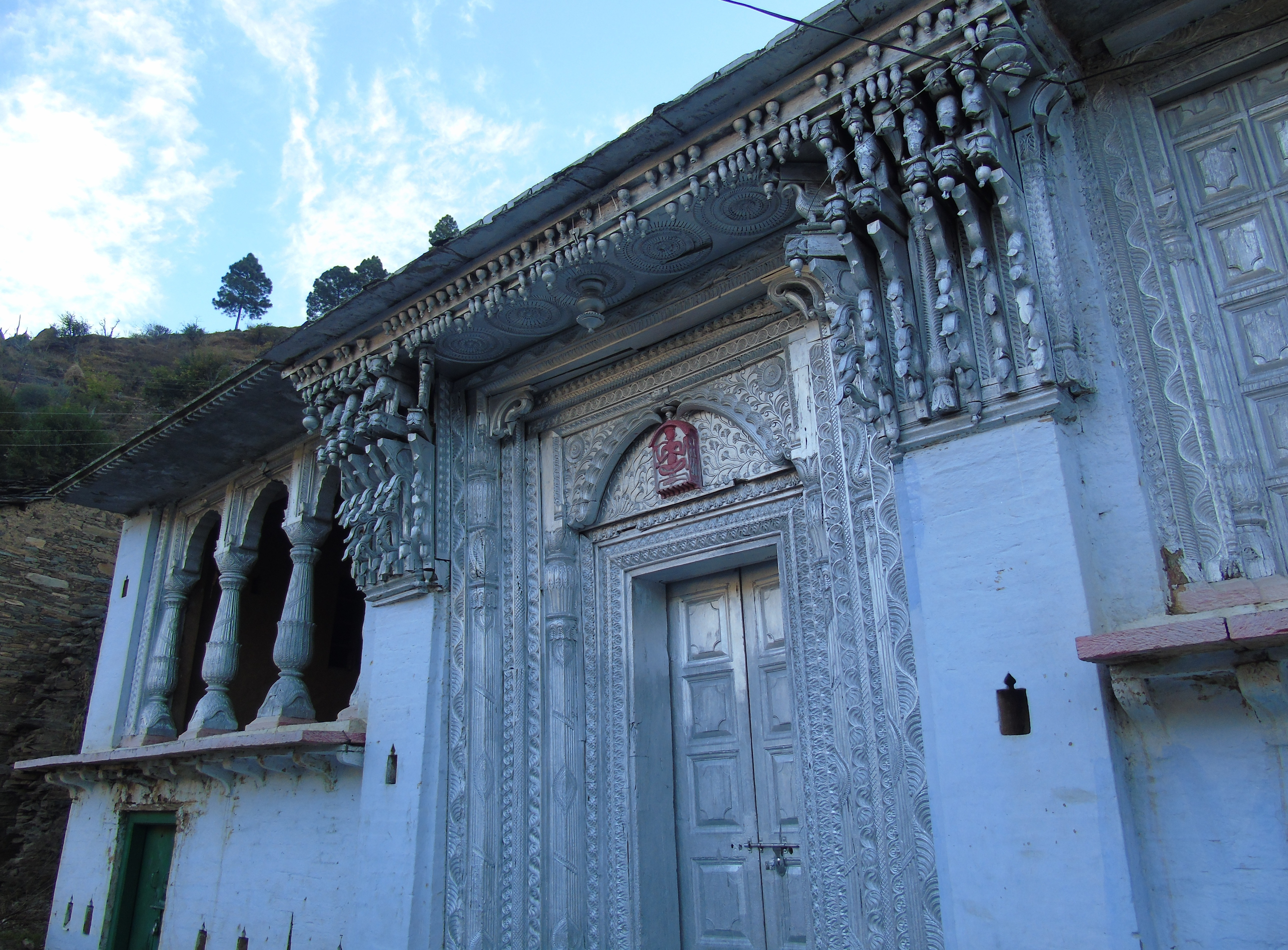
A centuries old "Tibaari" or traditional Garhwali house at Syunsi

While British administration undertook the construction of several roads, schools and medical facilities in the region, they also formulated policies to take control of the natural resources, specifically the forests, as the region had one of the densest forest covers in Garhwal hills and was conveniently close to the plains of North India. Trees were felled recklessly for timber, fuel and railway sleepers. It was during that era, when railway line was extended from Moradabad to Ramnagar in 1907. Ramnagar became the nearest railhead for the region and facilitated harvesting of forest produce.

== Geography ==
Thalisain tehsil comprises two blocks, Bironkhal block and Thalisain block. Thalisain development block extends from latitudes 29.54 N to 30.10 N and longitudes 78.54 E to 79.13 E, measuring 35 km in length and 49 km in width. Most of the Himalayan ranges extend from north-west to south-east direction. The south-eastern face is most favorable site for the location of settlements. Because of the sunny aspect, compact settlements are located on the spurs and river terraces. The south- eastern faces are denser than northern and western aspects. North western aspects are not favorable for human habitation and agricultural occupations because it receives less solar energy.

== Climate ==
The climate is influenced by the elevation and relative position of the land. The overall climate of the region is temperate. The valley area experiences pleasantly warm climate, hence dense population is found in the valleys. Mid slope and mountain ranges have a temperate climate hence semi-compact and scattered settlements are found here. Above 2000m, there are temporary seasonal settlements which are generally distributed on the forest land. Aspects play a significant role in the selection of settlement sites in the Himalayan Mountain. Temperature ranges between 15 and 30 degrees Celsius in summer and -5 to 15 degrees Celsius in winter. The region receives a significant amount of rain in monsoon season as well as snow from December to March.

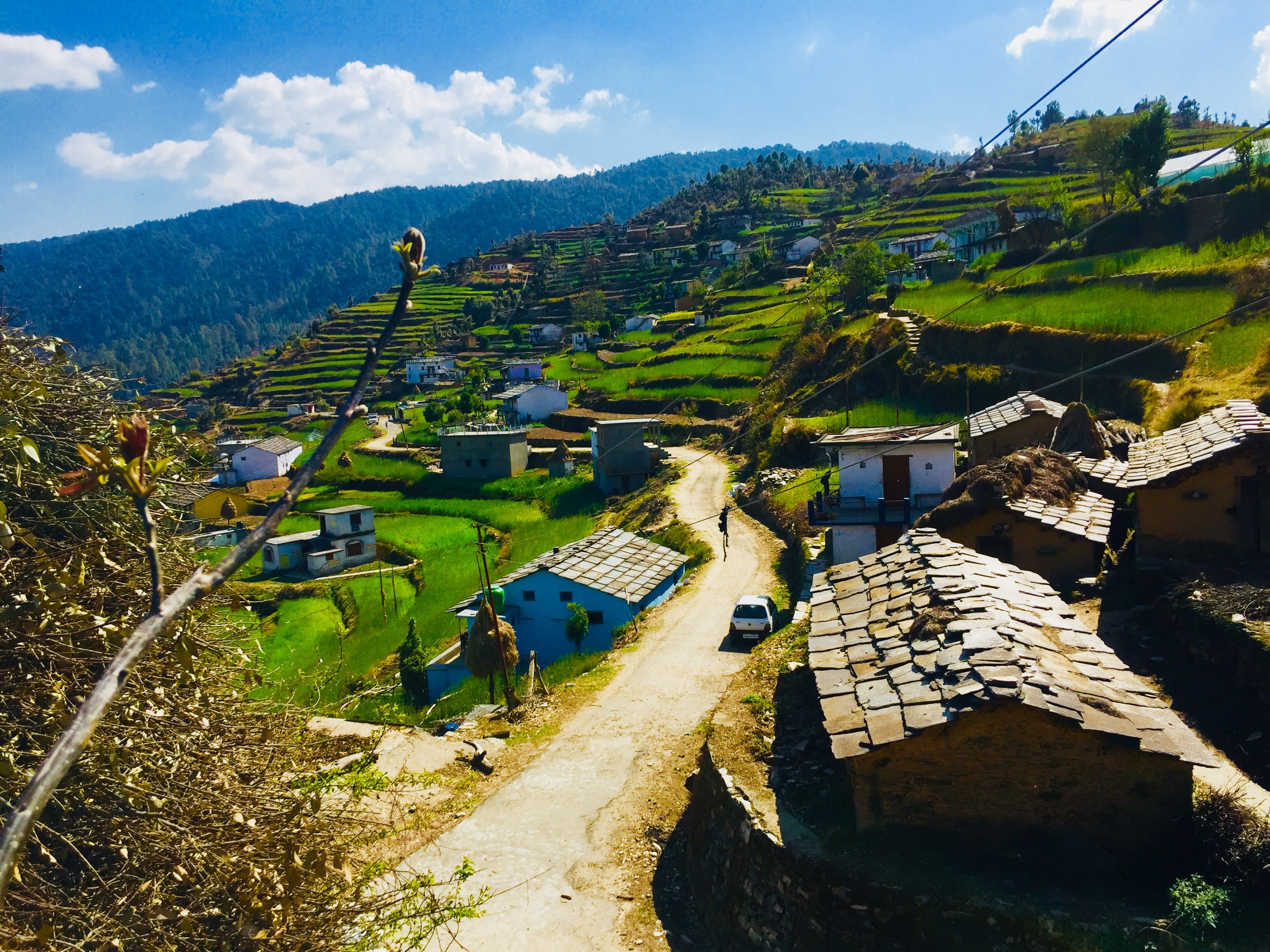
Somewhere around Thalisain in early spring

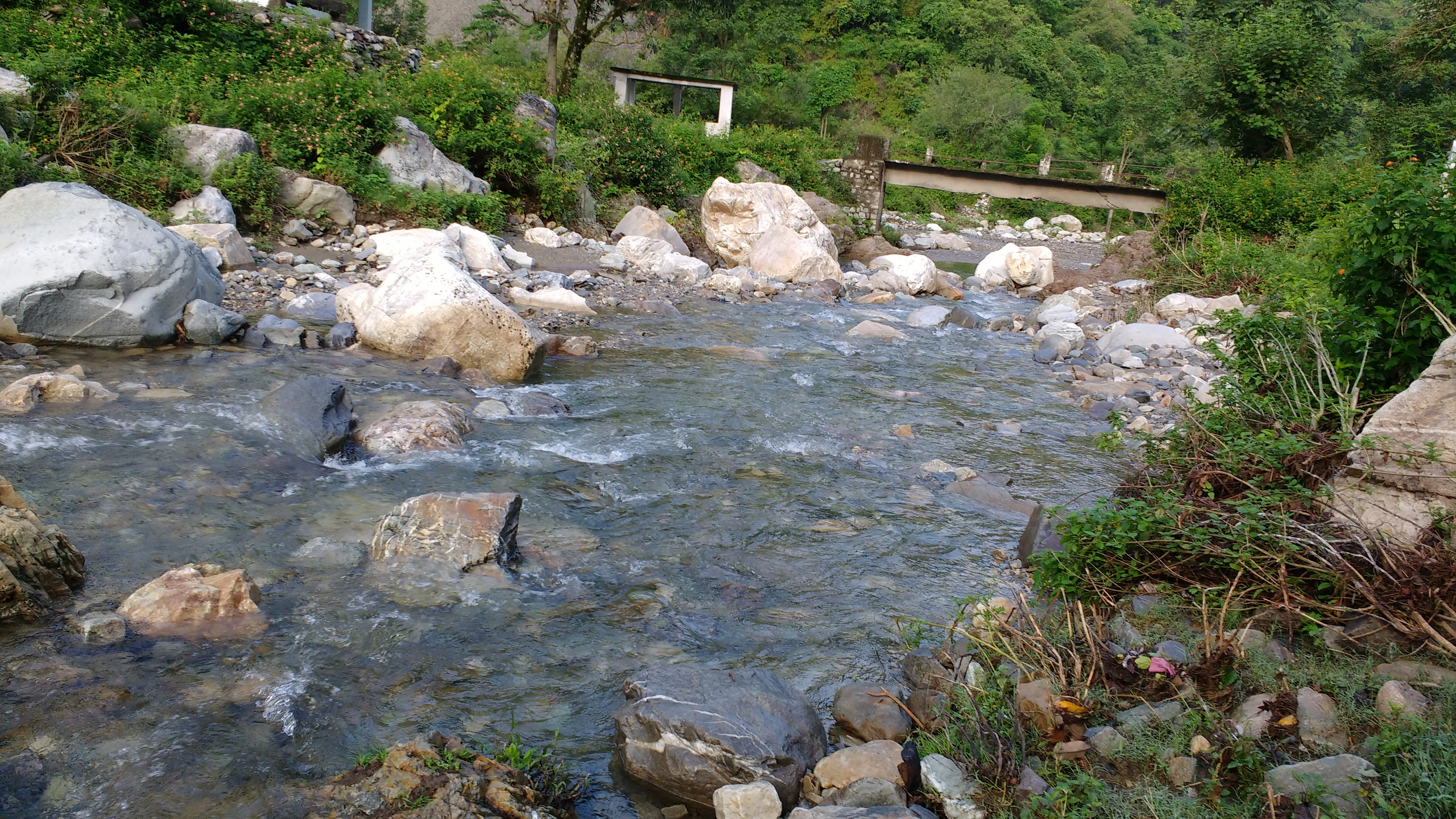
A babbling brook

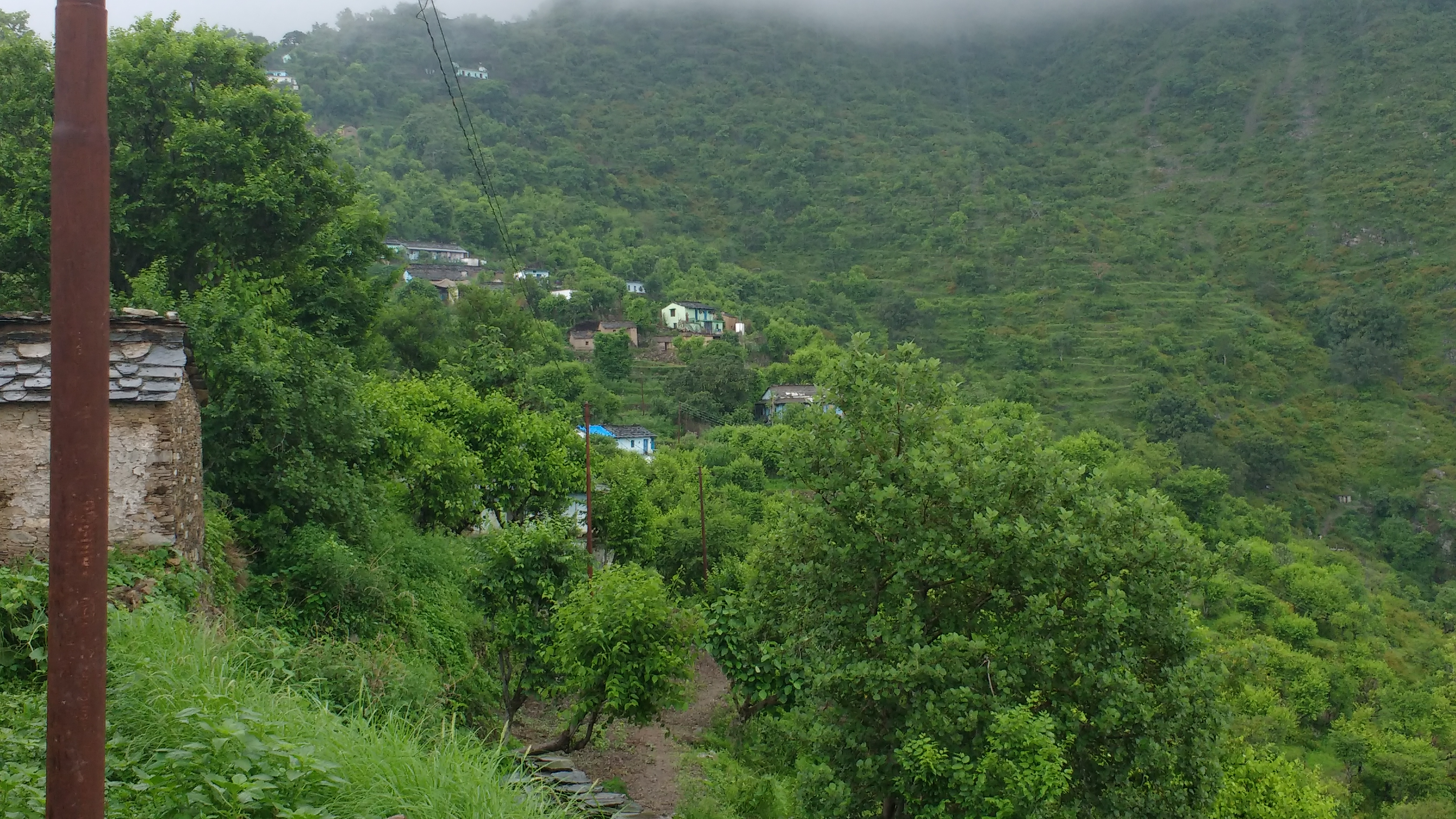
Lush greenery of monsoon

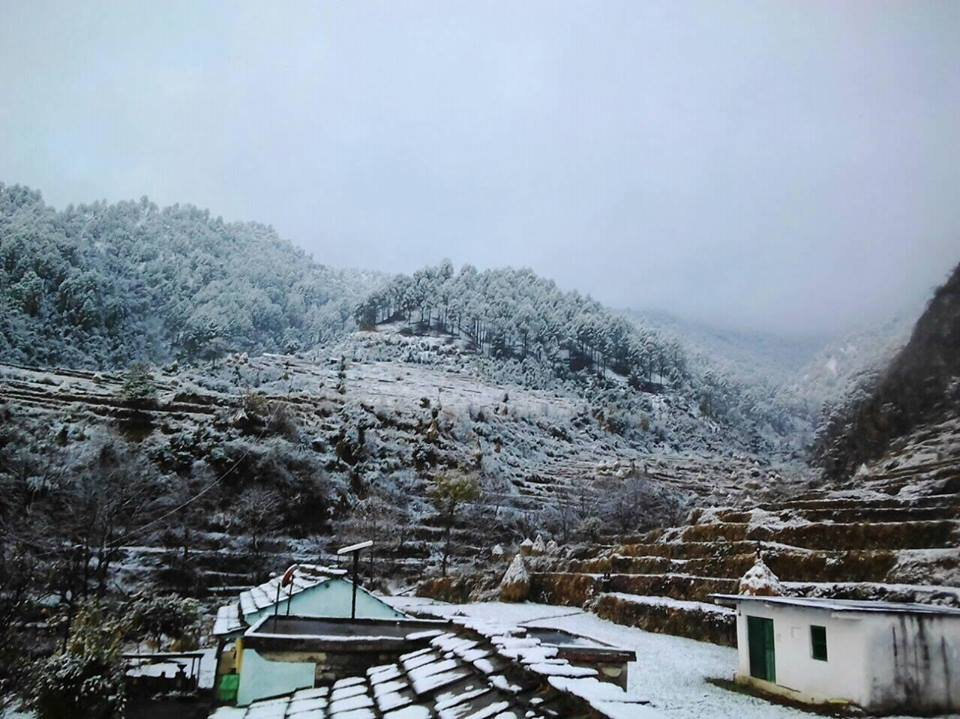
Snowfall in Nayaar river valley

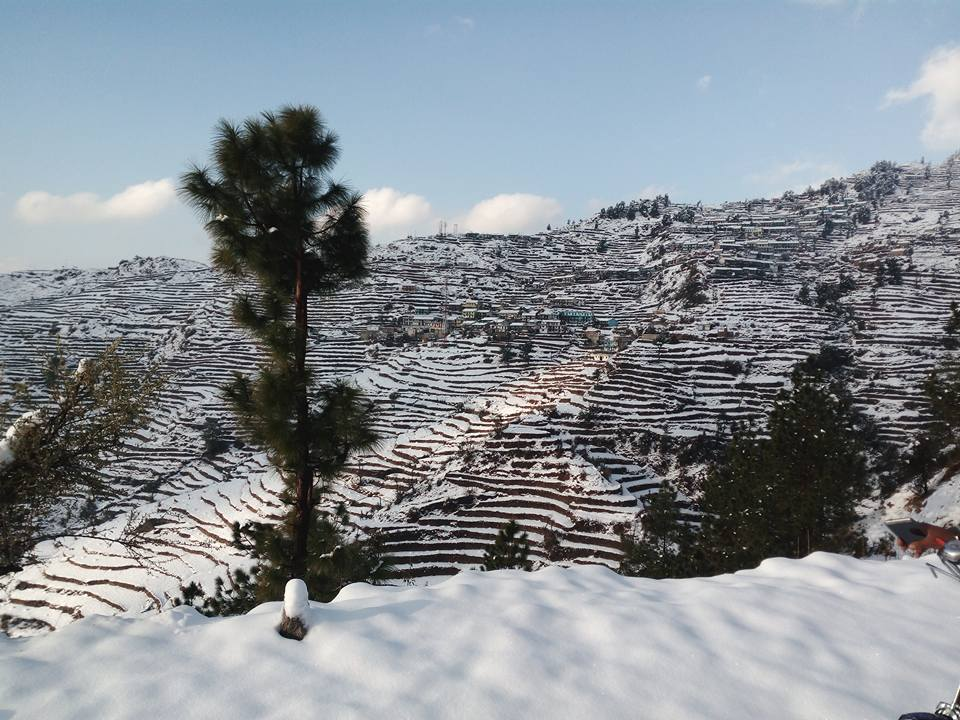
Snowfall at Kaproli, near Thalisain

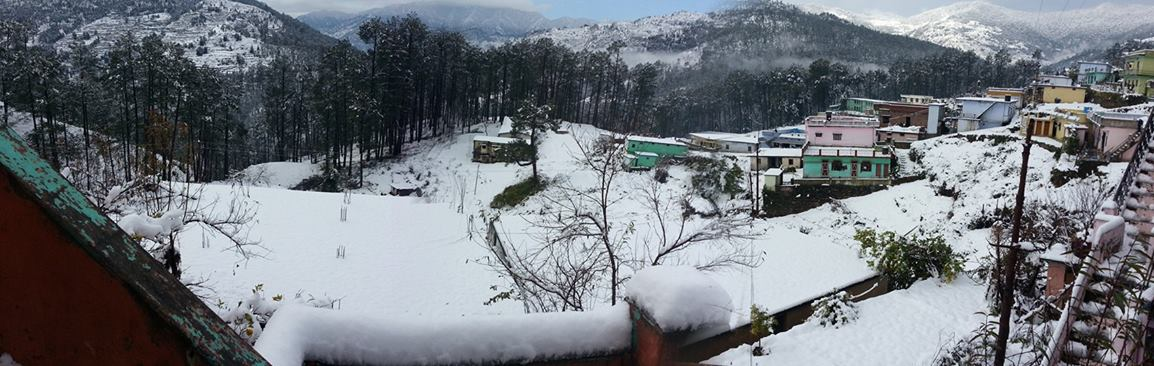
Snowfall at Thalisain town

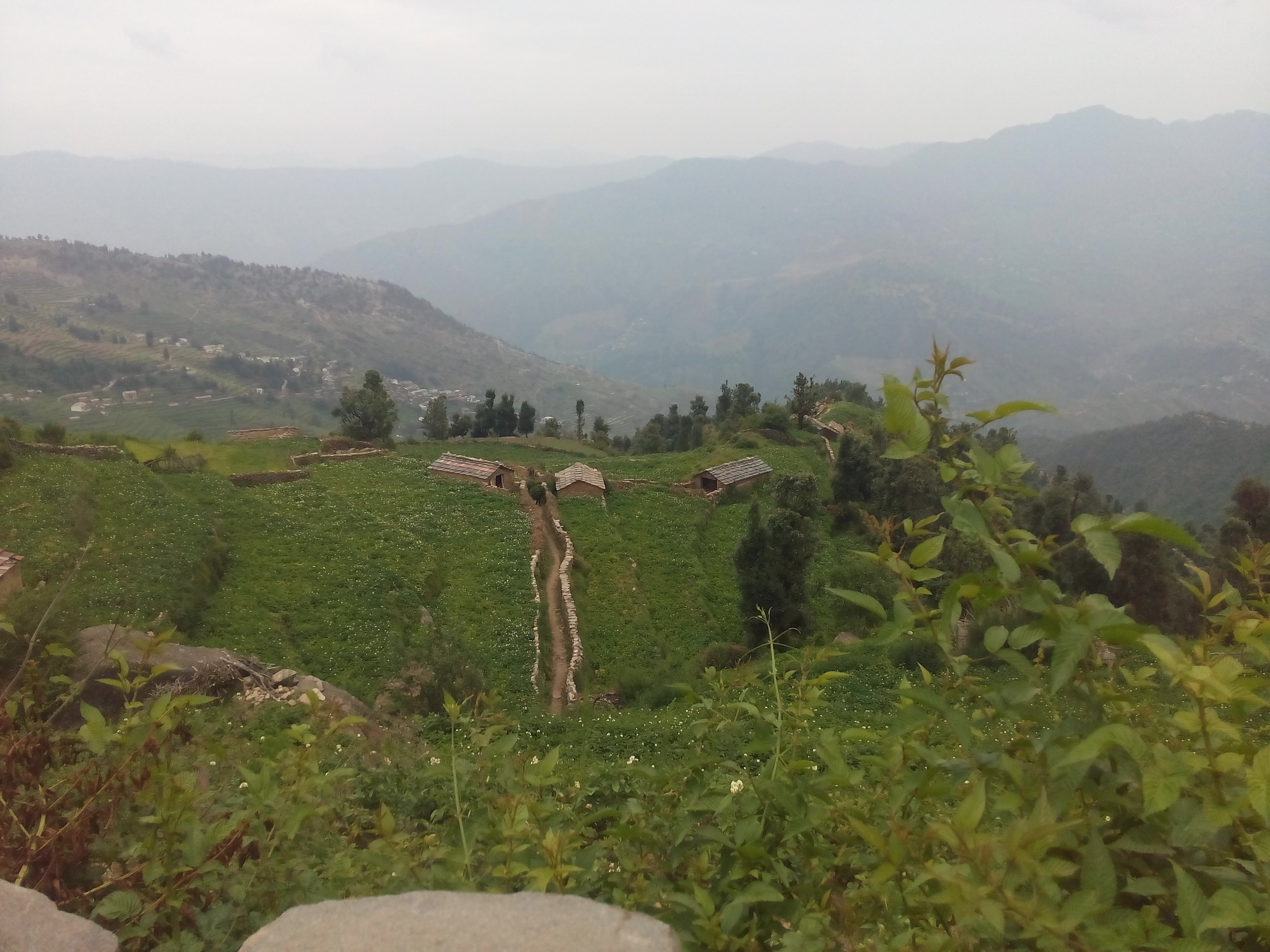
Potato farms during early monsoon

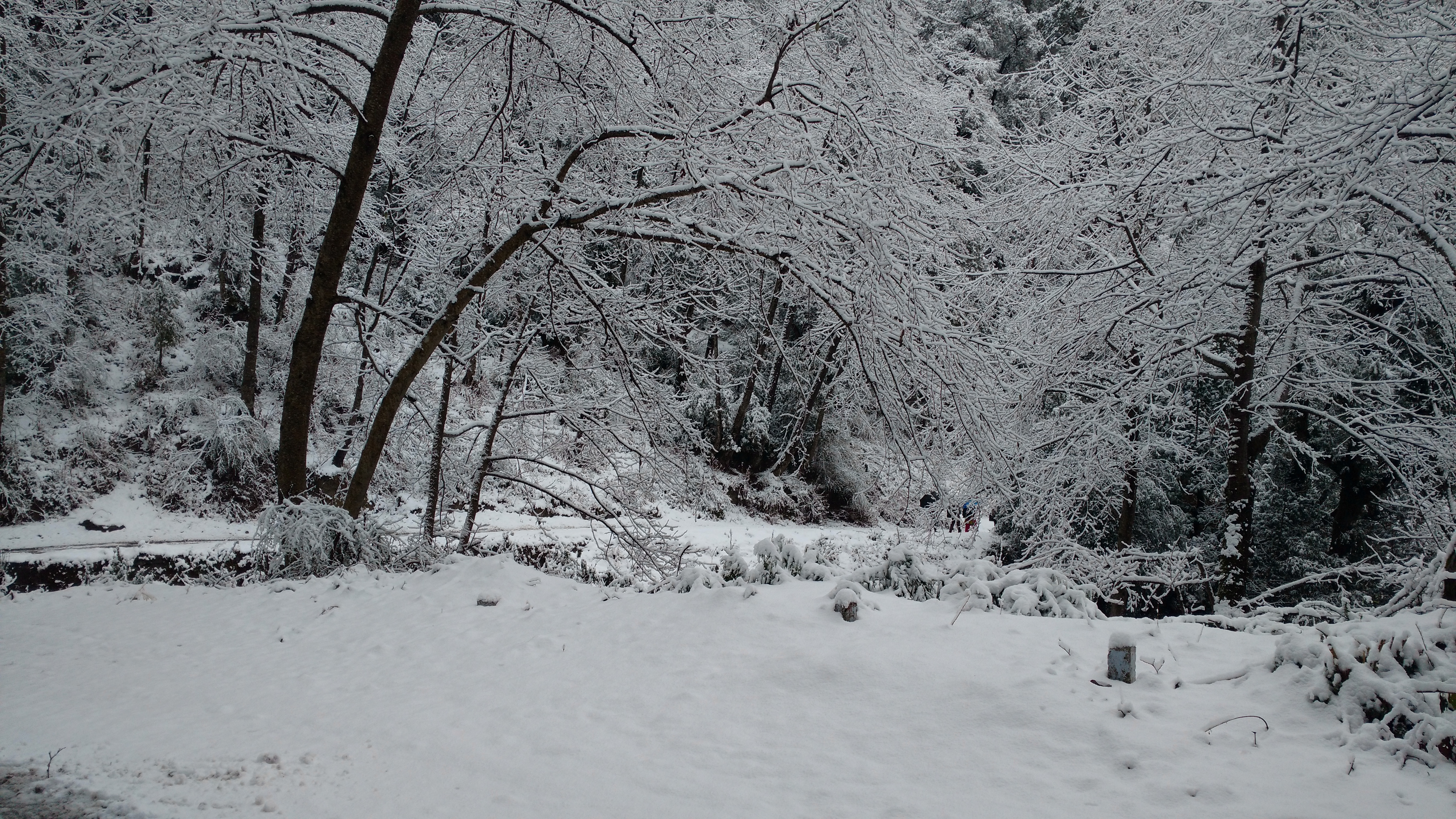
A snow covered forest near Thalisain

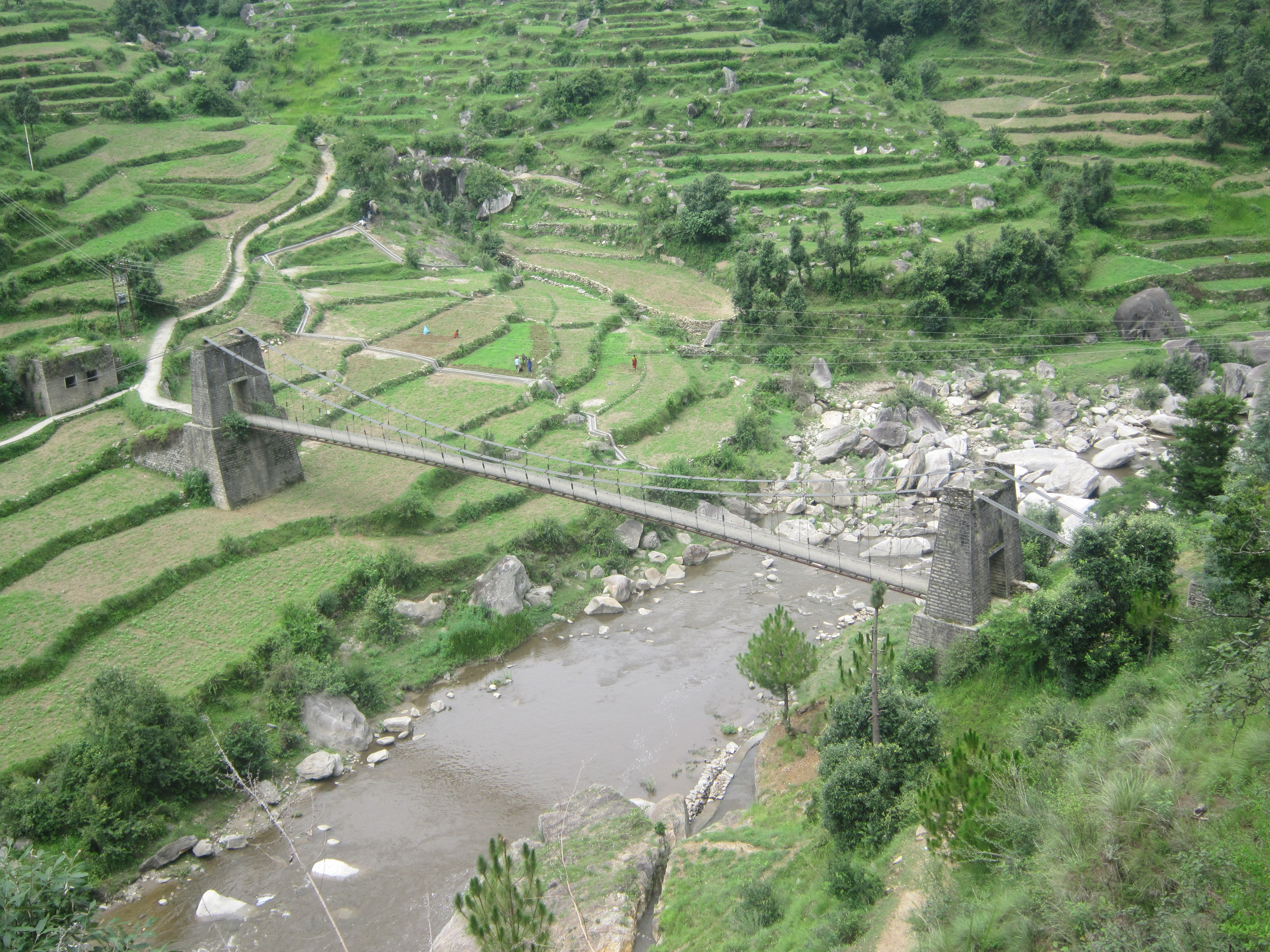
Bridge on a tributary of Nayaar river

== Natural resources ==
* Soil: Thalisain tehsil has a variety of soils depending on the elevation and terrain. As the Nayaar valley broadens in the south, it forms vast beds of fertile alluvial soil which is suitable for rice and other water-intensive crops. As one gains elevation while heading north towards Dudhatoli mountains, the soil gets sandy-loamy with good aeration and drainage. Such soil is suitable for fruits, vegetables and other horticultural produce. North-eastern faces of hills often have humus rich soil as they have stands of dense oak forest.

* Forests: There are chiefly four types of forests found in the region.

1. Chir pine forests: The primary species is Pinus roxburghii. Occurring from 1100 to 2200 metres above sea level, these trees grow on drier slopes. However, commercial plantations have come up recently for producing turpentine, timber-wood, and fuel.
2. Mixed Chir-oak forests: Moist forests at slightly higher elevations with a predominant mix of baanj (Quercus leucotrichophora), Chir pine, rhododendron (Rhododendron arboreum), and kaafal (Myrica esculenta) trees. These forests exist at elevations ranging from 1800 to 2200 metres.
3. Temperate broadleaf forests: The main species found in these forests are maple (Acer caesium and Acer acuminatum), oak (kharsu, tilonj, and moru oaks), hazelnut (Corylus jacquemontii), alder (Alnus nepalensis), and hornbeam (Carpinus viminea). These forests are found at elevations of 2200 to 3100 metres in shady and cool locations often with moisture.
4. Alpine coniferous forests: The dominant species are silver fir, deodar cedar, cypress, juniper, and spruce. Sometimes these trees exist in the same habitat but at many locations, there are stands of one species. These forests grow at elevations of 2200 to 3100 metres.

* Water: Nayaar River with its tributaries as well as hundreds of springs and streams forms the major river system in the region. The region has an abundant supply of water.

== Transport ==
NH 121 runs along the Nayaar river, both forming backbone of the region. Several arterial roads lead to remoter parts and serve as lifelines of the region. Still, a lot of high elevation and remote villages have not got roads yet. Some of these villages, specifically in Dodhatoli range, have a good population. Maroda (near the source of Nayaar river) and Daida (below Bindeshwar temple) are noteworthy examples.

== Demographics ==
As of 2005, Thalisain Block had an area of 584 km^{2}. and a population of 56746 giving it an average population density of 85.46 persons per km^{2}. Sex ratio is 1209 which is considerably higher than the national average of 940 females per 1000 males. Thalisain is pre-dominantly a Hindu majority region, people of other religions have settled here as recently as late 1990s in the last two decades. Hinduism is practised by 99.7% of population, Muslims are 0.2%, and 0.1% didn't state their religion. Total literacy rate is 72.15%, where male literacy rate is at 88.23% and female at 59.09%.

Most of the population of this region is confined to valleys and mid slopes of the hill ranges. The area is totally rural with few rural service centers which are developed in urban characteristics. Most of the population is concentrated on the valleys where as fertile agricultural land is available on the terraces. Moderate concentration of population is found on the gentle slope convex spurs (mid slope). Very sparse population with scattered settlements is located on the water divides and ridges. Concentration of Most of the population is concentrated in the lowest-elevation valleys. As the elevation increases the distribution of population decreases, and the hill ranges have lower population than the valley. Since the very beginning the settlements were located near the source of water. In the valley areas abundance of water in the form of perennial springs and rivers supports a dense population. Lack of water resources on the high hill ranges are responsible for scattered settlements with low population density.

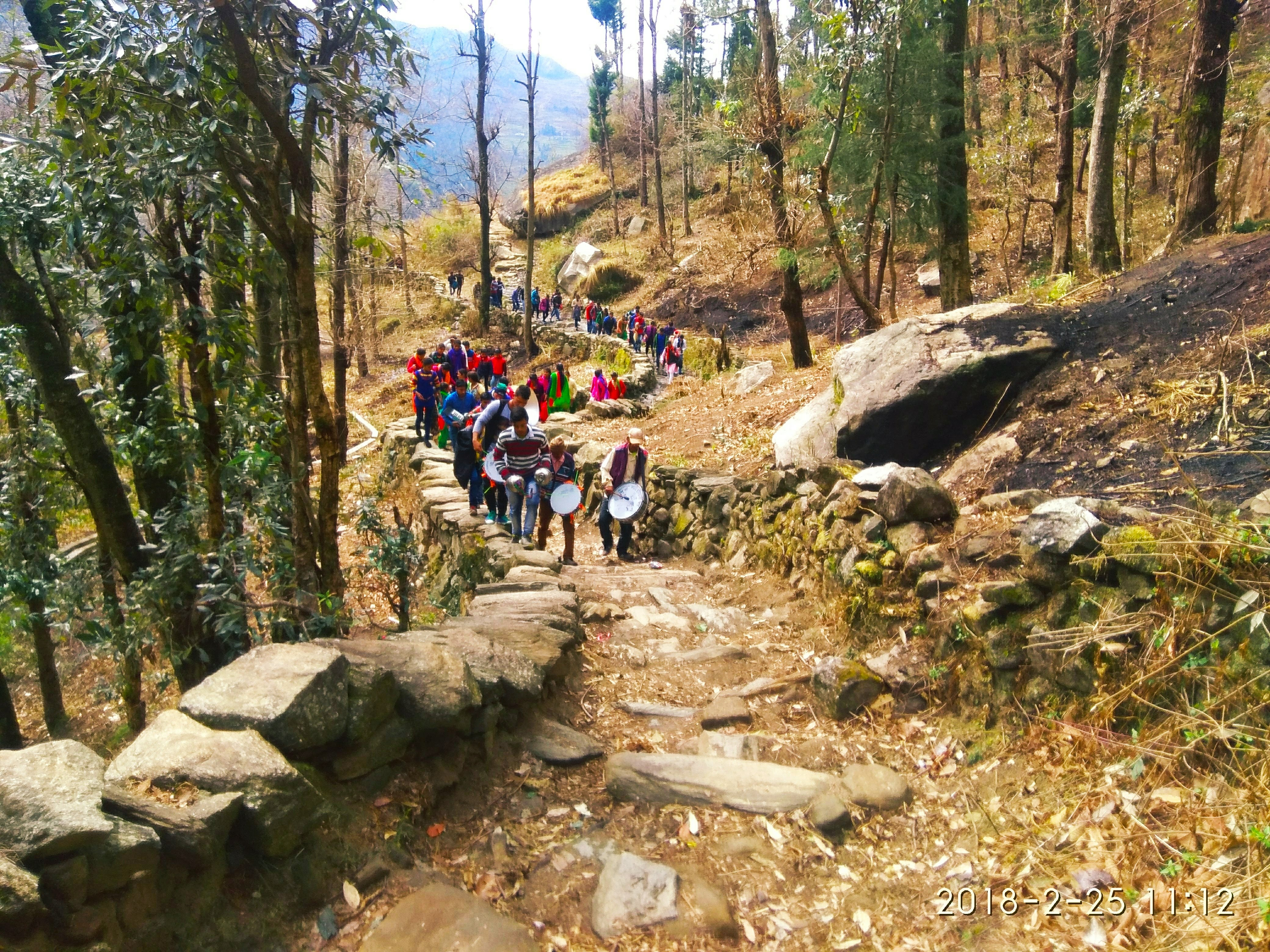
A typical Garhwali wedding procession

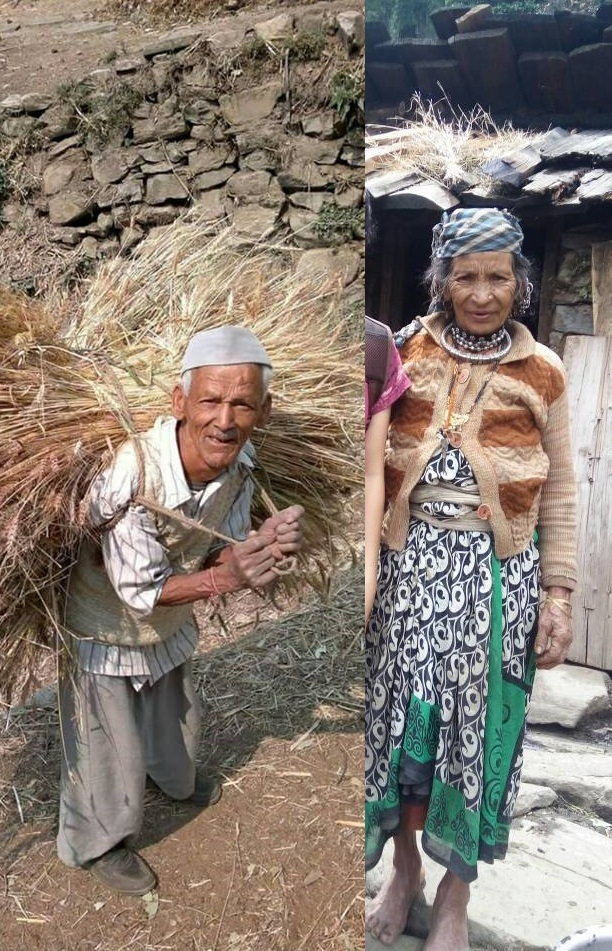
Local people in traditional attire

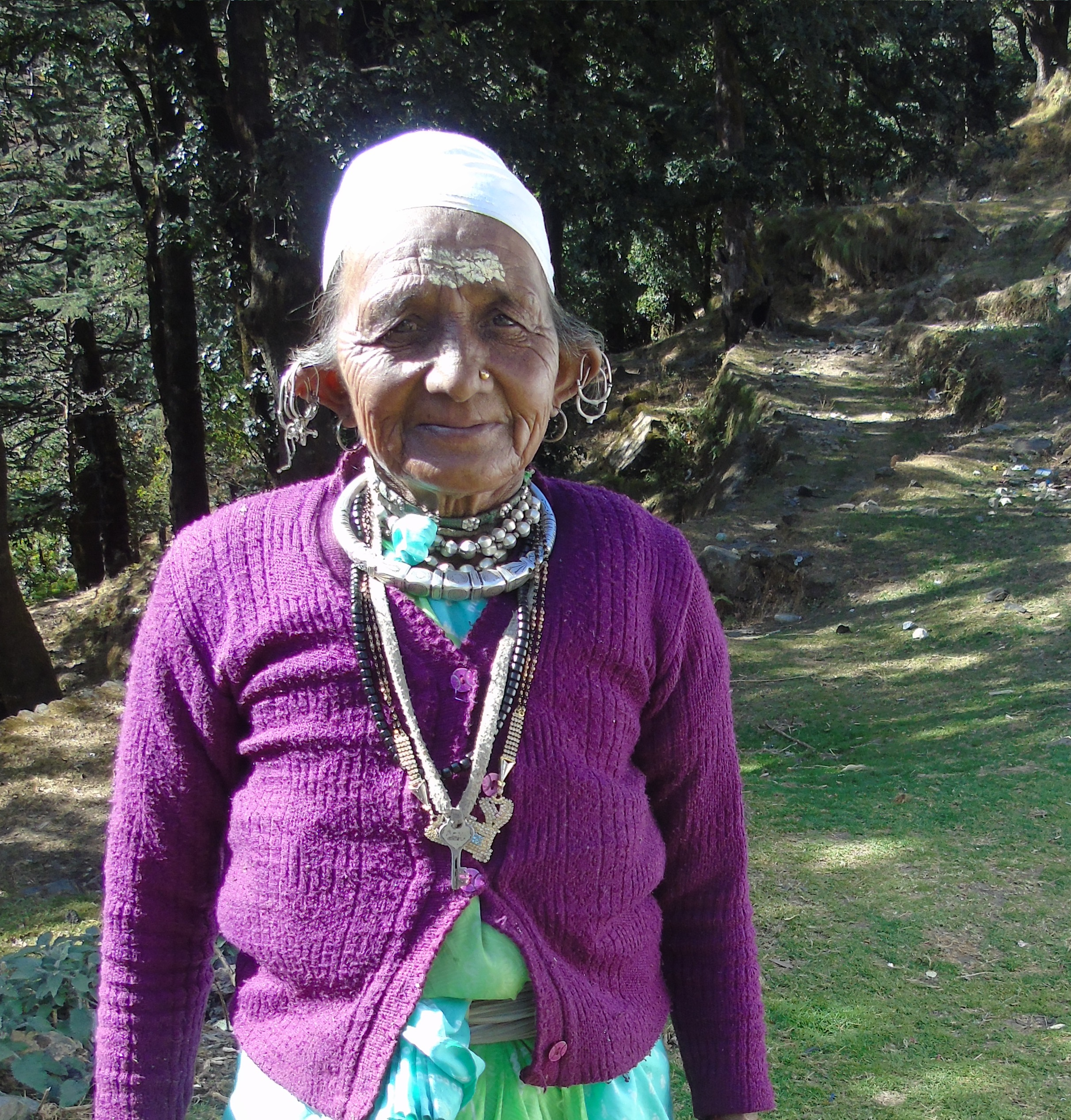
A pilgrim at Bindeshwar temple

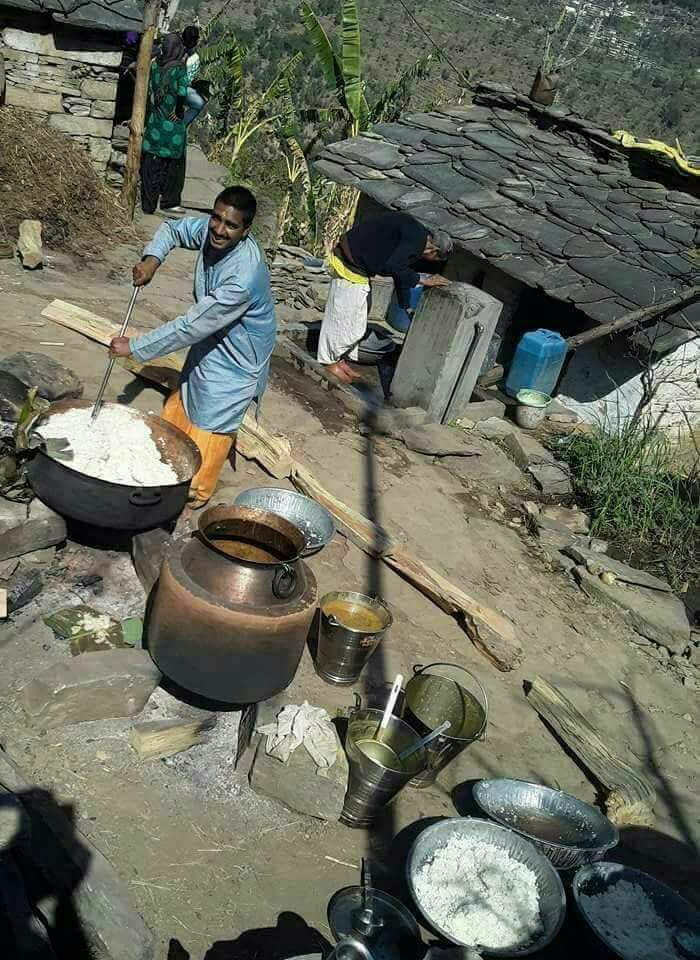
Preparing food for a wedding feast

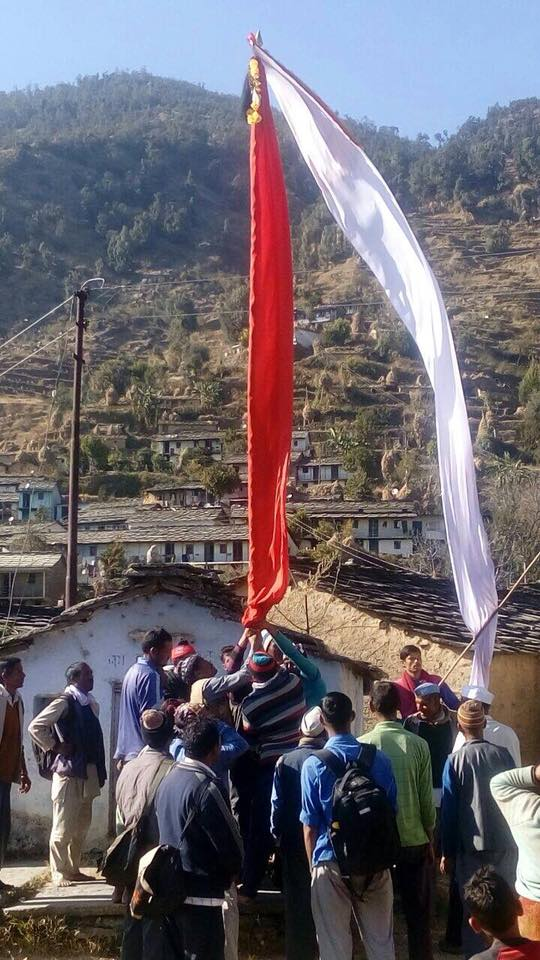
Heralding arrival of the deity

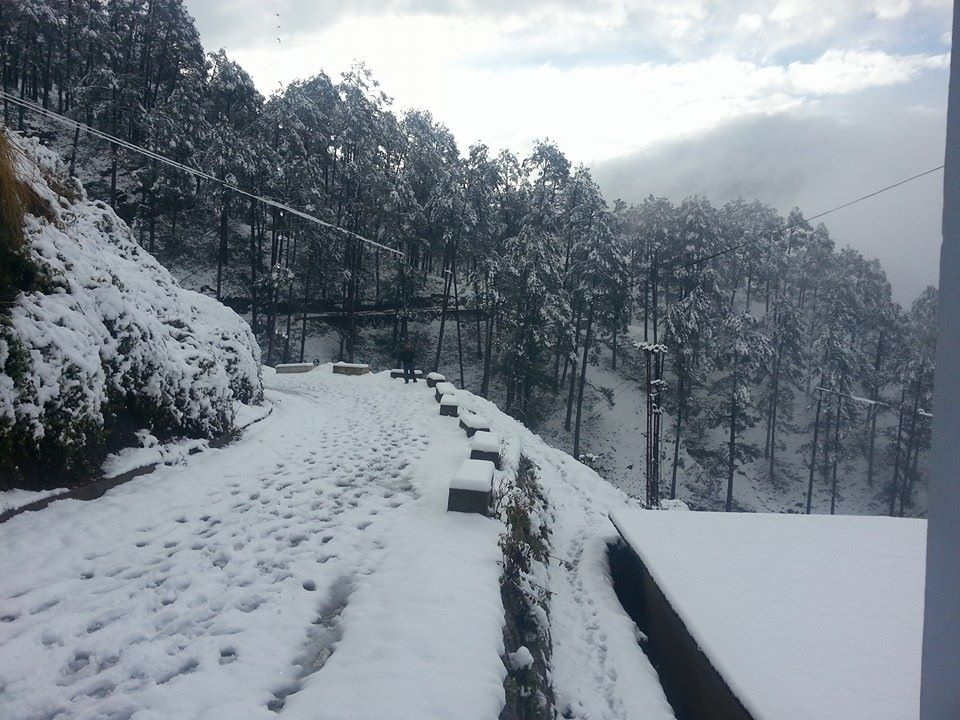
A snowy day

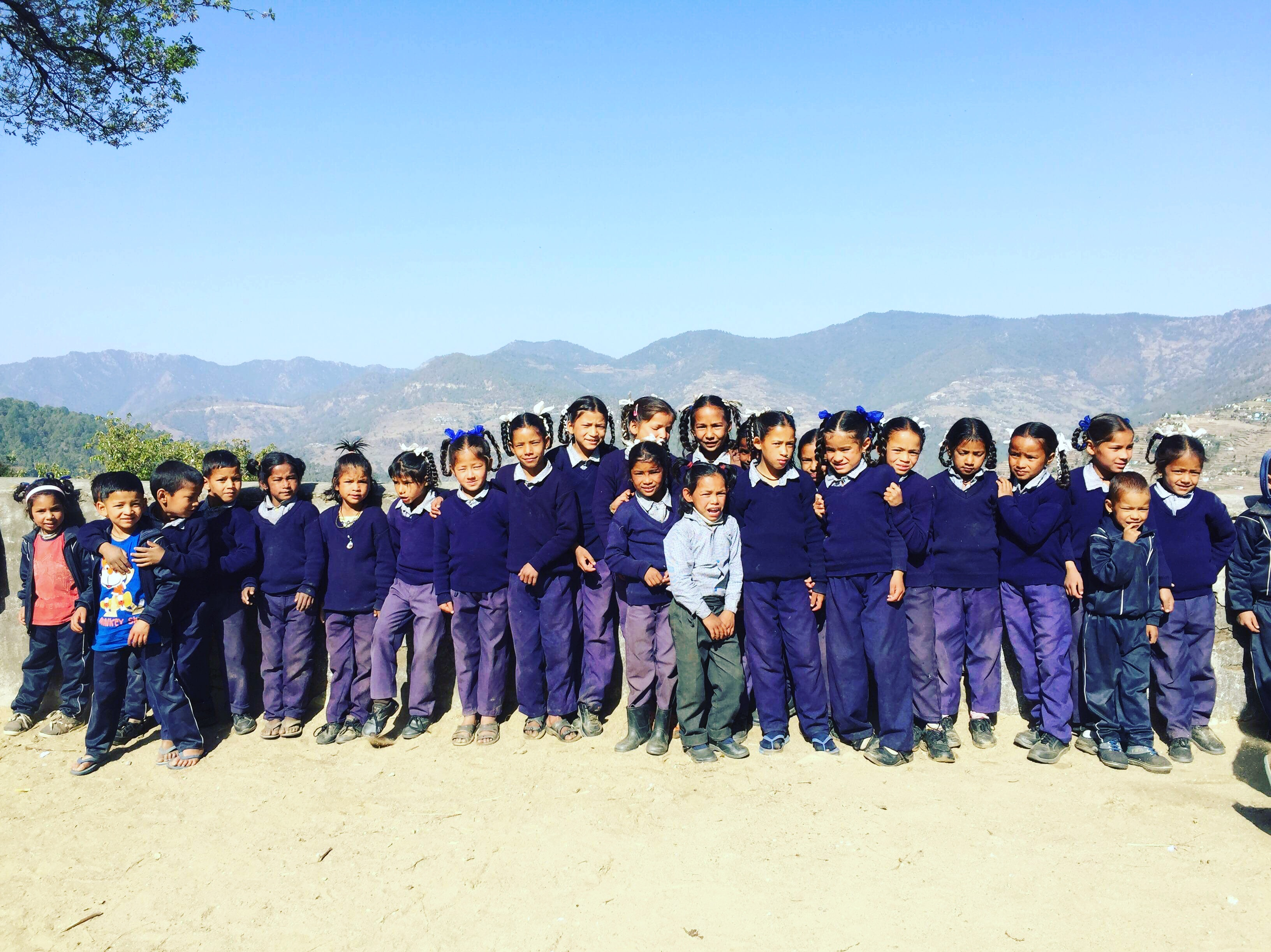
School children

== Culture ==
The upper part of Thalisain and Nayaar Valley has been historically known as “Raath” and has its own dialect of Garhwali language known as Rathwali Dialect Or Rathi a word which is also proudly used as a demonym by locals. The word Raath is said to be originated from Rahu, as there's a Rahu temple nearby. While the word “Salaan” is used to describe the area to the south of Raath, in the low-lying regions of Nayaar valley. In the upper reaches of Nayaar valley, one can still see the dying customs and rituals of Garhwal. Men wrap rough-spun tunics of Sheep's wool around their torso and women are often bedecked with a dozen ornaments. They still perform folk-dances to the tunes of traditional musical instruments. The villagers and villages here are bound with each other by a strong sense of community. Perhaps lack of infrastructure has brought them closer to each other. While the Salaan region is haunted by desertion, villages of Raath have flourished by their hard work and farming skills. Known to be a hard-working and peaceful community, people of this region have been producing the best fruits and vegetables in the region. People here are deeply religious. Religion and culture is deeply intertwined in these mountains. Although, there are many folk-deities in the Garhwal region, Ghandiyal devta is quite popular here in the upper reaches of Thalisain and with a good number of temples dedicated to him. Other than that, Goreel Devta, Deeba, Narsingh, Narankaar and several forms of mother goddess are also worshipped.
