= Hatu peak =

Mountain in Himachal Pradesh, India

Hatu Peak (Hatu Mata Temple)
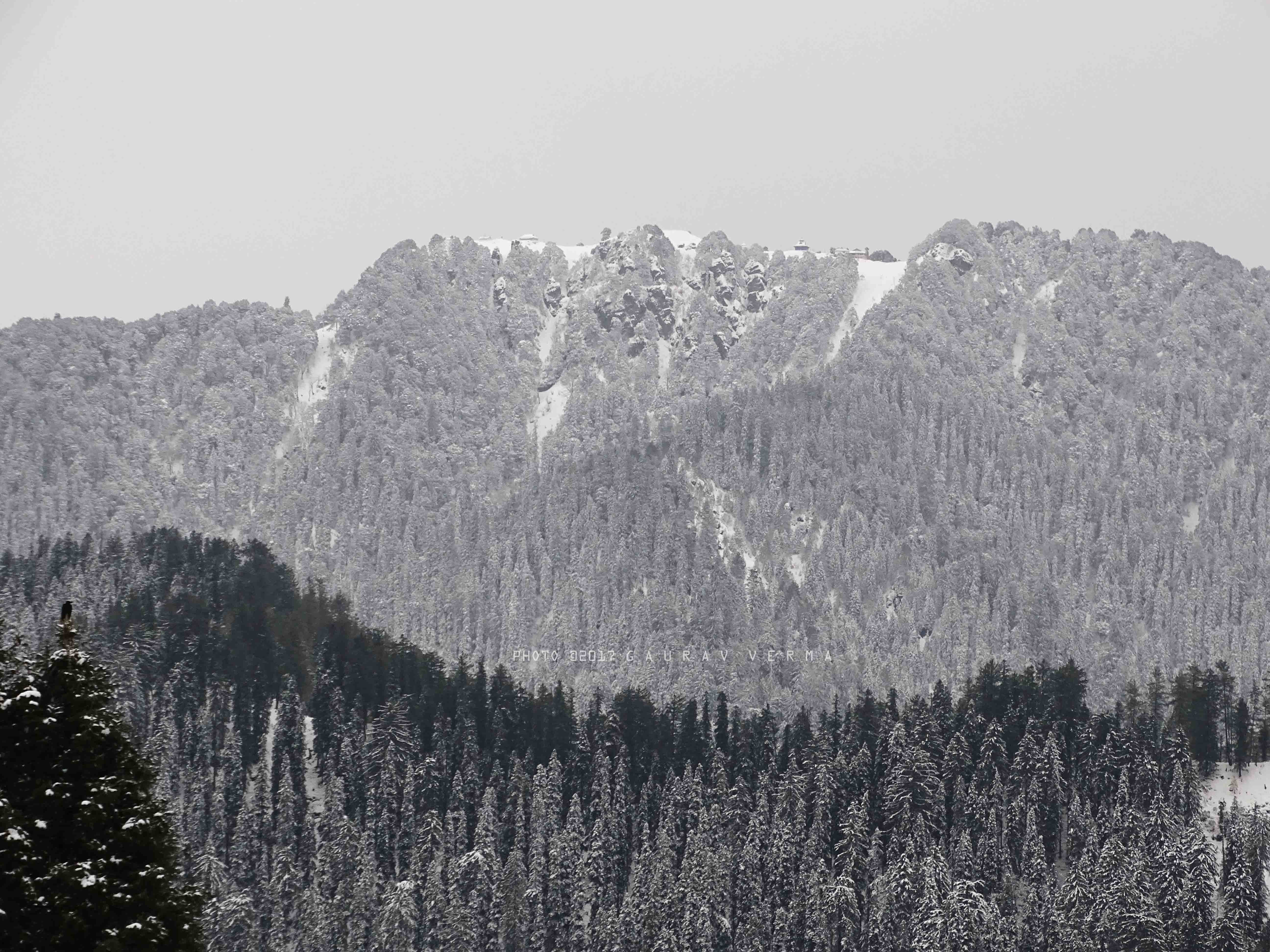
- Hatu Peak as seen from Narkanda, India.

Highest point
- Elevation: 3,400 m (11,200 ft)
- Coordinates: 31°14′32.9″N 77°30′01.1″E

Naming
- Language of name: Hindi

Geography
- Location within India
- Location: Narkanda, Tehsil Kumarsain, Himachal Pradesh, India.

Hatu Peak is located in the Kumarsain tehsil and Shimla district of Himachal Pradesh in India. It is one of the highest peaks in the region of Kumarsain tehsil, standing at an elevation of 3400 meters (11,200 ft) above sea level. The peak is surrounded by a dense forest of conifers, oaks, and maples.

== Location ==
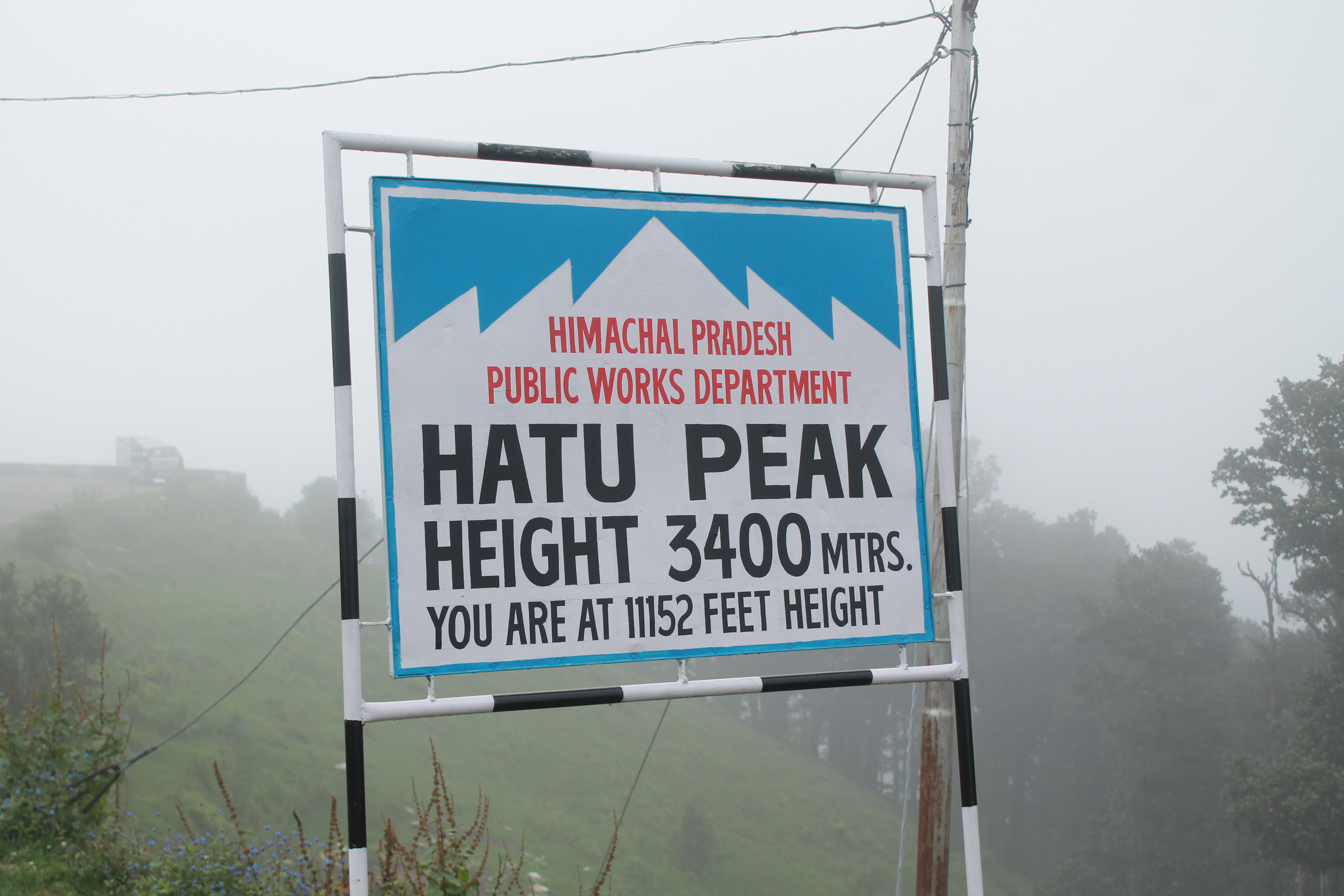
HPPWD Kumarsain Division Sign Board showing the elevation of Hatu Peak from main sea level

Hatu Peak lies beside National Highway 5 nearly 71 km from Shimla. From Narkanda, the peak is accessible by bike or car.

== Attractions ==
=== Hatu Temple ===
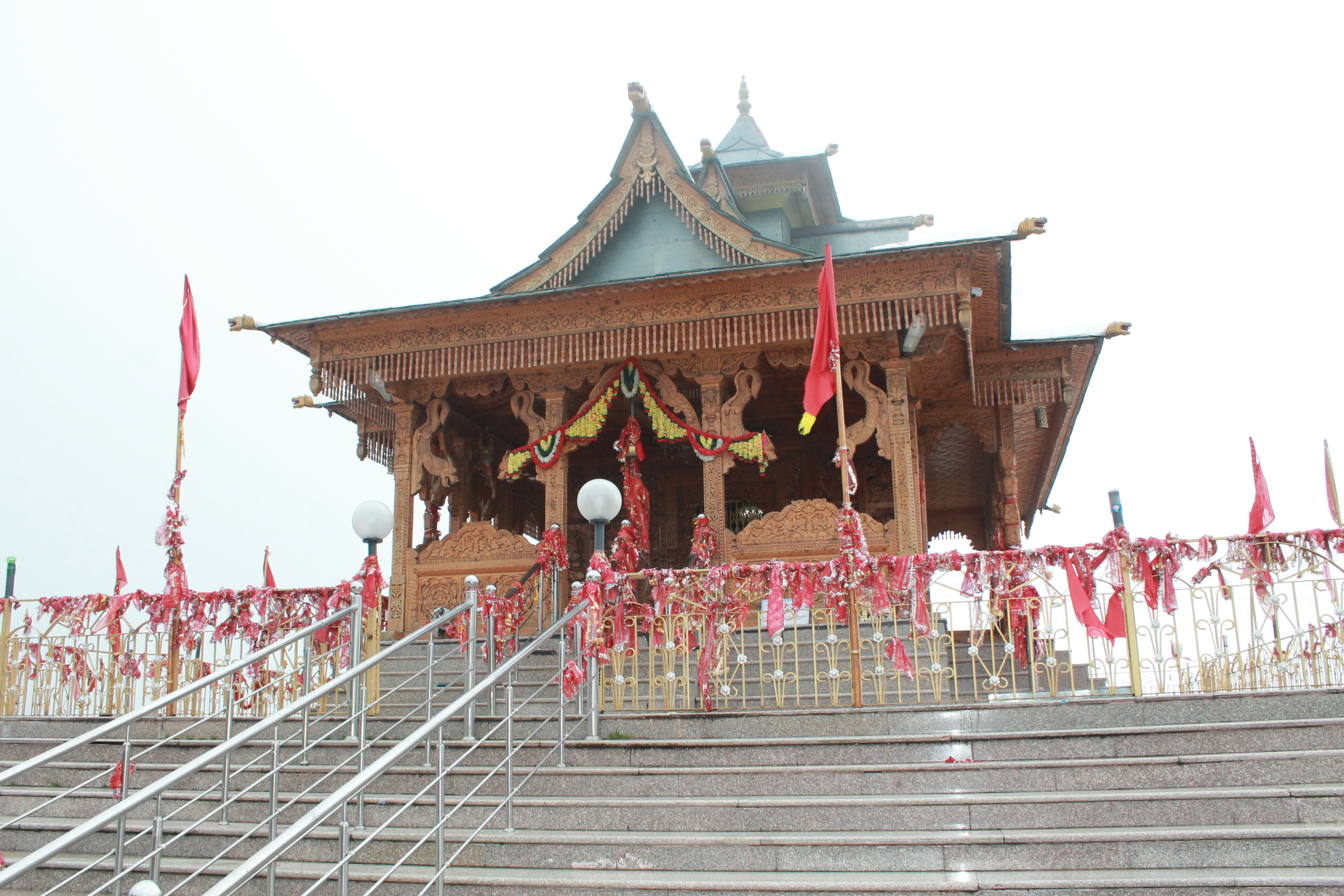
The Hatu Temple

At the top of the peak is a small wooden temple called Hatu temple. According to local belief, the famous Hatu Mata temple is the temple of Maa Kaali. On the first Sunday of Jyeshtha, groups of people arrive in large numbers to engage in rituals. Near the temple, there is an ancient stove-like formation of rocks that locals believe to be used by the Pandavas brothers to cook their food during their Agyaat Vaas.

=== Tourist House ===
A small structure was built to be used on rare occasions by civil authorities.

=== Scenic Views ===
The steep road to Hatu Peak provides scenic views of the Himalayas.

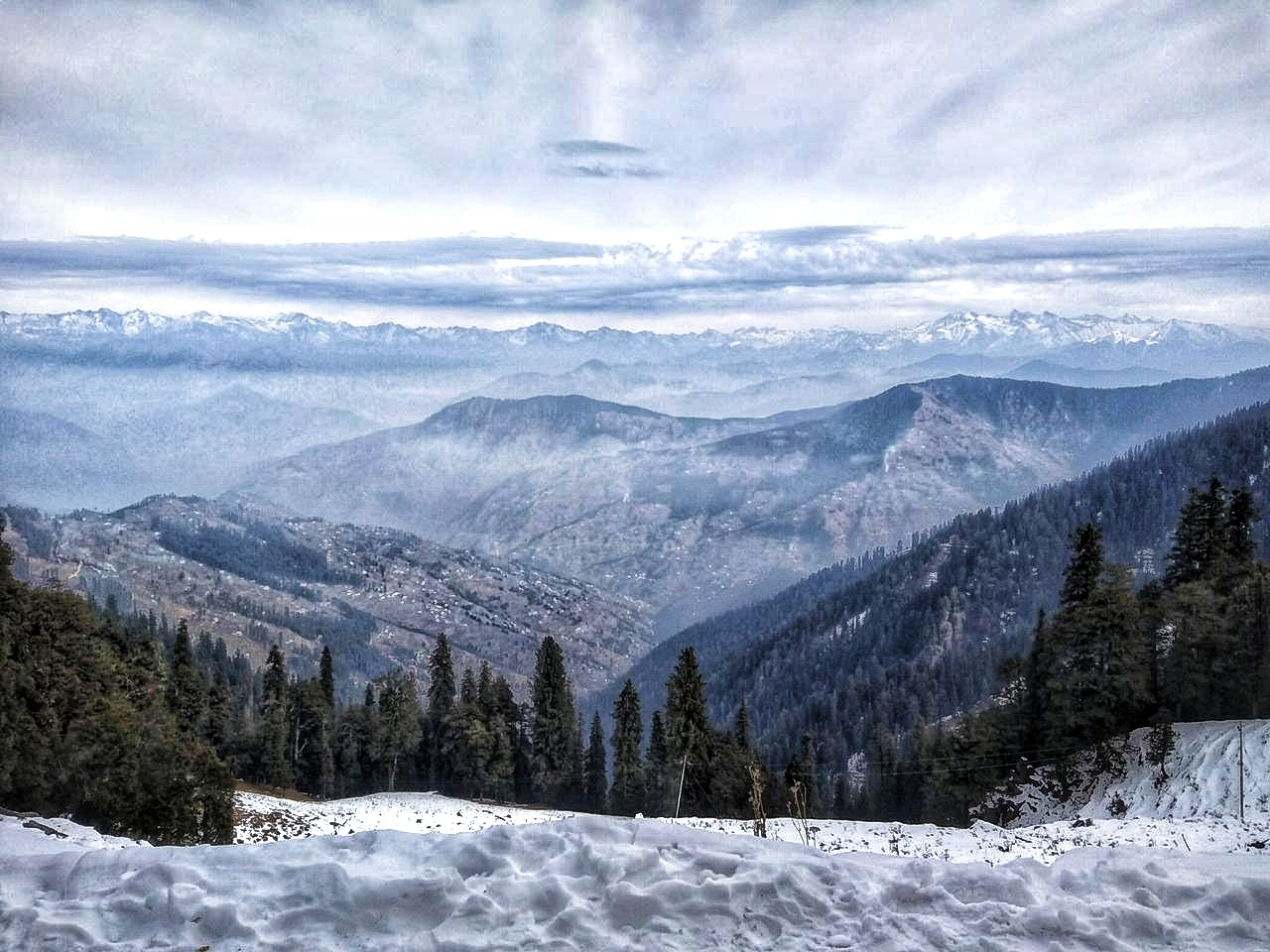
The shot was taken on 24 December 2017 in Narkanda (Shimla, Himachal Pradesh, India) on the way to Hatu Peak. The picture portrays the neighbouring peaks of Hatu Peak.

== Flora ==
The peak and the surrounding area is dominated by a large temperate forest mostly consist of Conifer, Oak, Maple, Populus, Aesculus, Corylus and Holly species.

Conifer: There are various species of conifers growing in the area which cover the substantial part of the forest. These are:

- Abies pindrow,
- Cedrus deodara,
- Cryptomeria japonica,
- Picea smithiana,
- Pinus wallichiana,
- Taxus contorta.

Oak: Quercus semecarpifolia and Quercus floribunda are native to the area.

Maple: Acer caesium, Acer acuminatum and Acer cappadocicum are native to the area.

Poplar: Populus ciliata is native to the area.

Aesculus: Aesculus indica is native to the area.

Hazelnut: Corylus jacquemontii is native to the area.

Holly: Ilex dipyrena is native to the area.

Apart from these major trees, there are various species shrubs like Berberis aristata and flower plants growing in the area. Recently, the forest has been cleared for the apple orchards.

== Accessibility ==
The small hill station of Narkanda (at 2708 m) is the start for the journey to the top of Hatu Peak.

=== Air ===
Shimla has a small airstrip located on a nearby hill top (in Jubbarhatti, about 23 km south of town). This airstrip is too small to support jets, so the only service available is from Jagson Airlines which offers single flight service into Shimla from Delhi on Monday, Wednesday and Friday.

=== Train ===
A narrow gauge "toy" train service runs from Kalka to Shimla. This service takes about 4 hours to wind up the ridges to the hill station.

=== Bus ===
There are numerous bus services to Shimla from Delhi, Manali, and Chandigarh on a daily basis.

== Facilities ==
Hatu Peak is uninhabited and therefore few facilities are available at the top. There is a tourist lodge by HPTC 1 km below the peak which can be used for general facilities and accommodation.
