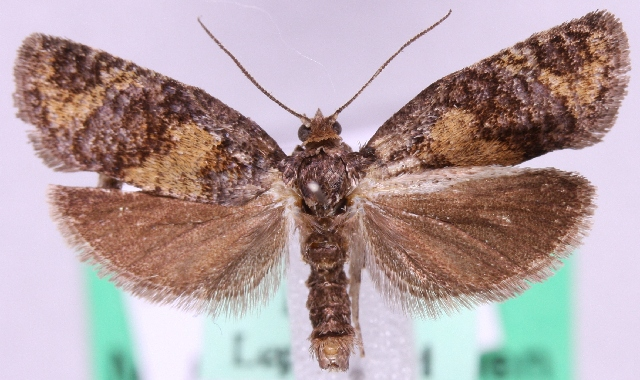

Scientific classification
- Domain: Eukaryota
- Kingdom: Animalia
- Phylum: Arthropoda
- Class: Insecta
- Order: Lepidoptera
- Family: Tortricidae
- Genus: Ptycholomoides
- Species: P. aeriferana

Binomial name
- Ptycholomoides aeriferana (Herrich-Schäffer, 1851)

Synonyms
- Tortrix (Coccyx) aeriferana Herrich-Schaffer, 1851; aeriferana Herrich-Schaffer, 1848; Cacoecia aeriferana f. jottrandi Dufrane, 1942

= Ptycholomoides aeriferana =

Species of moth

Ptycholomoides aeriferana, the larch twist, is a species of moth of the family Tortricidae. It is found in China (Heilongjiang), the Korean Peninsula, Japan, Russia (Ussuri, Amur) and most of Europe.

The wingspan is 17–21 mm for males and 19–24 mm for females. Adults are on wing from June to August.

The larvae feed on Acer acuminatum, Larix (including Larix leptolepis) and Betula species. They spin the needles of their host plant. Larvae can be found from May to June. Pupation takes place within the larval shelter.
