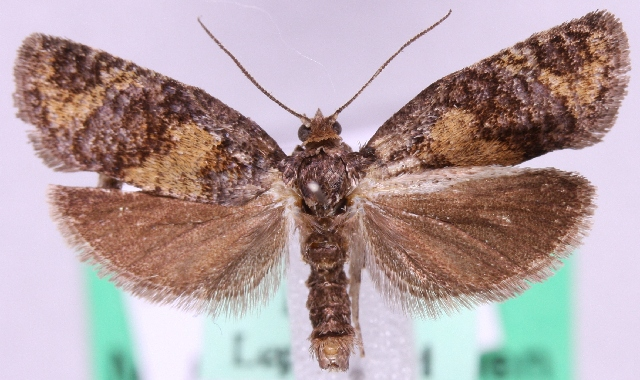
- Ptycholomoides aeriferana

Scientific classification
- Domain: Eukaryota
- Kingdom: Animalia
- Phylum: Arthropoda
- Class: Insecta
- Order: Lepidoptera
- Family: Tortricidae
- Tribe: Archipini
- Genus: Ptycholomoides; Obraztsov, 1954

= Ptycholomoides =

Genus of tortrix moths

Ptycholomoides is a genus of moths in the tribe Archipini.

== Species ==
- Ptycholomoides aeriferana (Herrich-Schäffer, 1851)
