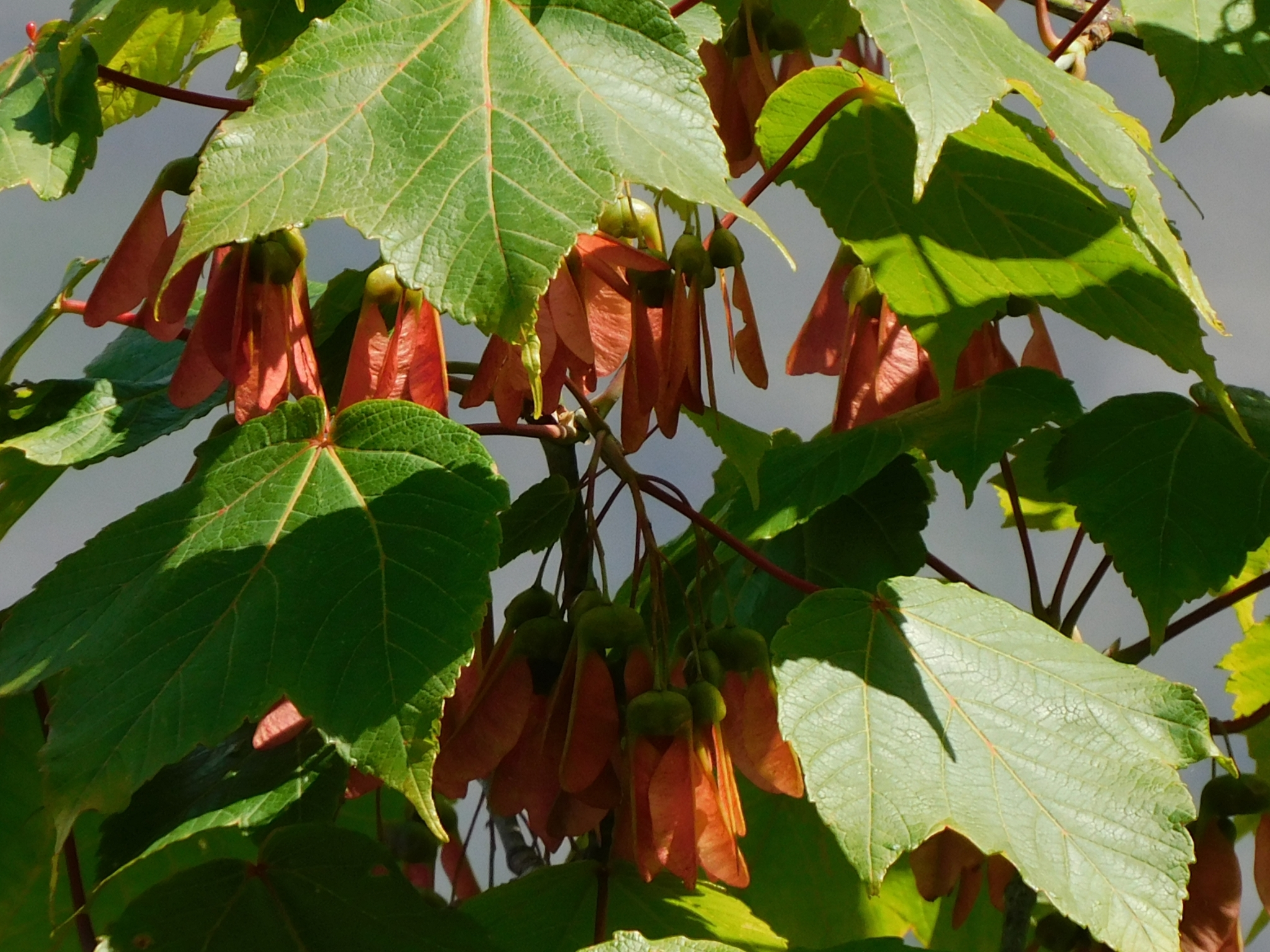

Conservation status
- Least Concern (IUCN 3.1)

Scientific classification
- Kingdom: Plantae
- Clade: Tracheophytes
- Clade: Angiosperms
- Clade: Eudicots
- Clade: Rosids
- Order: Sapindales
- Family: Sapindaceae
- Genus: Acer
- Section: Acer sect. Acer
- Series: Acer ser. Acer
- Species: A. caesium

Binomial name
- Acer caesium Wall. ex Brandis 1874

Synonyms
- Acer luteolum Borbás; Acer molle Pax 1889 not Opiz 1824; Acer giraldii Pax

= Acer caesium =

Himalayan maple

Species of plant

Acer caesium, the Himalayan maple, is an Asian species of maple found in India, Pakistan, Nepal, and China (Gansu, Henan, Hubei, Ningxia, Shaanxi, Sichuan, Tibet, Yunnan).

Acer caesium is a tree up to 25 m (82.0 ft) tall, with gray bark. Leaves are non-compound, with 5 shallow lobes, the blade up to 10 cm (3.9 in) long, with teeth along the edges.

Acer caesium subspecies giraldii grows to approximately 10 m (32.8 ft) tall, and is found in north-western China. The flowers are a bluish white and born on young shoots in the spring. The subspecies epithet is a patronym honoring Italian missionary Giraldi.
