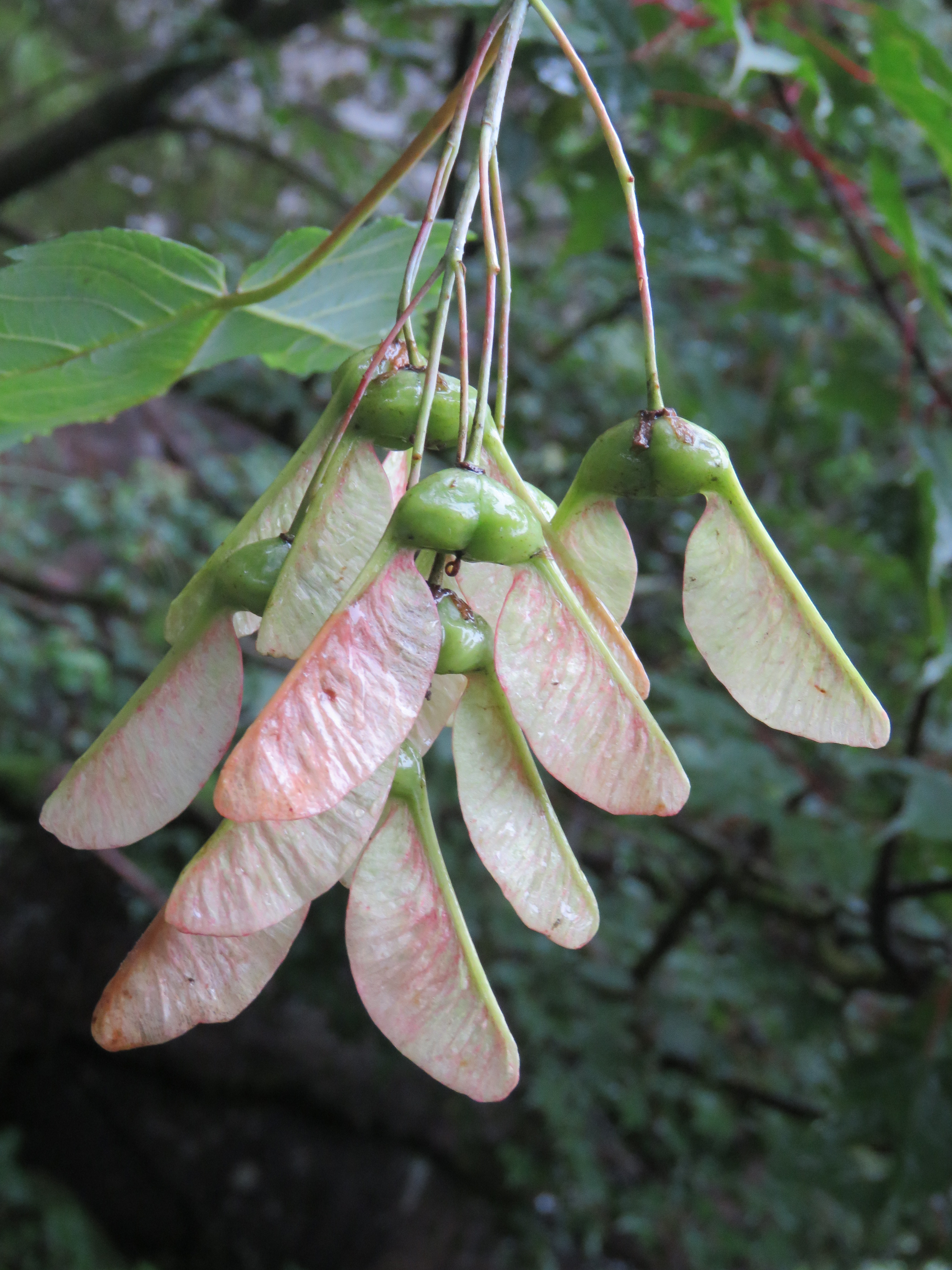

Conservation status
- Least Concern (IUCN 3.1)

Scientific classification
- Kingdom: Plantae
- Clade: Tracheophytes
- Clade: Angiosperms
- Clade: Eudicots
- Clade: Rosids
- Order: Sapindales
- Family: Sapindaceae
- Genus: Acer
- Section: Acer sect. Arguta
- Species: A. acuminatum

Binomial name
- Acer acuminatum Wall. ex D.Don 1825

Synonyms
- Acer caudatum G. Nicholson 1881 not Wall. 1831; Acer sterculiaceum K. Koch 1869 not Wall. 1830

= Acer acuminatum =

Species of maple

Acer acuminatum is an Asian species of maple native to the Himalayas and neighboring mountains in Tibet, Kashmir, northern India, Nepal, and Pakistan.

Acer acuminatum is a multi-stemmed tree up to 10 meters tall. It is dioecious, meaning that male and female flowers form on separate plants. Leaves are up to 12 across, each with 3 or 5 lobes. The apexes of its leaves are both caudate and acuminate. Its infructescence ranges from 12 to 20 centimeters long.
