= Bironkhal =

Tehsil and development block in Uttarakhand, India

- Tehsil and development Block
- Interactive map of Bironkhal
- Location in Uttarakhand, India Bironkhal (India)
- Coordinates: 29.840°N 79.031°E
- Country: India
- State: Uttarakhand
- District: Pauri Garhwal
- Block: Bironkhal
- Elevation: 1,540 m (5,050 ft)

Languages
  - Official: Hindi
  - Native: Garhwali
- Time zone: UTC+5:30
- PIN: 246276
- Vehicle registration: UK-12
- Website: pauri.gov.in

Bironkhal is a small hill town, Tehsil and Development block located in the Pauri Garhwal district of the Indian state of Uttarakhand. It is one of the 14 tehsils in the district and is headquartered in the town of Syunsi. This region is on the border of Kumaun and near the Dudhatoli range.

== Geography ==
Bironkhal lies in the Lower Himalayas, at approximately 29.75° N, 79.02° E. with forested slopes, valleys, ridges and terraced agriculture. The area forms part of the Bironkhal range and Nayar River catchment. The Eastern and Western Nayyar rivers originate in the Dudhatoli range, join at Satpuli, and contribute to the Alaknanda River system.

Nayaar stream

The town is situated at an elevation of approximately 1,540 metres (4,900 feet) above sea level. Its topography is predominantly hilly, characterised by steep and moderately sloping terrain, narrow valleys, forested ridges and cultivated terraces. Elevation increases toward the surrounding Himalayan ridges and the Dudatoli range, while local drainage follows the valleys toward the Nayyar river system.

== Climate ==
The climate is sub-temperate to temperate, with most rainfall occurring during the June–September monsoon.

Climate data for Bironkhal
Month	Jan	Feb	Mar	Apr	May	Jun	Jul	Aug	Sep	Oct	Nov	Dec	Year
Mean daily maximum °C (°F)	13.5 (56.3)	15.6 (60.1)	19.8 (67.6)	24.6 (76.3)	26.4 (79.5)	26.1 (79.0)	24.0 (75.2)	23.6 (74.5)	23.2 (73.8)	21.3 (70.3)	18.6 (65.5)	15.6 (60.1)	21.0 (69.9)
Daily mean °C (°F)	7.2 (45.0)	9.4 (48.9)	13.4 (56.1)	18.1 (64.6)	20.6 (69.1)	21.7 (71.1)	21.0 (69.8)	20.6 (69.1)	19.3 (66.7)	15.8 (60.4)	12.3 (54.1)	8.9 (48.0)	15.7 (60.2)
Mean daily minimum °C (°F)	1.6 (34.9)	3.5 (38.3)	6.8 (44.2)	11.2 (52.2)	14.5 (58.1)	17.2 (63.0)	18.7 (65.7)	18.3 (64.9)	16.0 (60.8)	10.8 (51.4)	6.7 (44.1)	3.2 (37.8)	10.7 (51.3)
Average rainfall mm (inches)	38 (1.5)	62 (2.4)	46 (1.8)	43 (1.7)	80 (3.1)	228 (9.0)	547 (21.5)	499 (19.6)	235 (9.3)	35 (1.4)	7 (0.3)	17 (0.7)	1,837 (72.3)
Average rainy days	4	6	6	6	10	15	21	21	17	6	1	2	115
Average relative humidity (%)	73	67	56	44	51	67	88	89	85	73	69	71	69
Source: Climate-Data.org

== History ==
This was the area of operations of the famous lady warrior Tilu Rauteli of Garhwal.

Tilu Rauteli Statue in Bironkhal Market Pauri Garhwal

== Administration ==
Bironkhal is one of the 15 development blocks of Pauri Garhwal district, comprising 102 gram panchayats and 267 villages. It is also a tehsil within the Thalisain subdivision. It was created in 2016 with 367 villages taken from Dhumakot, Chaubattakhal and Thalisain tehsils.

== Demographics ==
Garhwali is the principal regional language. While Hindi is used as a Lingua franca.

== Economy ==
The main economic activities in the region include agriculture, forestry, and tourism. Bironkhal serves as an administrative and commercial centre for the surrounding area.

=== Healthcare ===
The Community Health Centre, Bironkhal provides healthcare services to the town and surrounding area.

== Transport ==
Bironkhal is connected to nearby settlements by regional roads, and National Highway NH 309 which constitute the principal means of transportation.

== See also ==
- Thalisain
- Nayar River
- Dhumakot
- Rikhanikhal
