= Isoti =

Village in Pauri Garhwal

Isoti Village
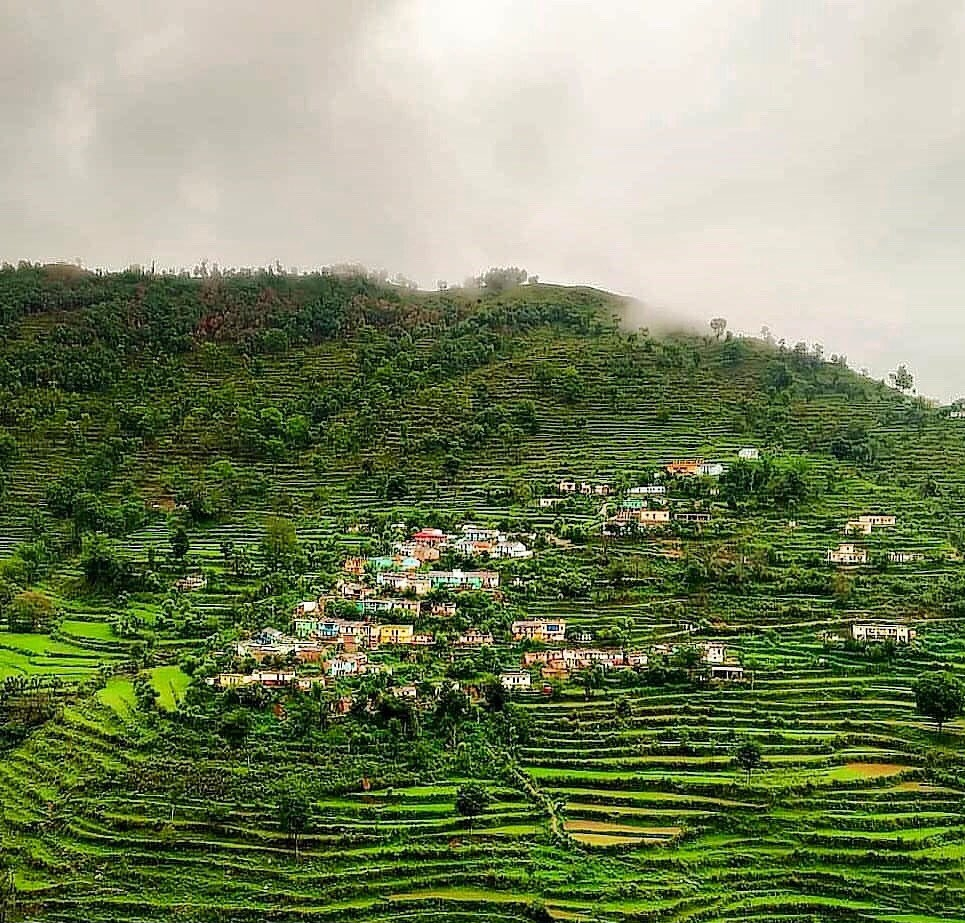

- Location in Uttarakhand Location in India
- Coordinates: 30.0216°N 78.87°E
- Country: India
- State: Uttarakhand
- District: Pauri Garhwal district
- Elevation: 1,780 m (5,840 ft)

Population (2011)
  - Total: 397

Languages
  - Official: Hindi, Garhwali
- Time zone: UTC+5:30 (IST)
- Postal code: 246162
- Vehicle registration: UK 12

Isoti is a village in Pauri Garhwal district of Uttarakhand.

It is 26 km (16 mi) from sub-district headquarter Chaubattakhal and 65 km (40 mi) from district headquarter Pauri. As per 2011 stats, Isoti is the gram panchayat of Isoti village.

== Geography ==
Isoti is located at the altitude of 1,780 metres (5,840 ft). It is 70 km (43 mi) from district headquarter Pauri and 25 km (16 mi) from block Ekeshwar. The village encompasses an area of 169 hectares (420 acres). The nearby market is Tunakhal and main market is Satpuli.

== Religious shrines ==
The famous local temple is Deeba Mandir, dedicated to goddess Deeba (considered preserver of forest).

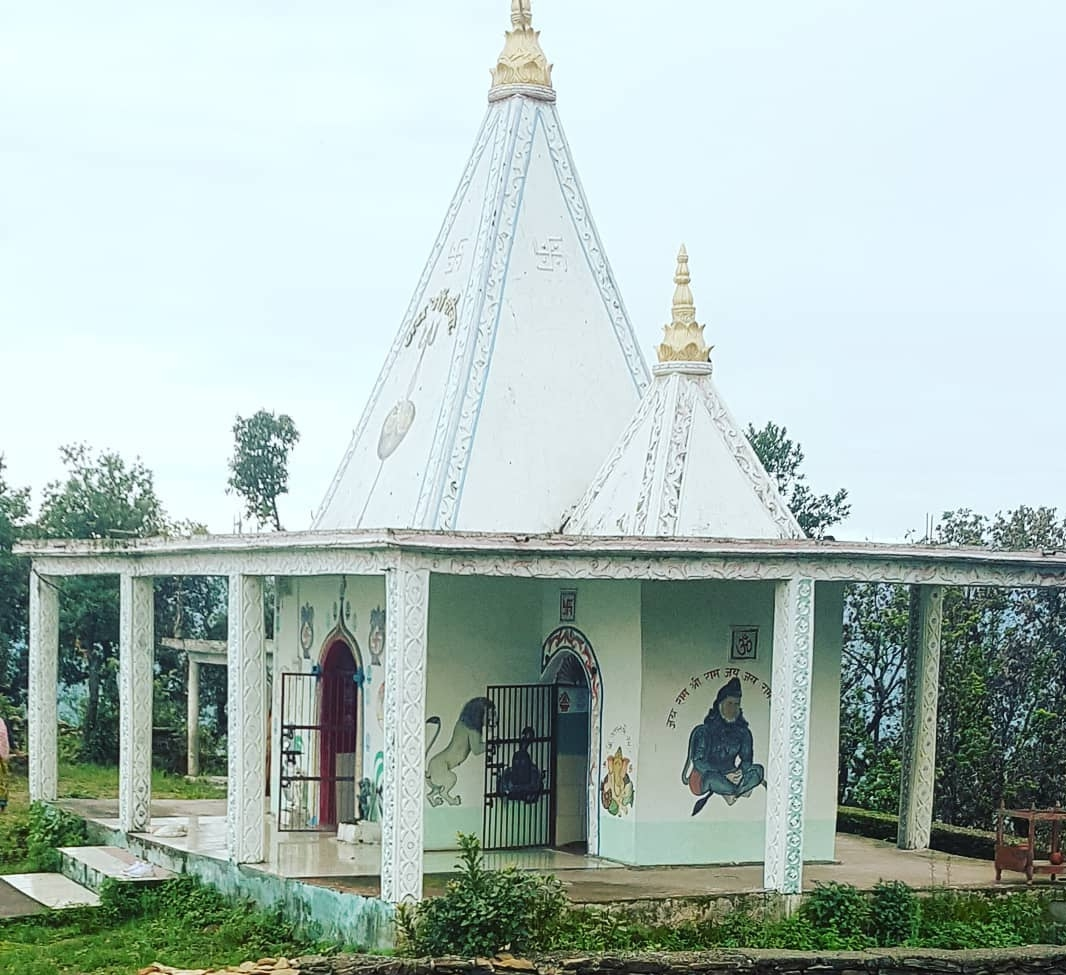

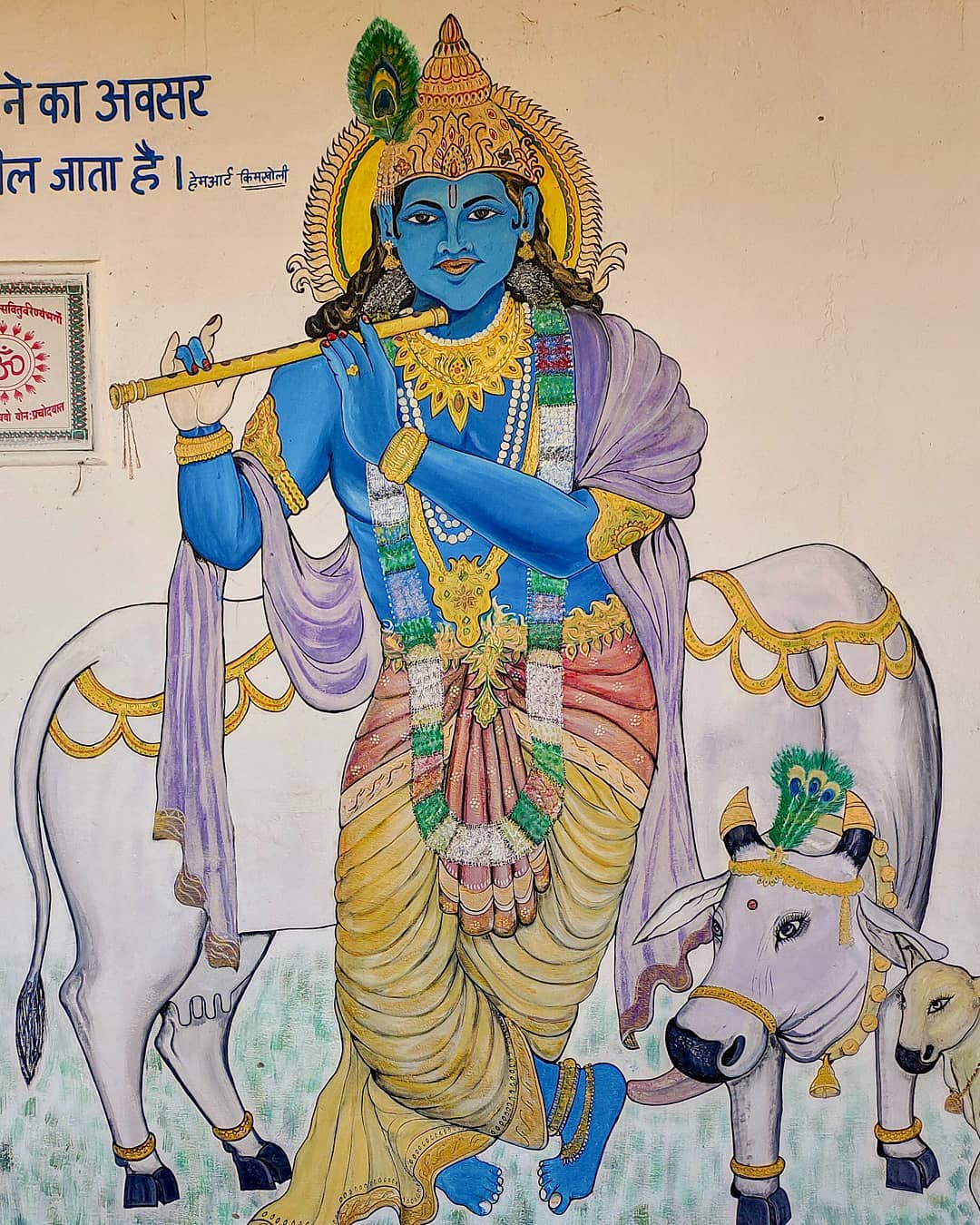

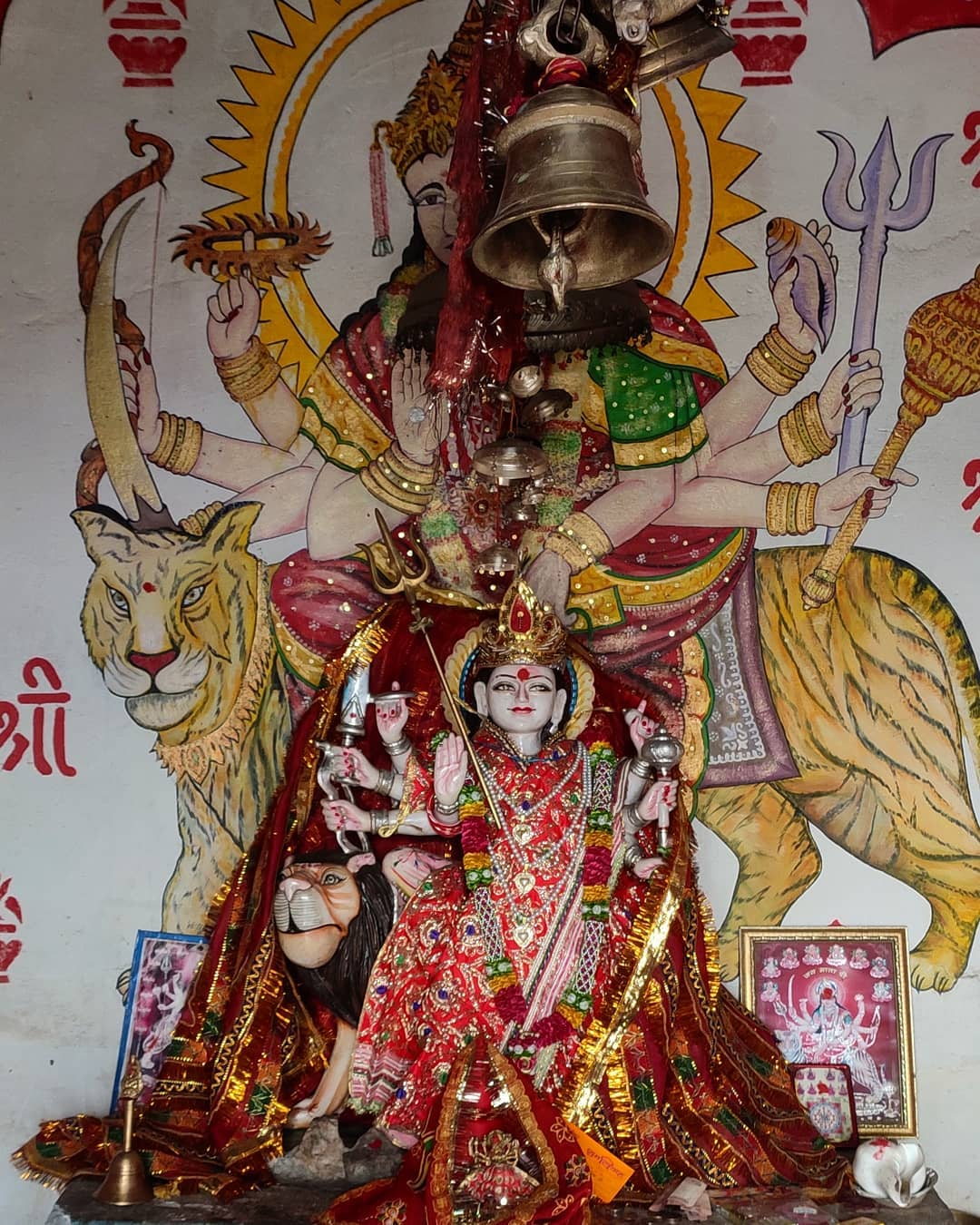

== Demography ==
As per the census of 2011, Isoti has a population of 397.

Population of Isoti
Demography	Percent
Males	48.36%
Females	50.21%
Scheduled caste	1.36%

- Sex ratio:1068
- Literacy:82.1
- Households:82
- Sc Population:7
- Males:192
- Females:205
- The child sex ratio is 957 which is higher than Uttarakhand of 890.
- The sex ratio of Isoti is 1068, which is higher than Uttarakhand of 963.
