= Nayar River =

River in Uttarakhand, India

Nayar Narad Ganga
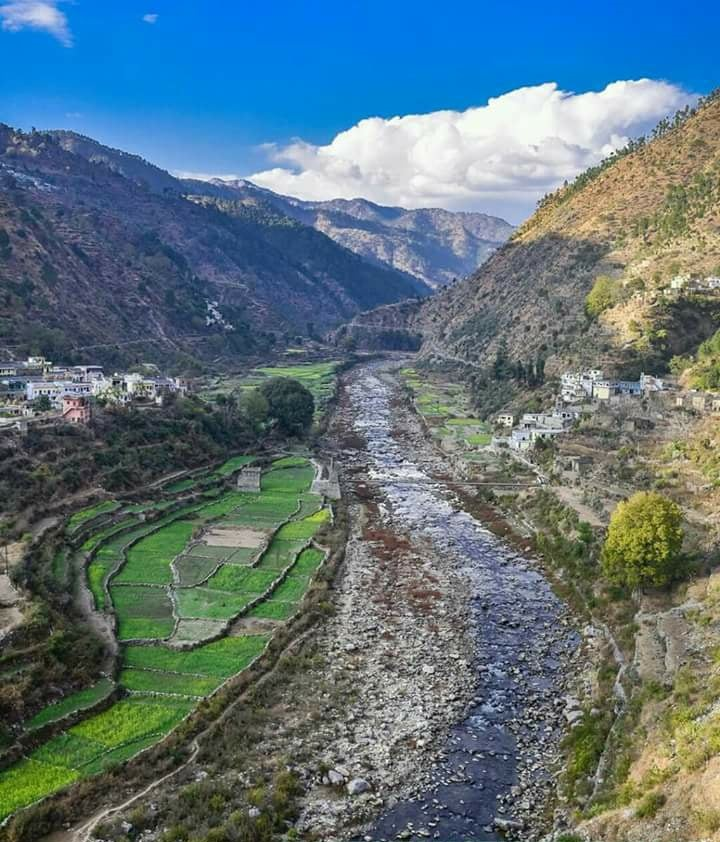
- Fertile valley of Nayar (East) in winter season, near Sera Padinda, Pauri Garhwal

Location
- Country: India
- State: Uttarakhand
- District: Pauri Garhwal

Physical characteristics
- Source: Nayar East
  - location: Dudhatoli
  - elevation: 2,900 m (9,500 ft)
- 2nd source: Nayar West
  - location: Dudhatoli
  - elevation: 2,800 m (9,200 ft)
- Source confluence
  - location: Satpuli
  - elevation: 562 m (1,844 ft)
- Mouth: Vyasghat
  - coordinates: 30°03′50″N 78°35′55″E
  - elevation: 431 m (1,414 ft)
- Length: 100 km (62 mi)

Basin features
- Tributaries
  - left: Khatalgarh Nadi, Sindudigad, Dungrigad, Pasolgad
  - right: Dhaijyuligad, Machhigad, Pharsarigad, Syoligad

Nayar River is a perennial, non-glacial river in the North Indian state of Uttarakhand. The river system is one of the largest non-glacial perennial rivers in the state, second only to Ramganga (West) and flows entirely in the district of Pauri Garhwal. The two main branches of the river, Nayar East and Nayar West along with Ramganga river, rise in the dense forests and high meadows of Dudhatoli and merge to form Nayar roughly one kilometre ahead of Satpuli. Satpuli is a town on the left bank of Nayar East river.

== Etymology ==
As per historical records and ancient Hindu religious texts the river was called Narad Ganga. The present name of the river "Nayar" is presumably derived from its ancient name "Narad Ganga". In its native range, both the branches of Nayar, i.e., Nayar East and West are referred to as Nayar only.

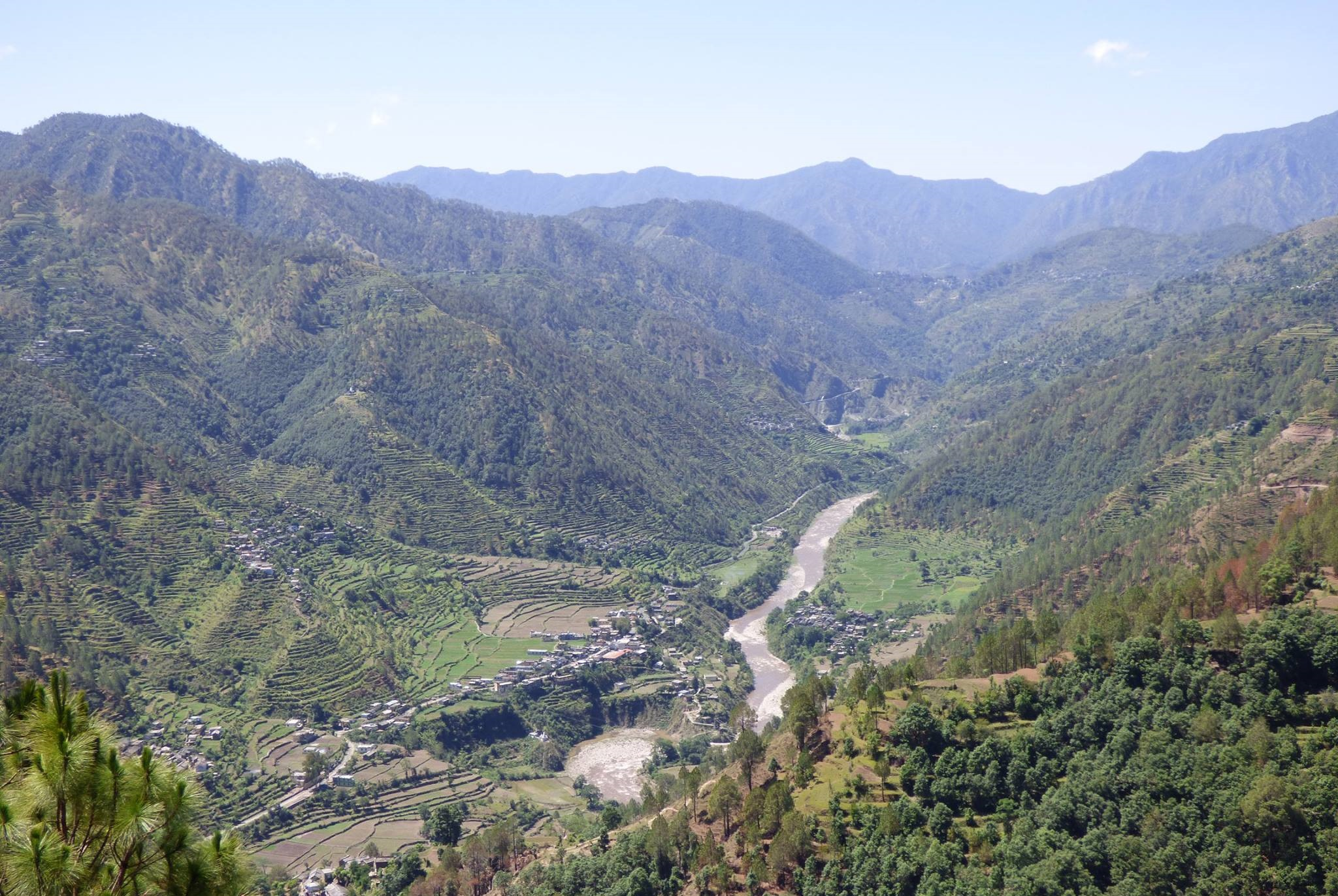
Eastern Nayar near Syunsi Bangar, Pauri Garhwal

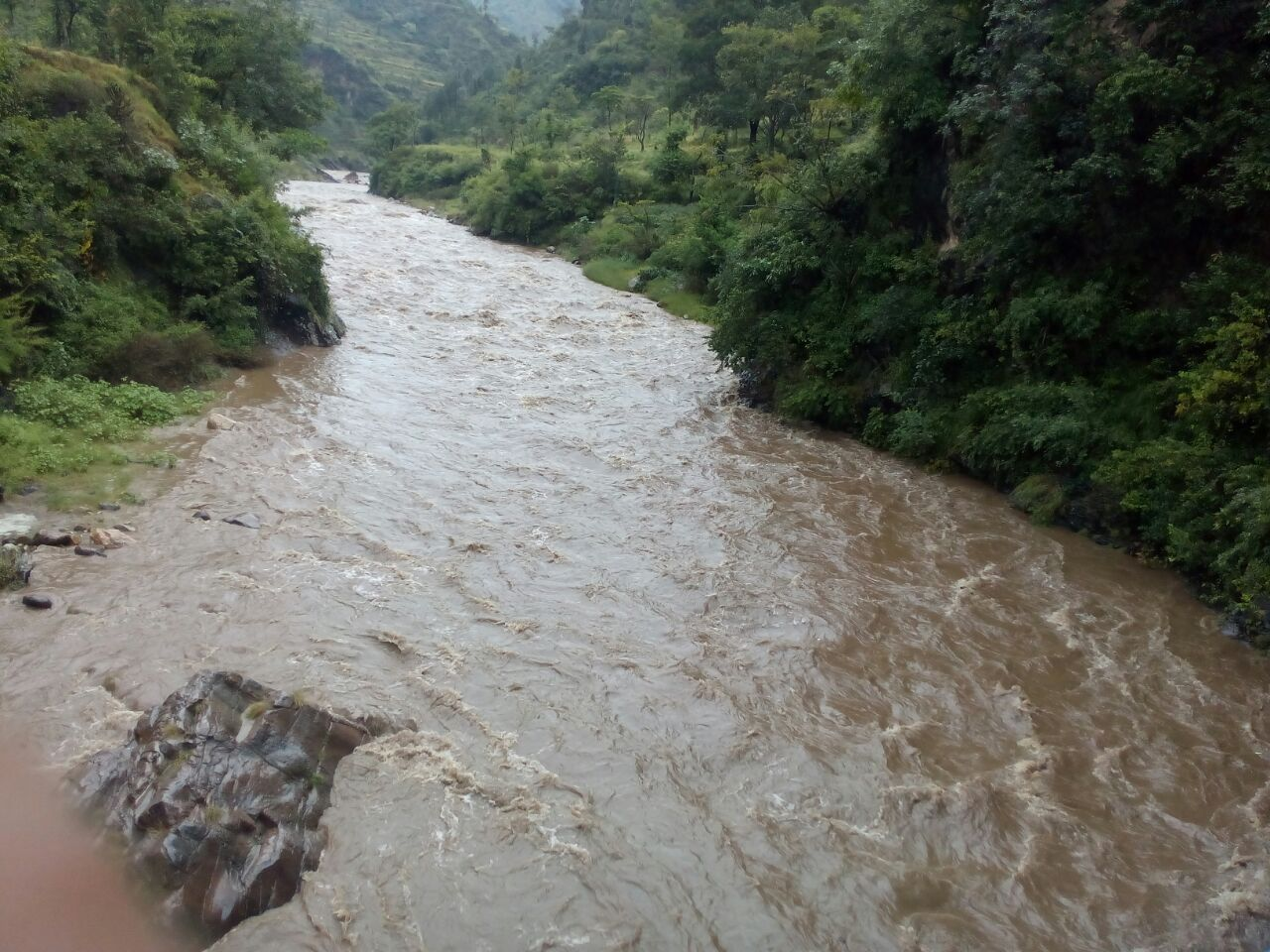
Western Nayar in its nascent stage, close to its source near the base of Dudhatoli hills

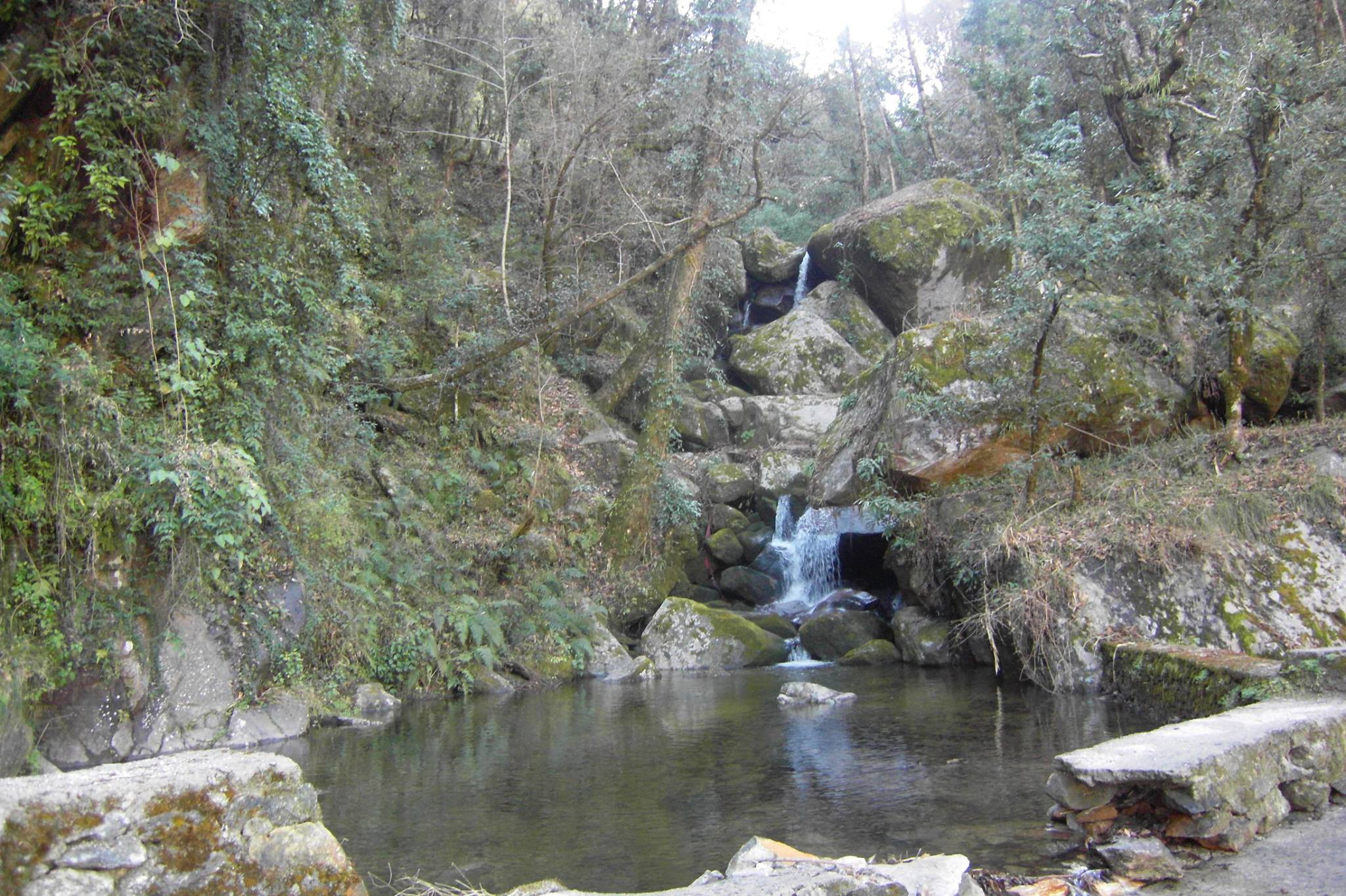
An alpine mountain stream that merges with Eastern Nayar, near Sundargaon, Thalisain

== Watercourse ==
Both the rivers have a combined length of approximately 200 kilometers and are hardly two-feet wide near their respective sources. Although both the rivers are nearly equal in length, the Eastern branch has a higher volume of water as the first half of its course lies in dense forested regions. Nayar East rises in the meadows of Dudhatoli in a high altitude valley sheltered by towering mountains of over 10,000 feet. Several shepherd’s huts are built along its course from its source to the first major human settlement, Maroda village. Some of the great sages are believed to have did penance near its origin. Rishi Chyavana is said to have invented Chyavanprash from medicinal herbs found in Dudhatoli mountains. The river forms an intricate network of riparian systems supporting wild animals and plants in its valley. These shadowed valleys remain snow-bound for weeks. Nayar West rises at a relatively lower altitude and has a lesser catchment area which explains its lesser volume. Since these rivers are non-glacial, they totally depend on precipitation. In days of less precipitation such as winter, the volume of these rivers goes down by up to 50 percent. The water-level gets visibly low during winter season and one can see the river-bed through the transparent water which becomes as clear as air.

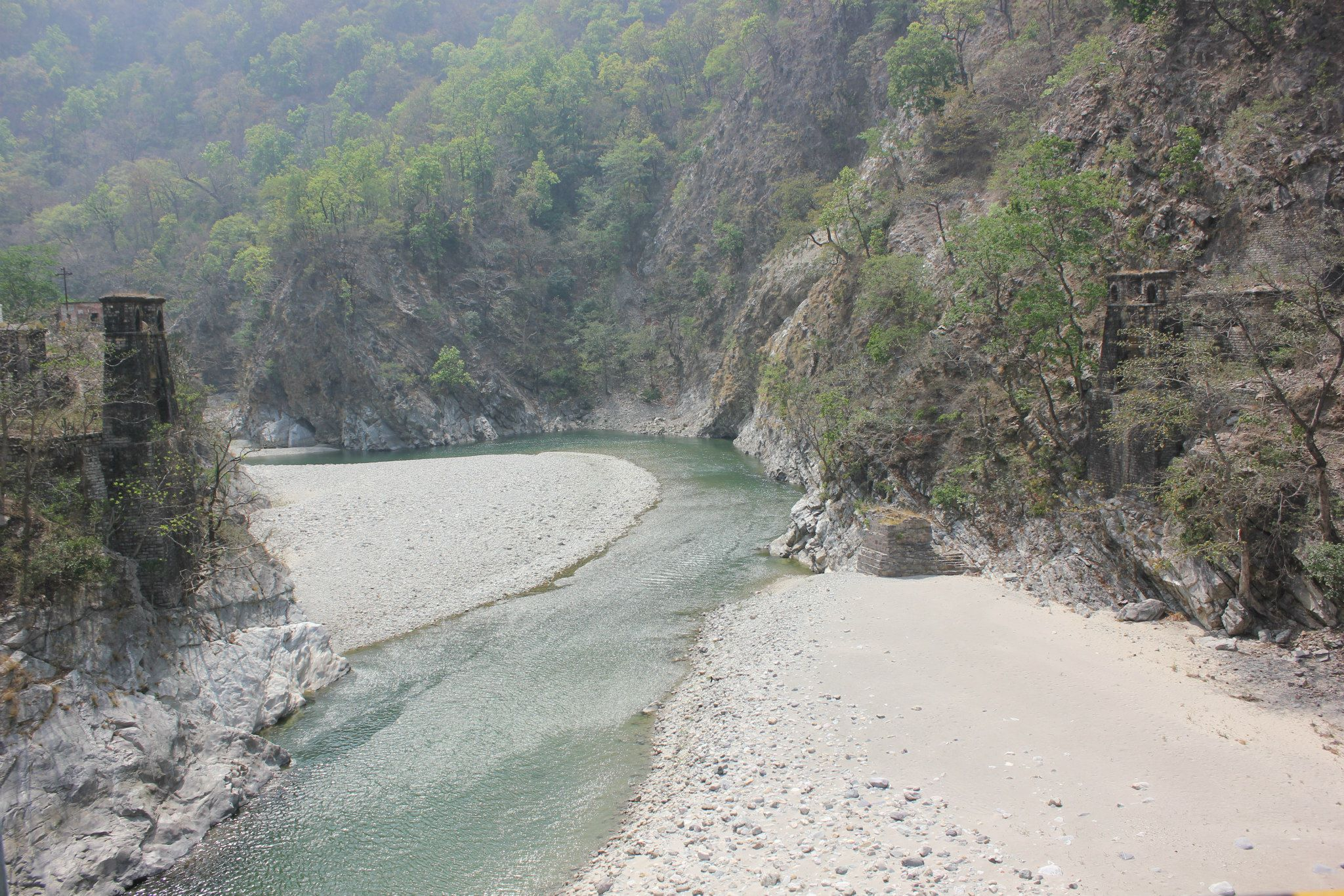
A tributary of Eastern Nayar near Sindudi, Pauri Garhwal

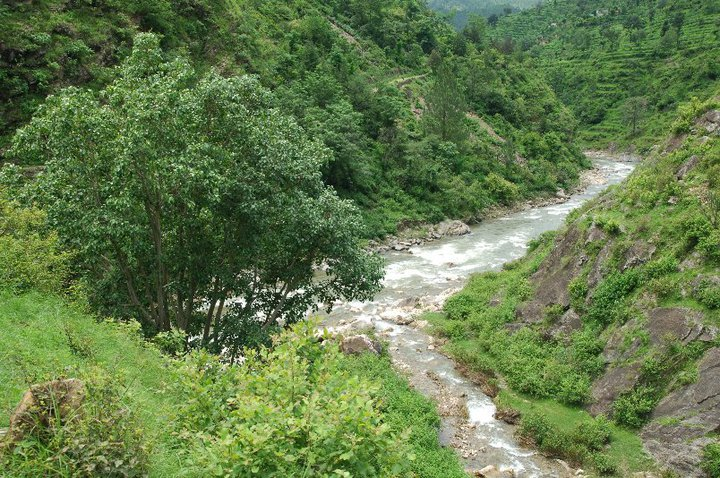
A tributary of Western Nayar near Paithani

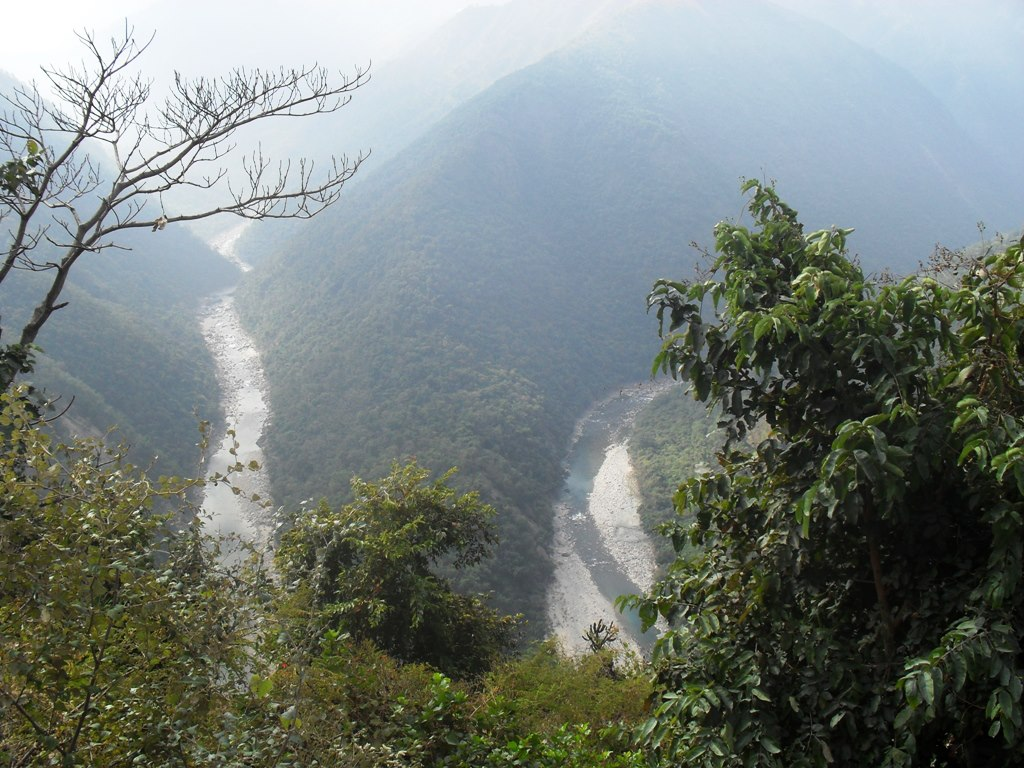
Nayar East river before merging with its western branch

== Hydroelectricity ==
The below mentioned hydroelectricity projects have been developed in the valleys of Nayar East and Nayar West. Their installed capacities (which are understandably low, given the discharge of these rivers) have also been given. Also, the demand for electricity is quite low in these sparsely populated valleys and hence the amount generated is just enough to meet the local demand.
