= Chaubattakhal =

Tehsil in Uttarakhand, India

- Tehsil and Town
- Chaubattakhal Under the Clouds

- Location in Uttarakhand, India Chaubattakhal (India)
- Coordinates: 29.9565°N 78.8782°E
- Country: India
- State: Uttarakhand
- District: Pauri Garhwal
- Elevation: 1,802 m (5,912 ft)

Languages
  - Official: Hindi
  - Native: Garhwali
- Time zone: UTC+5:30 (IST)
- PIN: 246162
- Telephone code: +91 - 01386
- Vehicle registration: UK-12
- Website: pauri.nic.in

Chaubattakhal is a small hill town and administrative centre in Pauri Garhwal district of Uttarakhand, India. It serves as the headquarters of Chaubattakhal tehsil, which forms part of the Pauri subdivision of the district. The town is situated in the mountainous Garhwal region of Uttarakhand. Chaubattakhal is also the name of Chaubattakhal Assembly constituency, a constituency of the Uttarakhand Legislative Assembly.

== Geography ==
Chaubattakhal is situated in the mountainous terrain of Pauri Garhwal district. The surrounding landscape is characterised by hills, forested slopes and scattered rural settlements typical of the middle Himalayan region.

The settlement serves as an administrative centre for the surrounding rural area.

== Administration ==
Chaubattakhal is the headquarters of Chaubattakhal tehsil in Pauri Garhwal district. Administratively, the tehsil falls under the Pauri subdivision. The district administration currently lists a Sub-Divisional Magistrate for Chaubattakhal and a Tehsildar's office for the tehsil.

The tehsil is distinct from the Chaubattakhal Assembly constituency, which is Uttarakhand Legislative Assembly

== Demographics ==
According to the 2011 Census of India, Chaubattakhal was recorded as a sub-district (tehsil) of Garhwal.

== Education ==
The area is served by the Government Degree College, Chaubattakhal and provides higher-education facilities to the surrounding region.

== Transport ==
Chaubattakhal is connected to other settlements in Pauri Garhwal by the regional road network. Its location as a tehsil headquarters makes it a local administrative and service centre for surrounding villages.

== See also ==
- Chaubattakhal Assembly constituency
- Pauri
- Bironkhal
