= Dudhatoli =

Mountain in the Himalayas

Dudhatoli Range
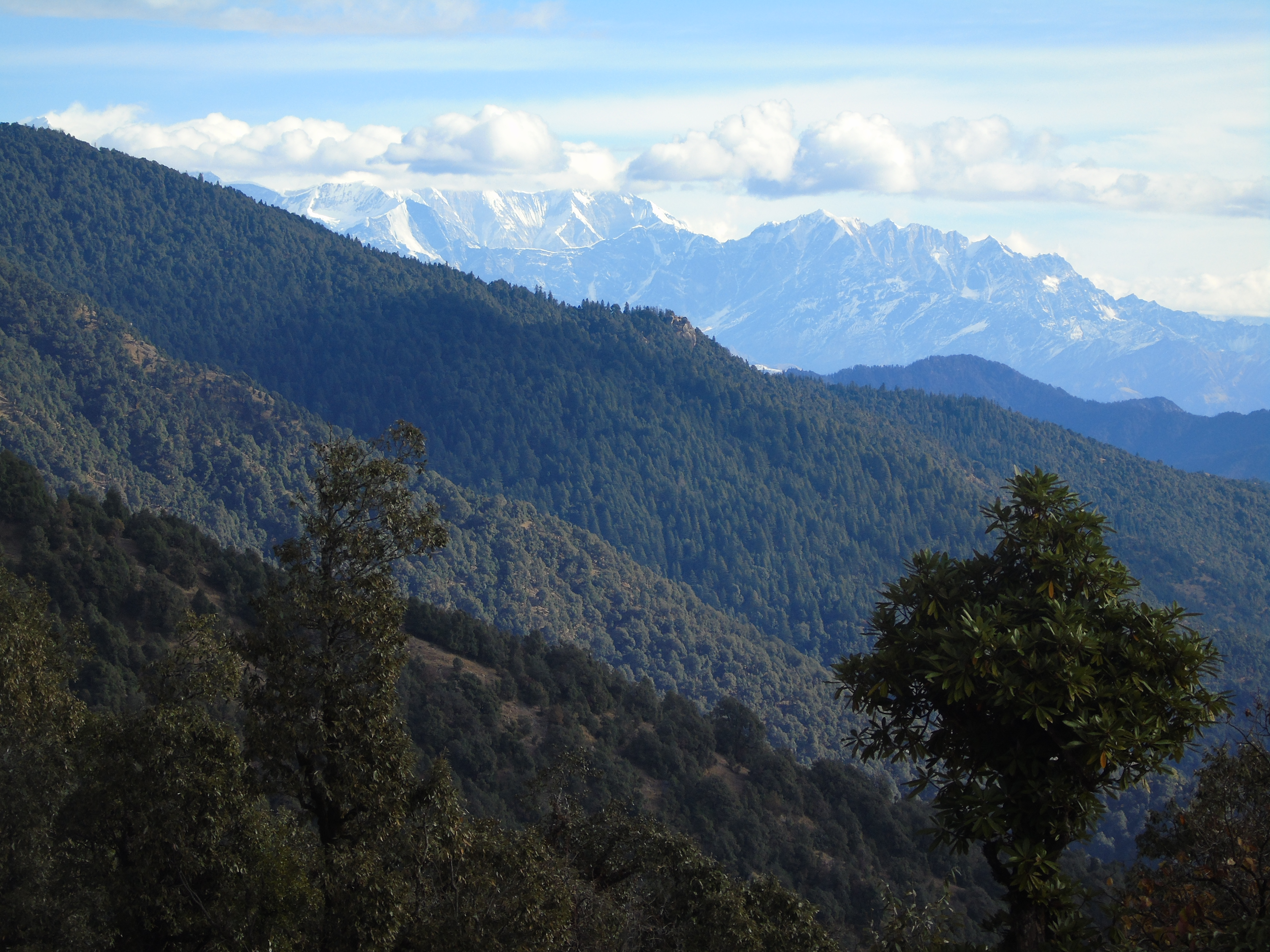
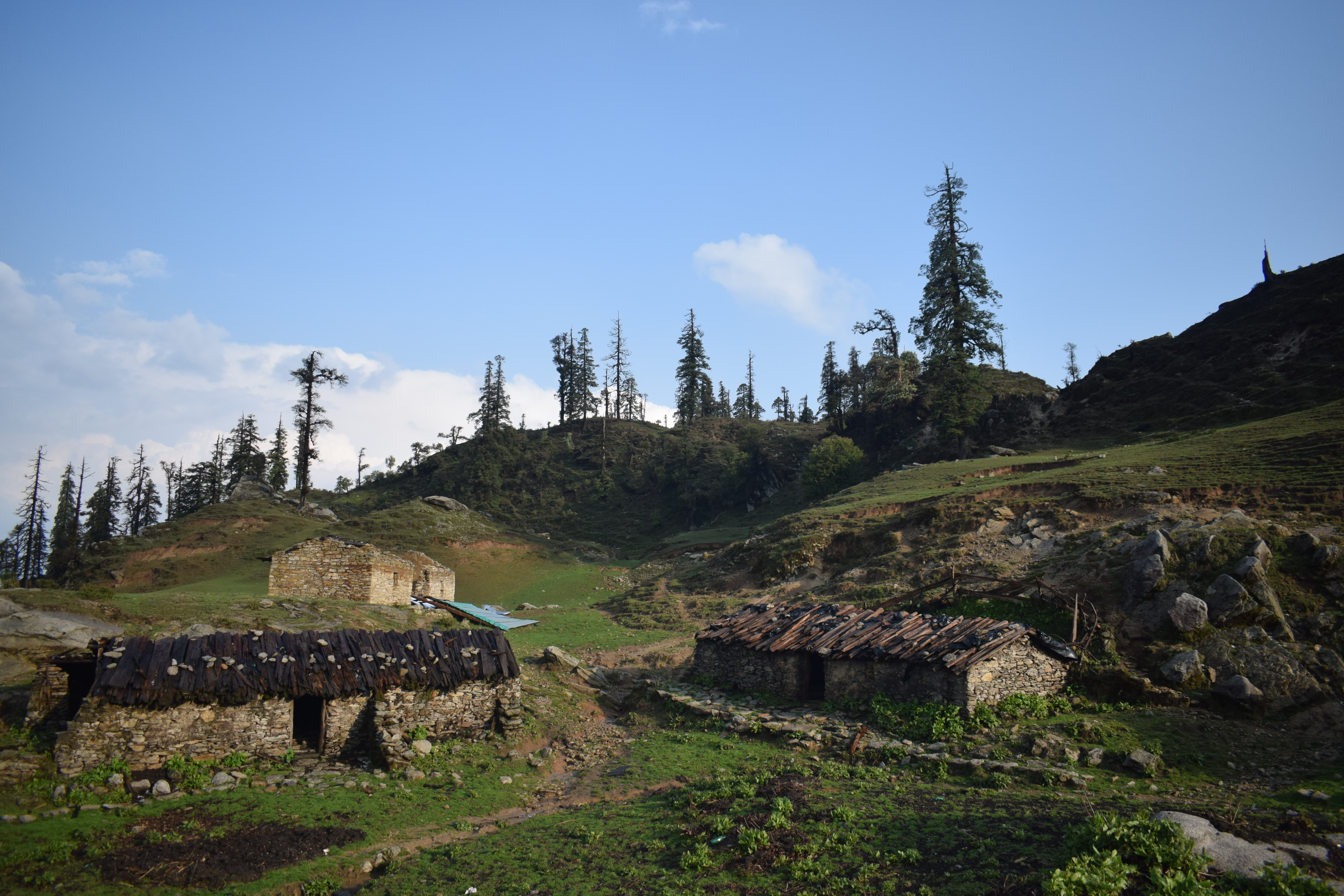
- View of Brahma-dhungi Traditional Chhani (shepherd huts) in Bugyal

Highest point
- Peak: Musa Ka Kotha
- Elevation: 3,114 m (10,217 ft)
- Parent peak: Dudhatoli Danda
- Coordinates: 30°03′56″N 79°11′13″E

Dimensions
- Length: 25 km (16 mi)
- Width: 20 km (12 mi)

Naming
- Etymology: from "Doodh ki Tauli" in Garhwali ("Cauldron of Milk" in English)
- Native name: दुधतोलि डांडा (Garhwali)

Geography
- Country: India
- State: Uttarakhand
- Region: Pauri Garhwal, Chamoli Garhwal
- Rivers: Nayaar (East), Nayaar (West), Ramganga (West), Aata Gaad, Bino and Dhaijyuli Gaad
- Settlements: Thalisain and Gairsain

Geology
- Rock type: Fold mountains from Plate tectonics

Dudhatoli is a middle Himalayan mountain range/forest running approximately 25 km in a north–south direction, starting near Thalisain tehsil of Pauri Garhwal district in Uttarakhand, with Gairsain in Chamoli district being its western limit and Syoli-Khand region in Pauri its northernmost spur.

Some off-shoots of the parent mountain range go as far North as Nauti-Chhatoli-Nandasain in Chamoli, Paithani (Pauri Garhwal) in the West and Mehalchauri/Milchori (Chamoli) in South-East. Musa-ka-kotha, the highest peak in Dudhatoli range, is higher than Nag Tibba (often wrongly quoted as the highest peak in the Shivaliks) by almost hundred metres. The core area of Dudhatoli mountains, known as Dudhatoli Danda has an average elevation of 2900 to 3000 metres (9500 to 10000 feet).

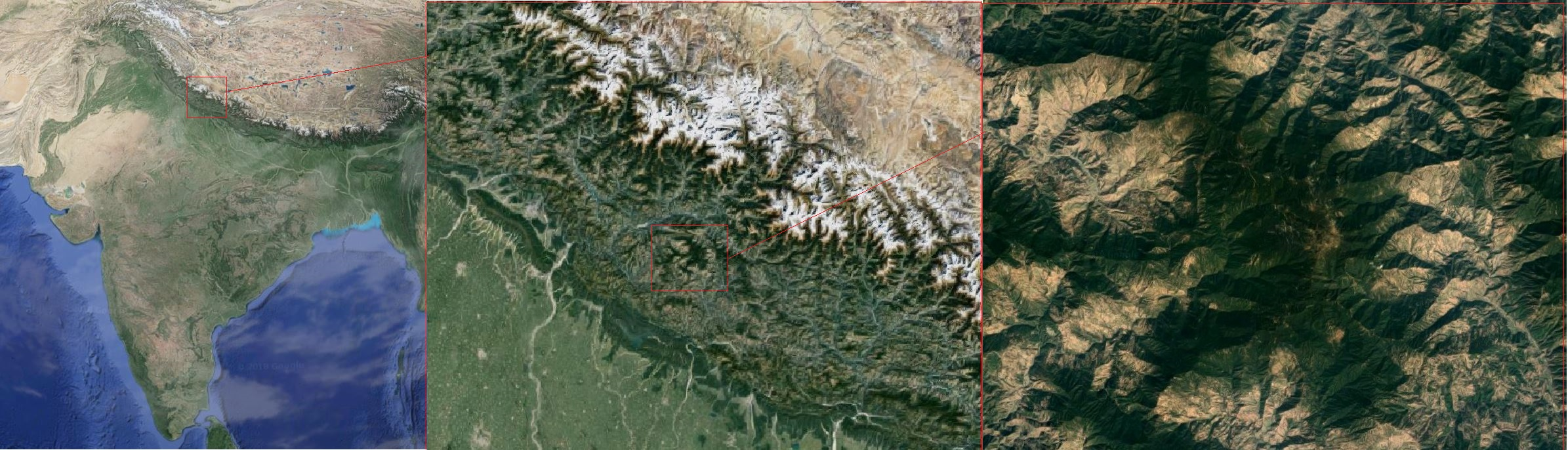
Dudhatoli range, Central Garhwal, Uttarakhand, India

== Etymology ==
The word Dudhatoli is a composite word in Garhwali language made up of "Doodh-ki-tauli" which translates to "Cauldron of Milk" in English. As long as recorded history goes Dudhatoli meadows have been used as a grazing ground for cattle, sheep and goats for hundreds of years. It is the thick, luscious and juicy grass of these giant rolling mountains that produces plenty of good quality milk. The cattle-herders and shepherds further go on to produce tonnes of butter and ghee in dozens of temporary shelters spread across these pastures. There used to be a time when up to 50000 cows and buffaloes were kept in makeshift barns (known as Khark or Chhaanni in Garhwali) scattered all over these desolate mountains. Today, at the onset of summer season, these animal-herders can still be seen making their annual journey up the mountain with their bag and baggage tied at their backs. They get down to their (other) homes at the onset of winter season when grass starts drying up in autumn.

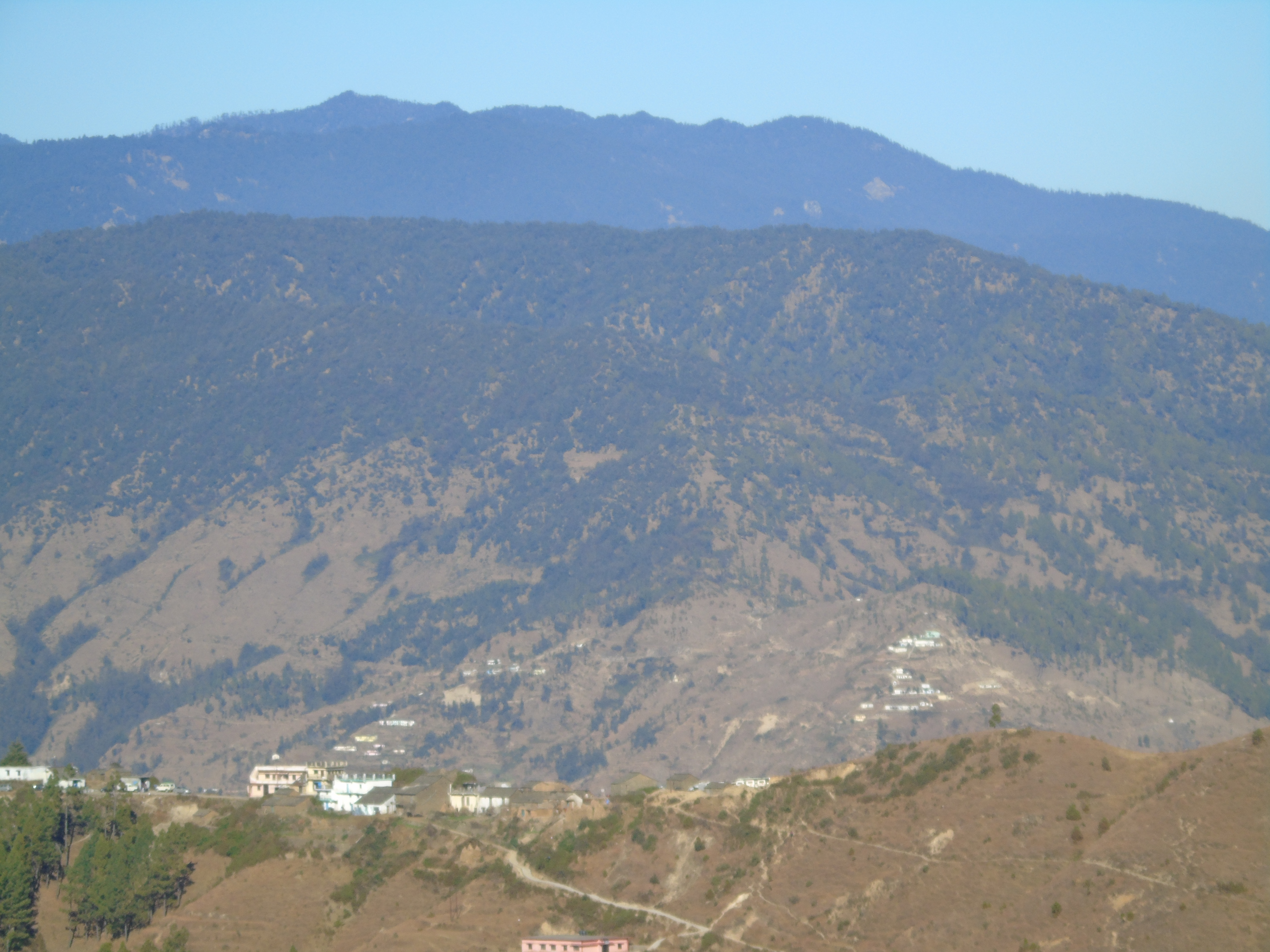
Dudhatoli mountains as seen from Kalinka temple near Garhwal-Kumaon border, Pauri district.

== History, Geography, Flora and Fauna ==
Known as Pamir of Uttarakhand, Dudhatoli has gently rolling mountains and expansive meadows that lie at the geographical centre of Uttarakhand state. In ancient and medieval times, the entire Garhwal kingdom was divided into different Pattis and Parganas for ease of administration; chieftains of various clans used to hold them in the name of the king of Garhwal. Kings have long gone, but the system of Patti (pronounced as pət-ti:) and Parganā is still alive. Today while writing their addresses, people of rural Uttarakhand write their Names, Village, Post office, Patti/Pargana, Block/Tehsil, District and lastly state with zip code. About 60 percent of Dudhatoli region comes in Pauri Garhwal district (the Pattis of Chauthaan, Choprakot and Dhaijyuli), whereas the remaining portion (40%) forms a part of Chamoli Garhwal (pattis of Chaandpur and Lohbha). Higher elevated regions of these five pattis constitute Dudhatoli range. The north-western spur of Dudhatoli range joins the ridge of Hariyali Kantha temple above Jasoli Village in Rudraprayag and Dobri Village in Pauri Garhwal.

Dudhatoli and its surrounding foothills form an intricate network of riparian zones and is home to one of the densest as well as largest temperate broadleaf and coniferous forests in the state. West Himalayan Fir (Abies pindrow), Spruce, Deodar (Cedrus deodara), Pine, Maple, Chestnut, Hornbeam, Alder, Hazelnut etc. are the common trees here. Besides this, many medicinal herbs, shrubs and wild fruits are found here, of which Wild Oregano, Thyme, Galangal, Berberis, Raspberry, Gooseberry, Rose hip, Himalayan Strawberry tree (Bentham's Cornel/Cornus capitata), Redcurrant and Blackcurrant are to be noted. Dudhatoli mountains are source of many non-glacial perennial rivers; Nayaar-East, Nayaar-West (merging with each other at Satpuli) and Ramganga (West) being the major ones, not to mention the innumerable water springs and streams that drain into these rivers (Names of all significant rivers with their headwaters in Dudhatoli have been given in the infobox above).

== Ecological significance ==
Dudhatoli's ecological importance can be understood from the fact that it is the source of dozens of streams and 5 perennial non-glacial rivers. The locals and shepherds have been using the medicinal plants found here, for hundreds of years. While nomads and shepherds are only temporary residents here during warm and rainy months, it is still permanently inhabited by many wild animals such as Leopard, Jungle Cats, Bear, Wild Boar, Porcupine, Wild Antelope-goat (Ghoral), Hare (Wild Rabbit) along with dozens of bird species of which pheasants being the most prominent. As higher elevations of these mountains are snow-clad till late March, the melting snows gently seep into the soil and recharge the water table. By June, rains come in, making the rivers and streams perennial. The moisture keeps the forest and meadows evergreen. However, due to reckless exploitation of forests and natural resources in the 1970s, this region has suffered a lot and is still recovering and rejuvenating its depleted forests and denuded ridges. This creates an illusion, as some of the treeless ridges seem to be above tree-line. But in reality, the highest ridges are close to 500 metres (approximately 1500 feet) below tree-line. Another reason for the declining forest cover is that the seeds of trees are propagated downwards by the action of wind and gravity, unable to sustain the forest stretches on the upper slopes, resultingly the trees on higher elevations gradually die.

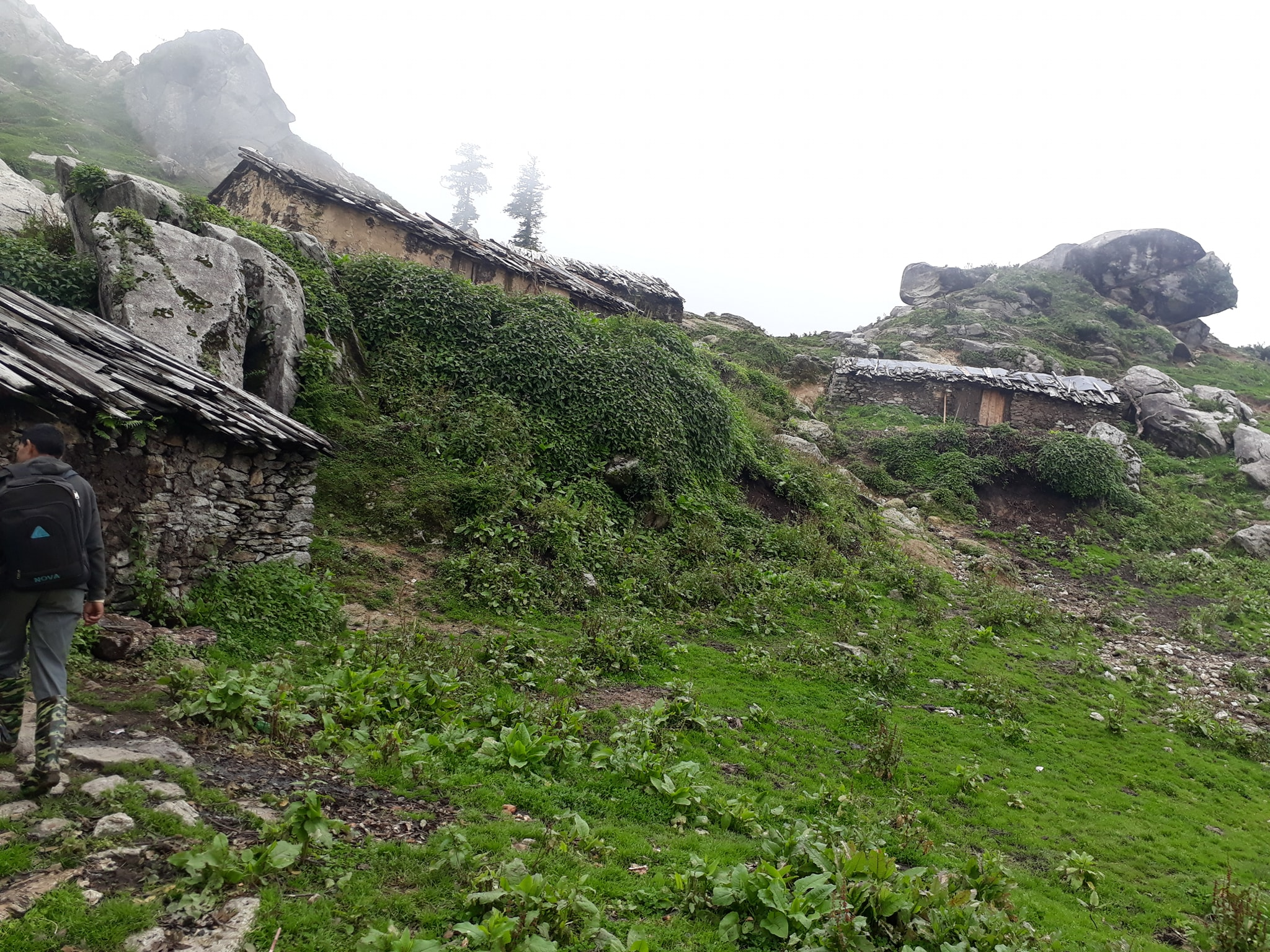
Shepherds' huts in Dudhatoli pastures

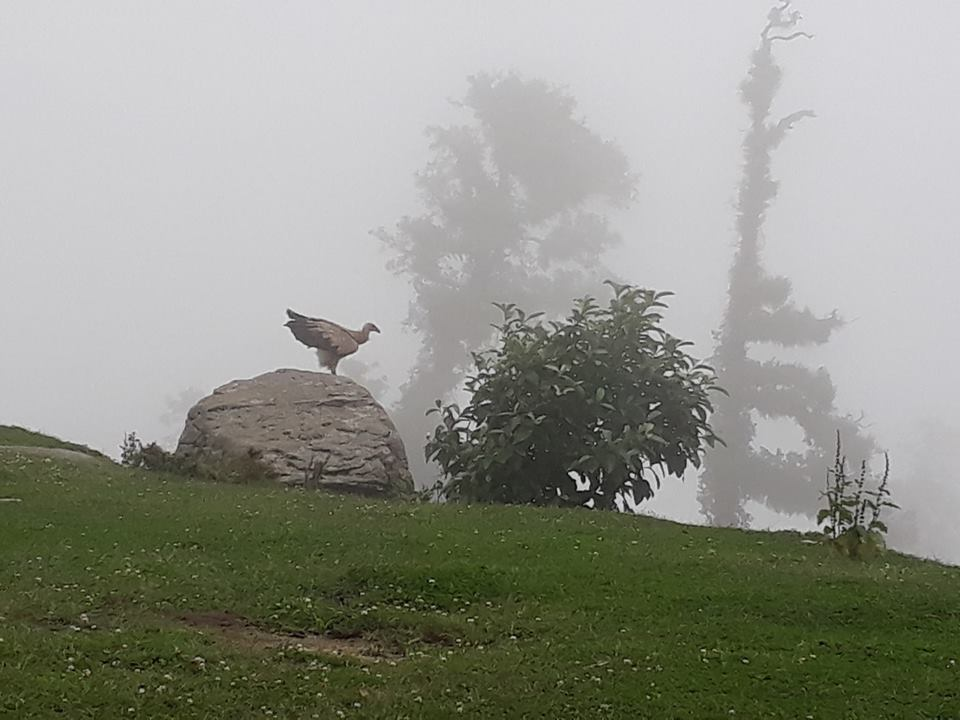
A Himalayan vulture on a foggy day

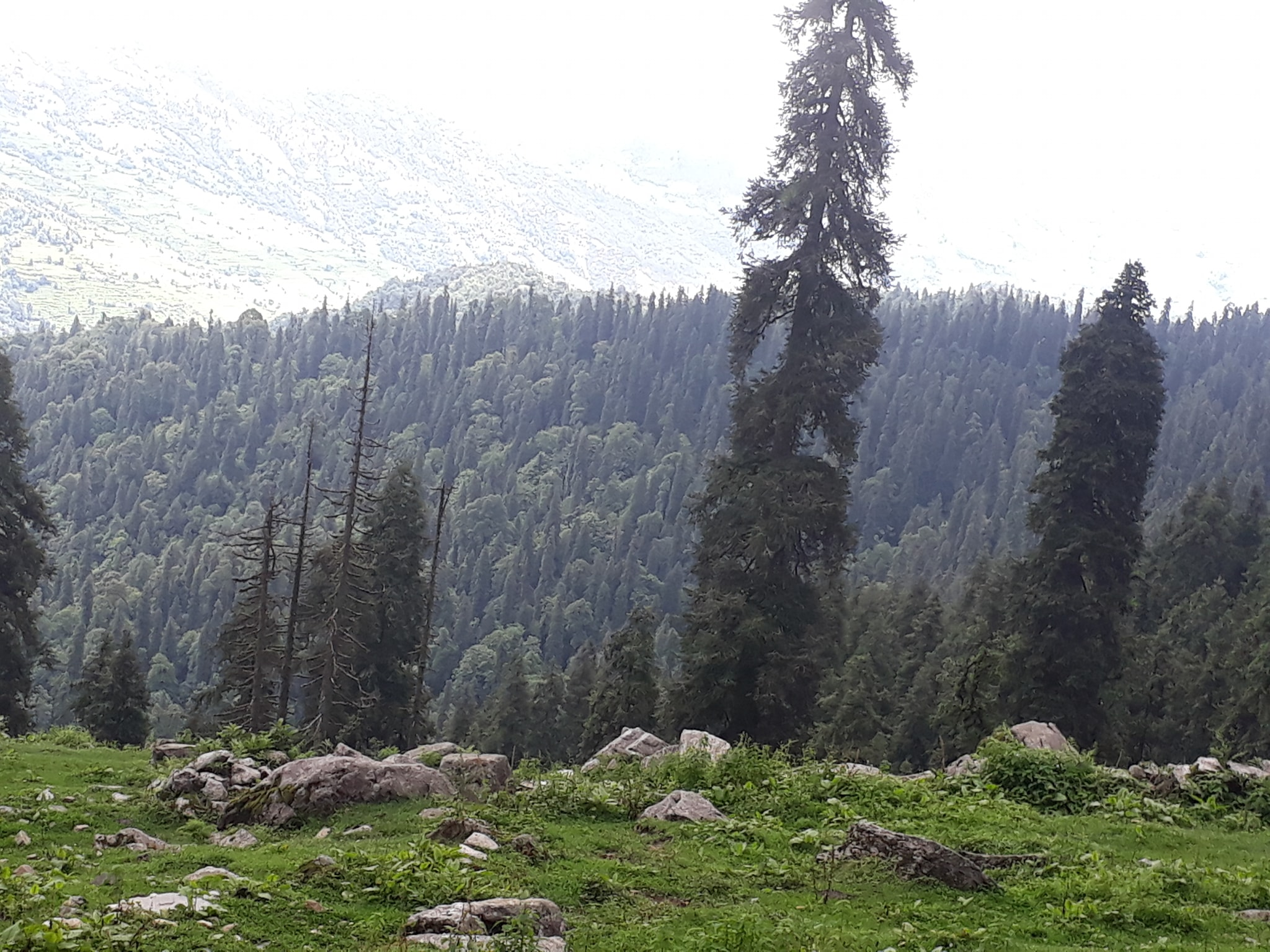
Fir trees of Dudhatoli

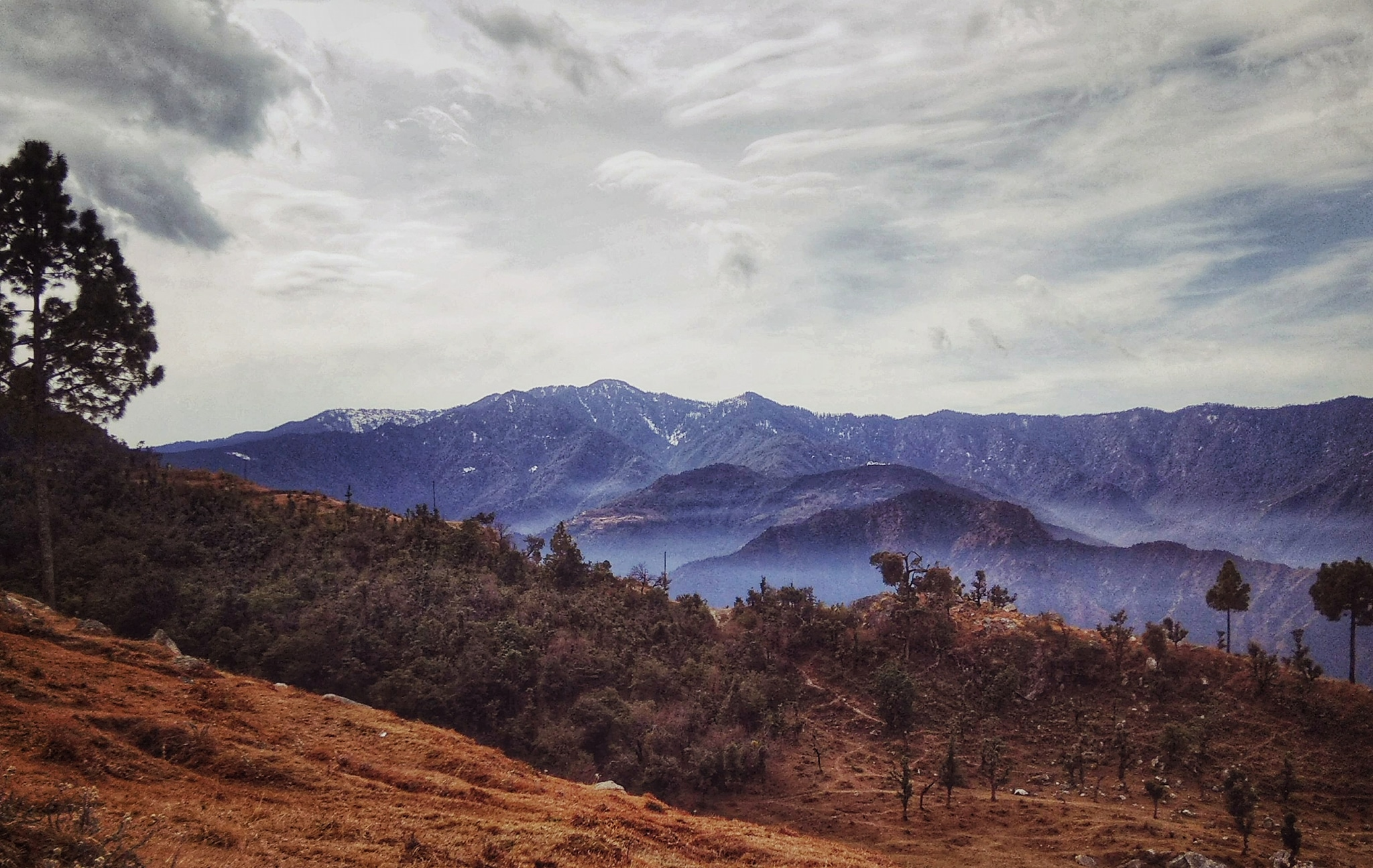
Fresh snowfall in Dudhatoli hills, as seen from Gairsain

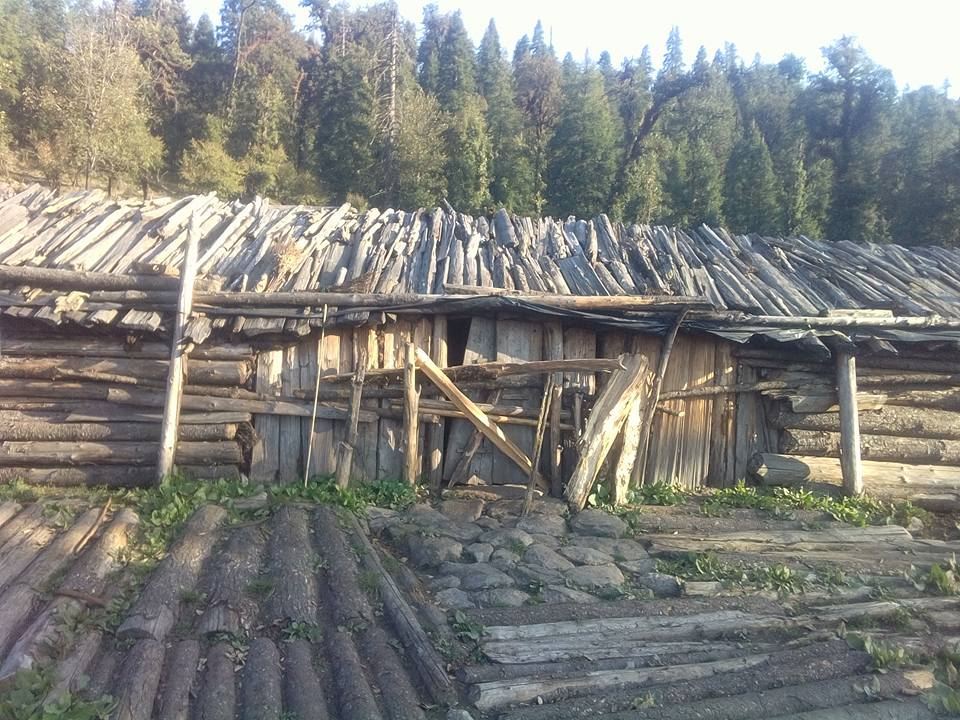
A typical shepherd's hut or Khark in Dudhatoli

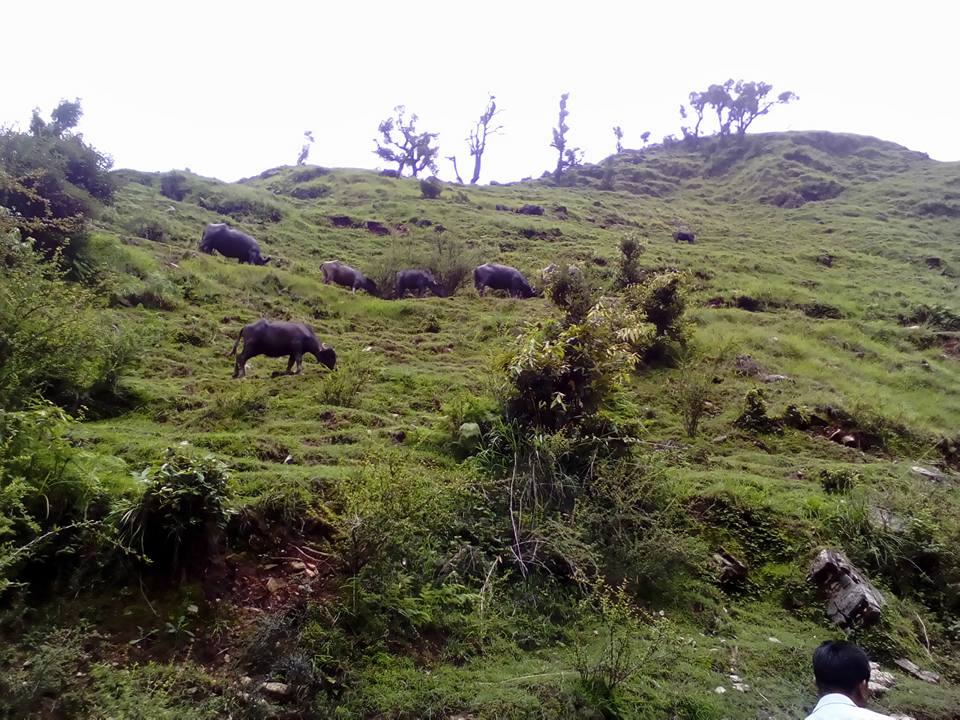
Buffaloes grazing in Dudhatoli

== Climate ==
It has a temperate climate in summer with temperature hovering between 15 and 25 degrees Celsius. However, it gets bitter cold in winter with subzero temperatures not uncommon, as is typical of all the middle-Himalayan mountains and meadows. It receives heavy snowfall in the months of December to March and is the first place to get snow in the district. Sometimes, snow can be seen in cold and shadowy spots till late March or early April.

== How to Reach ==
Dudhatoli can be approached from Thalisain in Pauri Garhwal (NH 121) and Gairsain (NH 87) in Chamoli Garhwal. While coming from Thalisain side, people get down at Peethsain (22 kilometres from Thalisain) and reach Dudhatoli after a trek of about 24 kilometres. The other route is much shorter albeit steeper, which goes from Gairsain to Bharadisain (the site of Uttarakhand Vidhan Sabha) and then 10 to 12 kilometres of steep trekking. Trekking begins from bharadsain cause end point of road is in there. Bharadisain(vidhan sabha) is near to Gairsain (Summer Capital of Uttarakhand).

== Image gallery ==
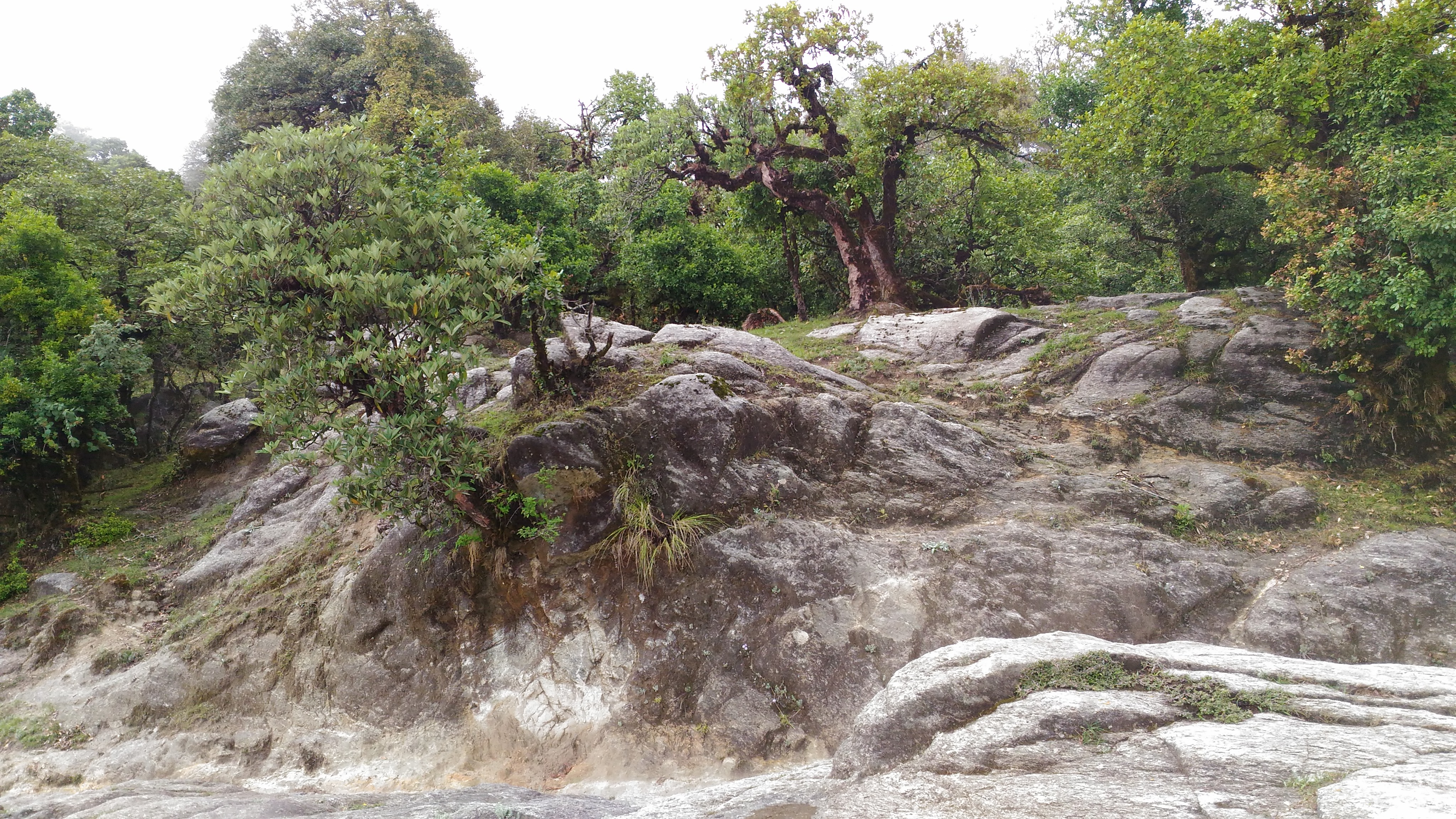
An old growth forest of oak, maple and Rhododendrons near Peethsain in Dudhatoli mountains

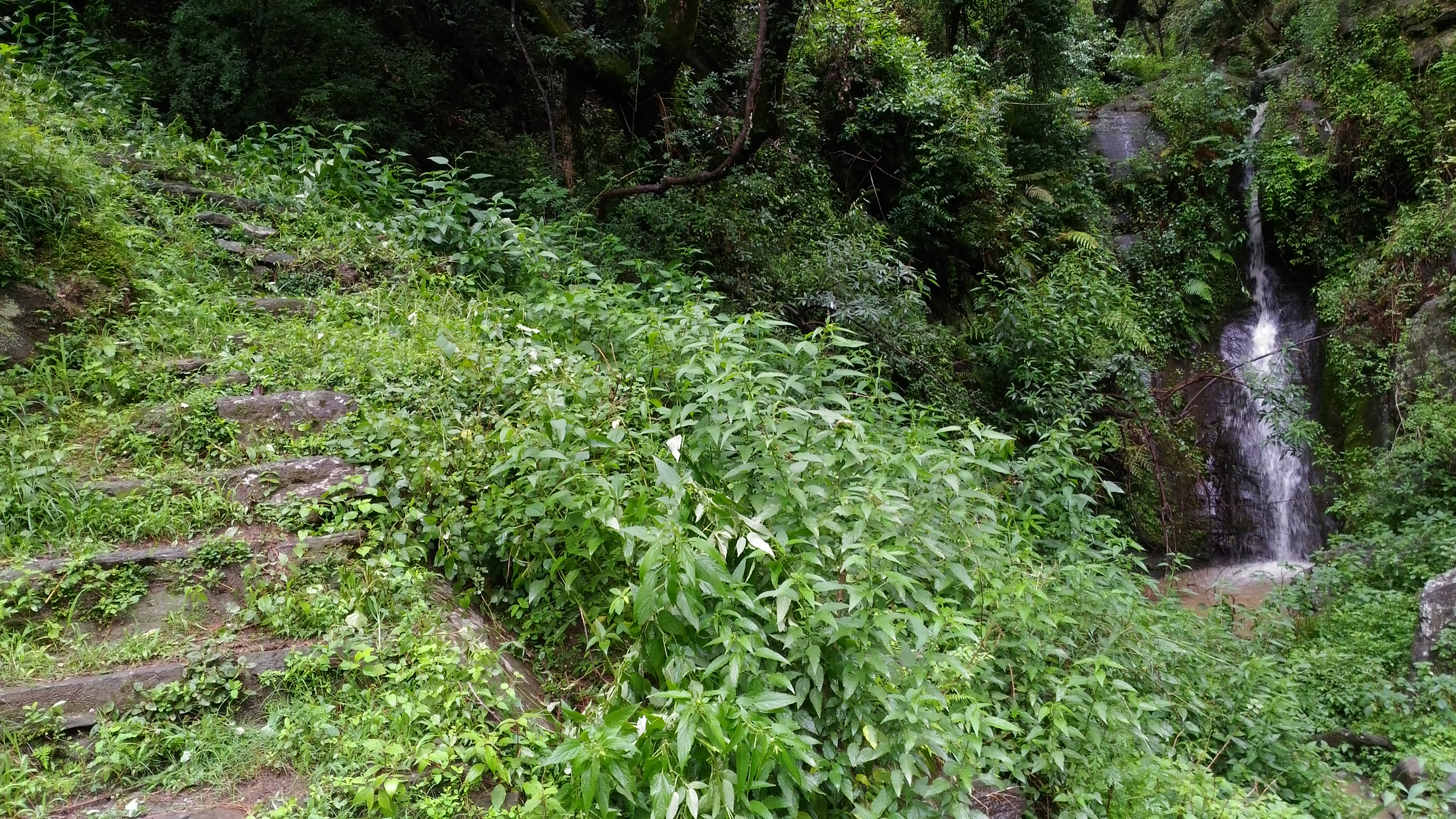
Rock-hewn stairs leading to a village near Thalisain. Freshwater springs are abundant in the region.

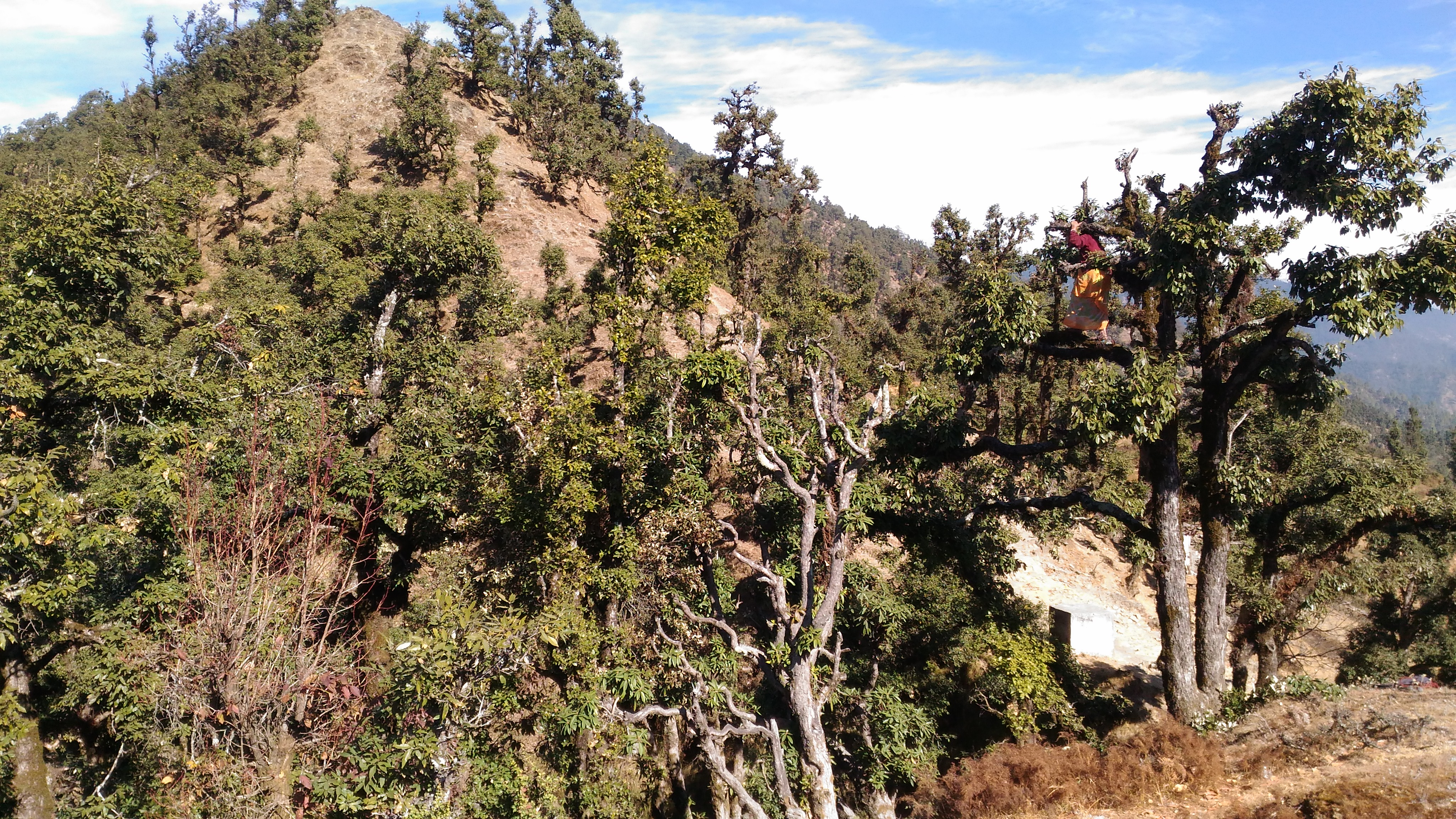
Lopping of oak trees (to be used as fodder).

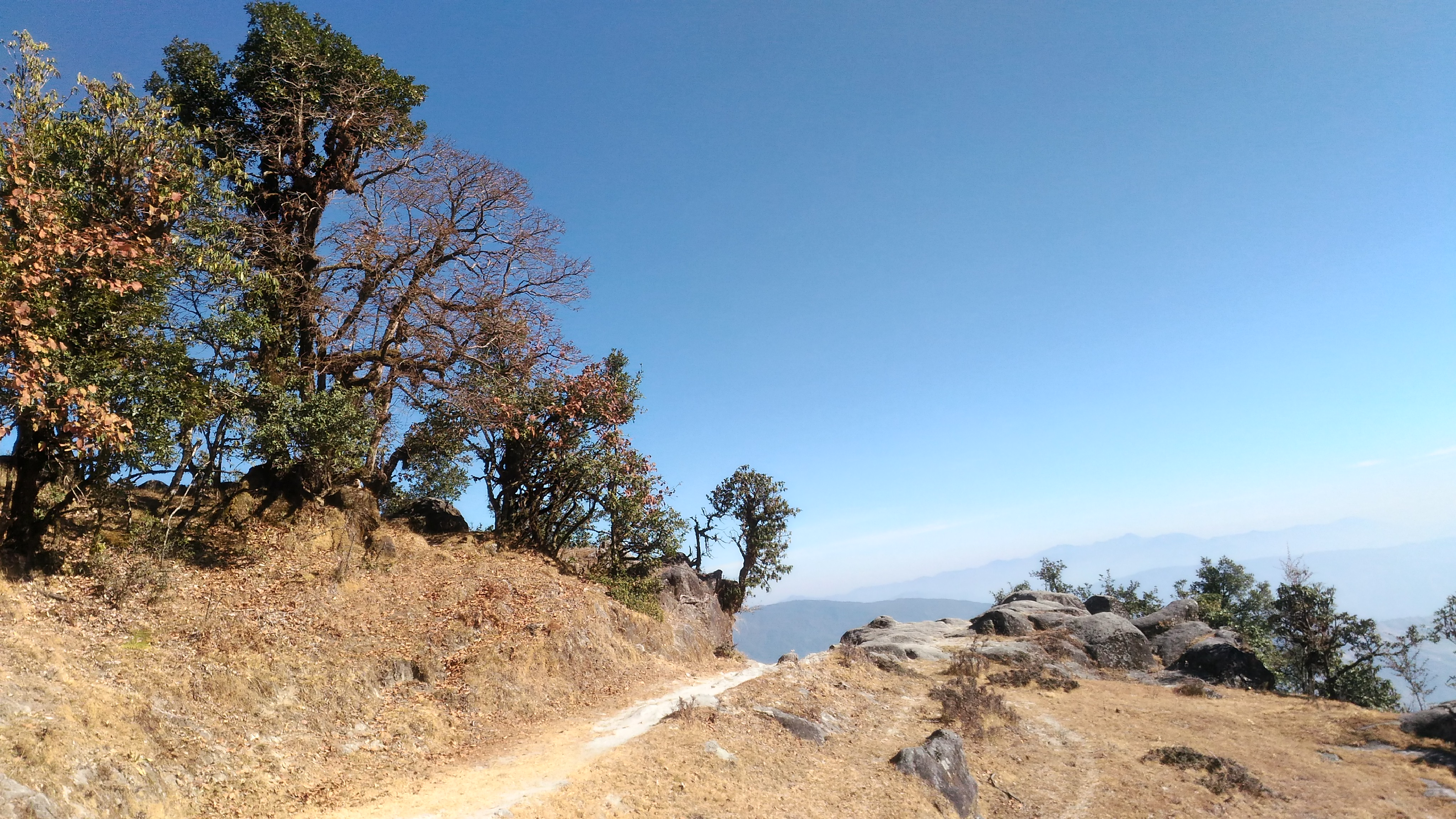
An amazing viewpoint halfway between Peethsain and Binsar temple, in Dudhatoli mountains

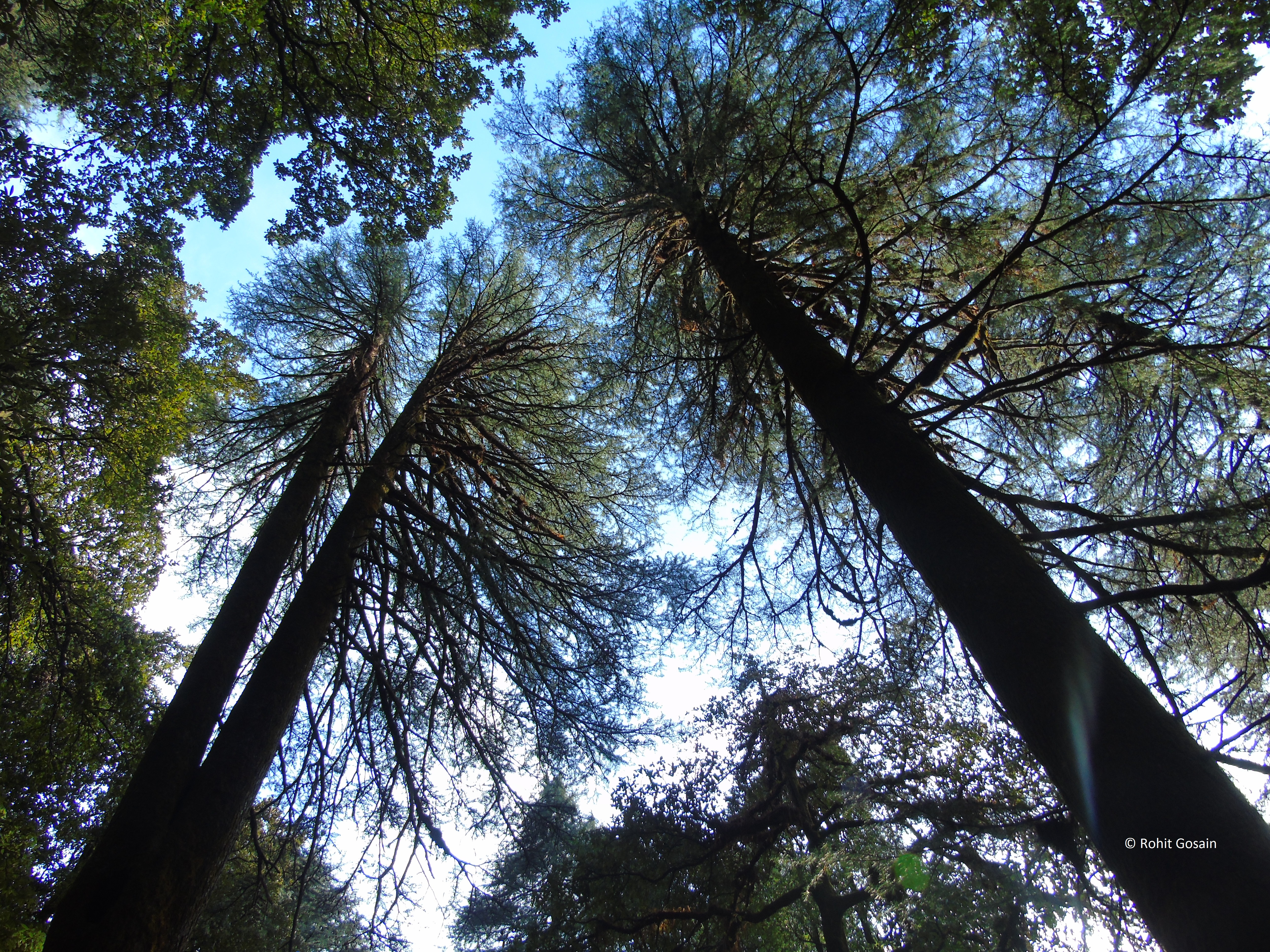
Giant Deodars of Binsar Mahadev, in Chauthaan region of Pauri Garhwal.

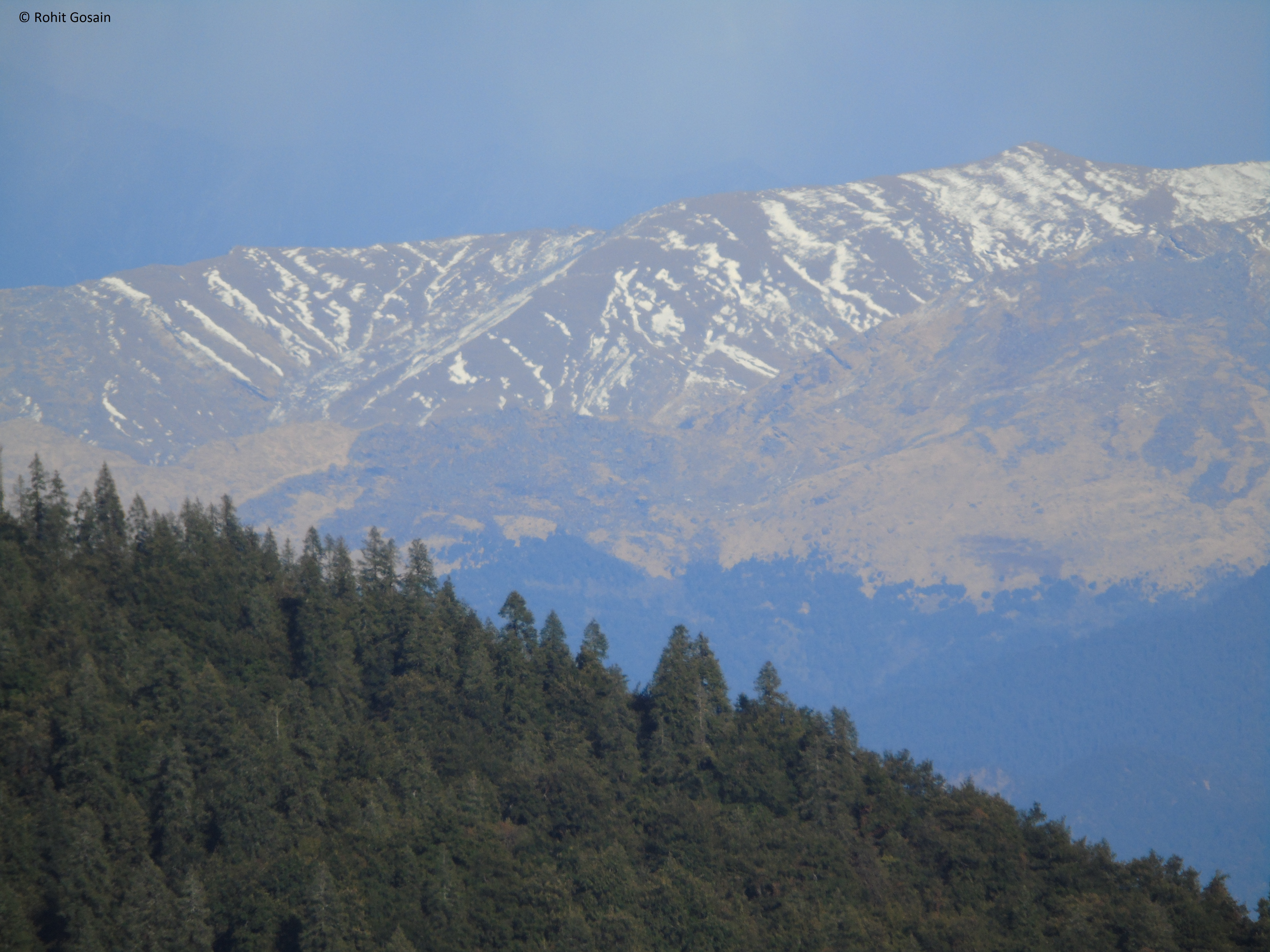
Bugyals (meadows) of Chamoli (as seen from Brahma-dhungi, Pauri Garhwal).

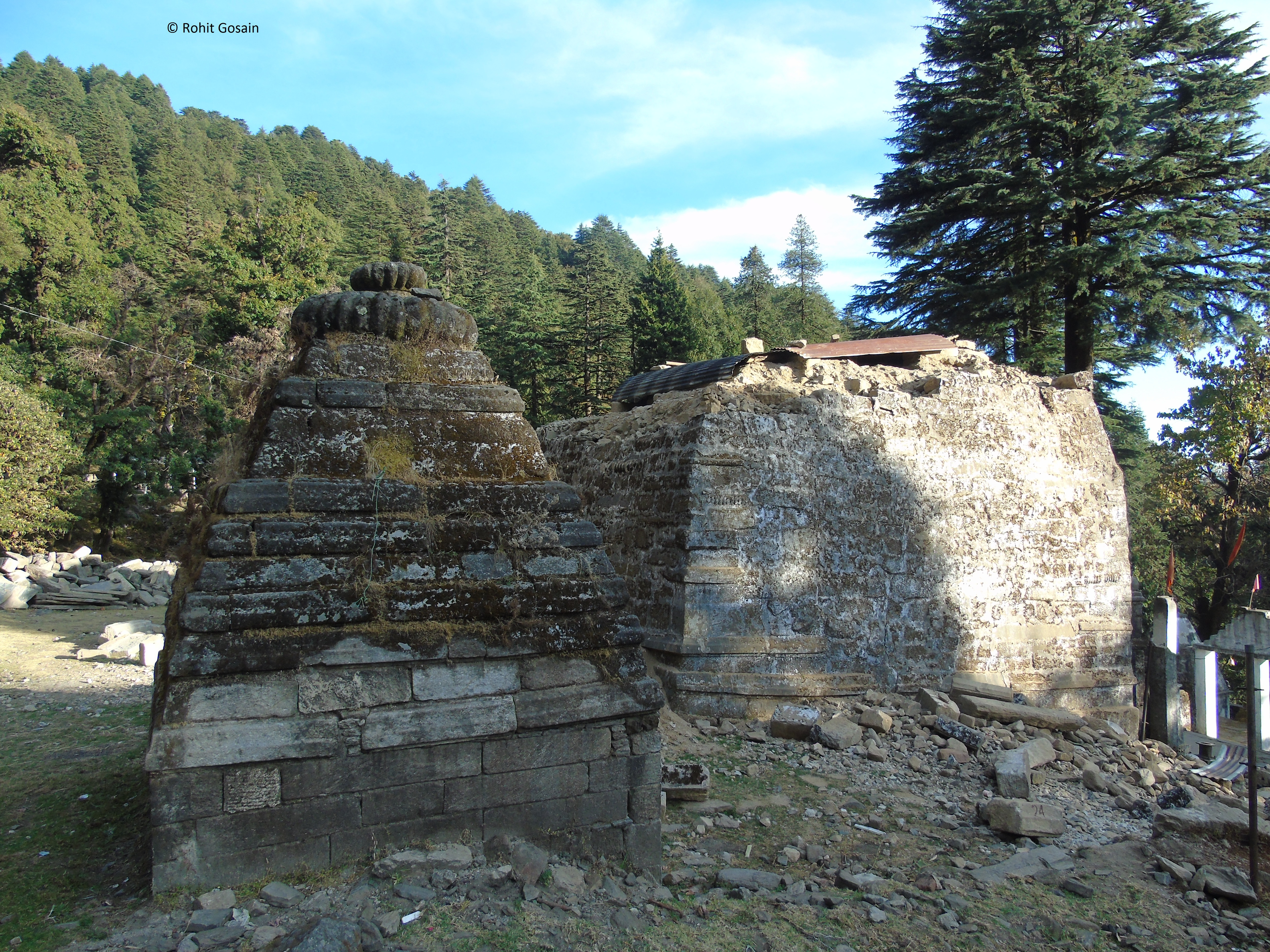
The ancient temple of Bindeshwar Mahadev in the foothills of Dudhatoli (history unknown, probably 12th to 15th century AD). Demolished in October 2017.

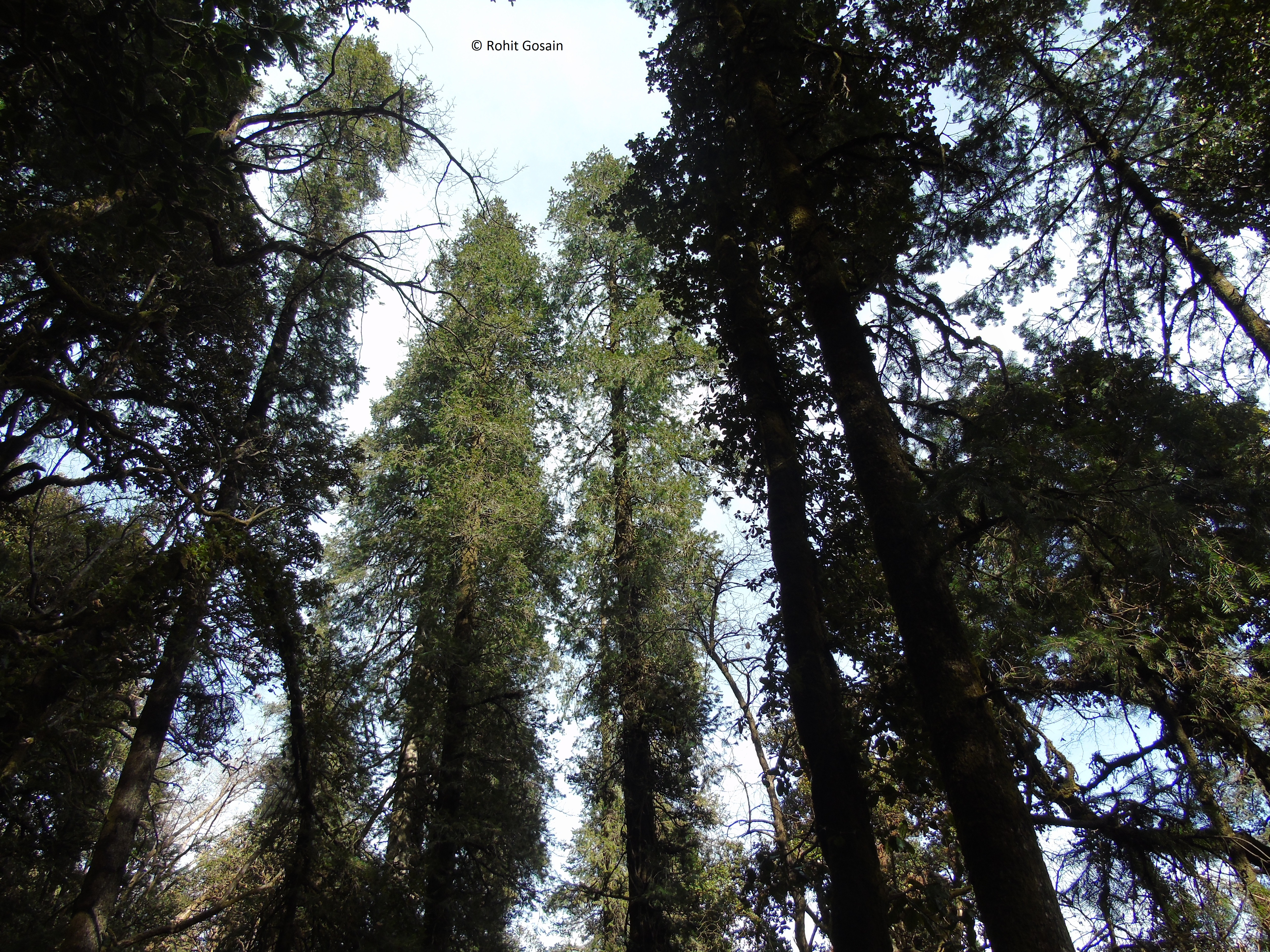
Gigantic West Himalayan Fir trees, Known as Raansal or Rasuli in Garhwali language.

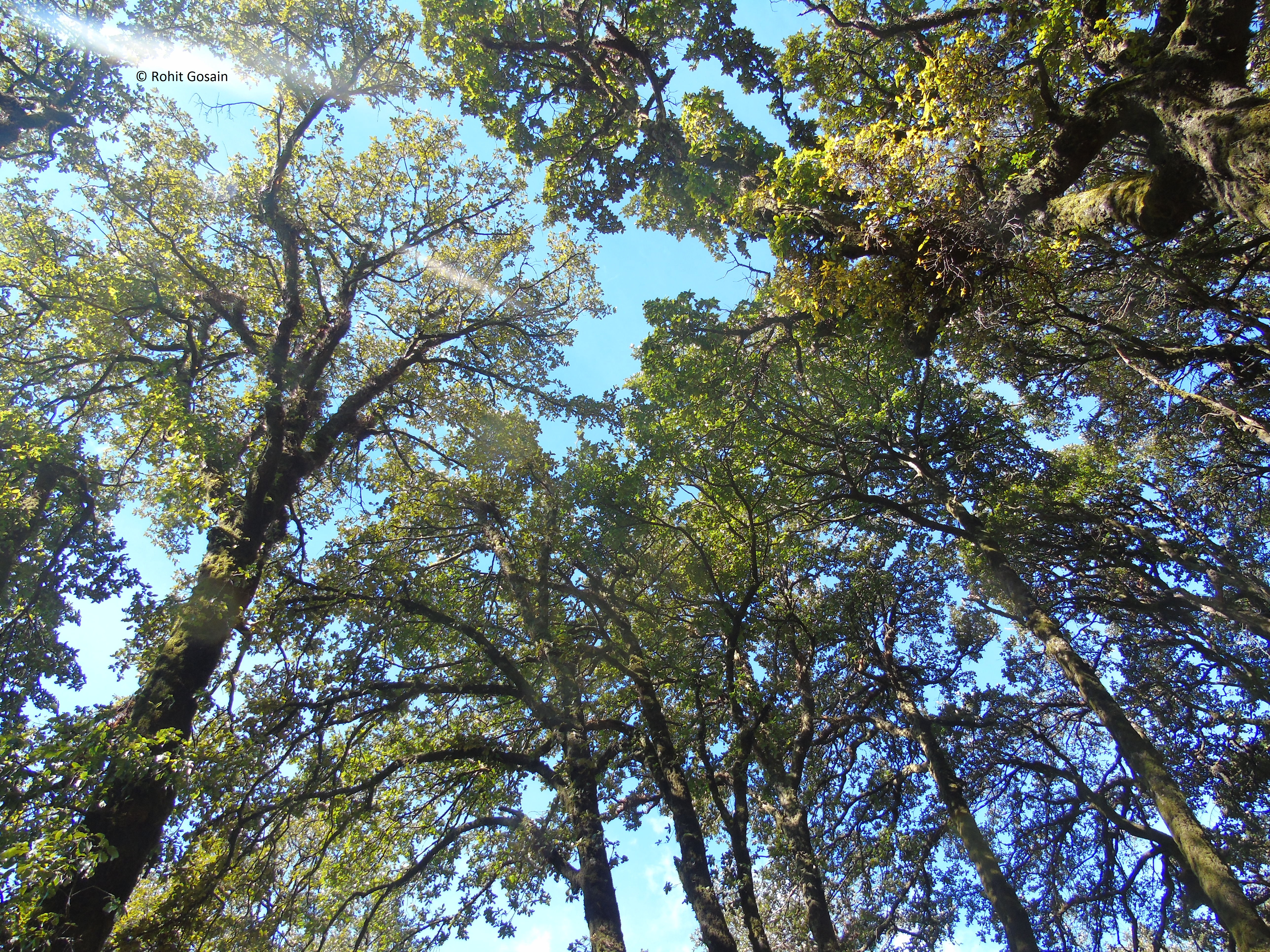
Sunlight passing through ancient and gnarled oak trees, Dudhatoli. These trees are hundreds of years old, many of them being more than 100 feet tall

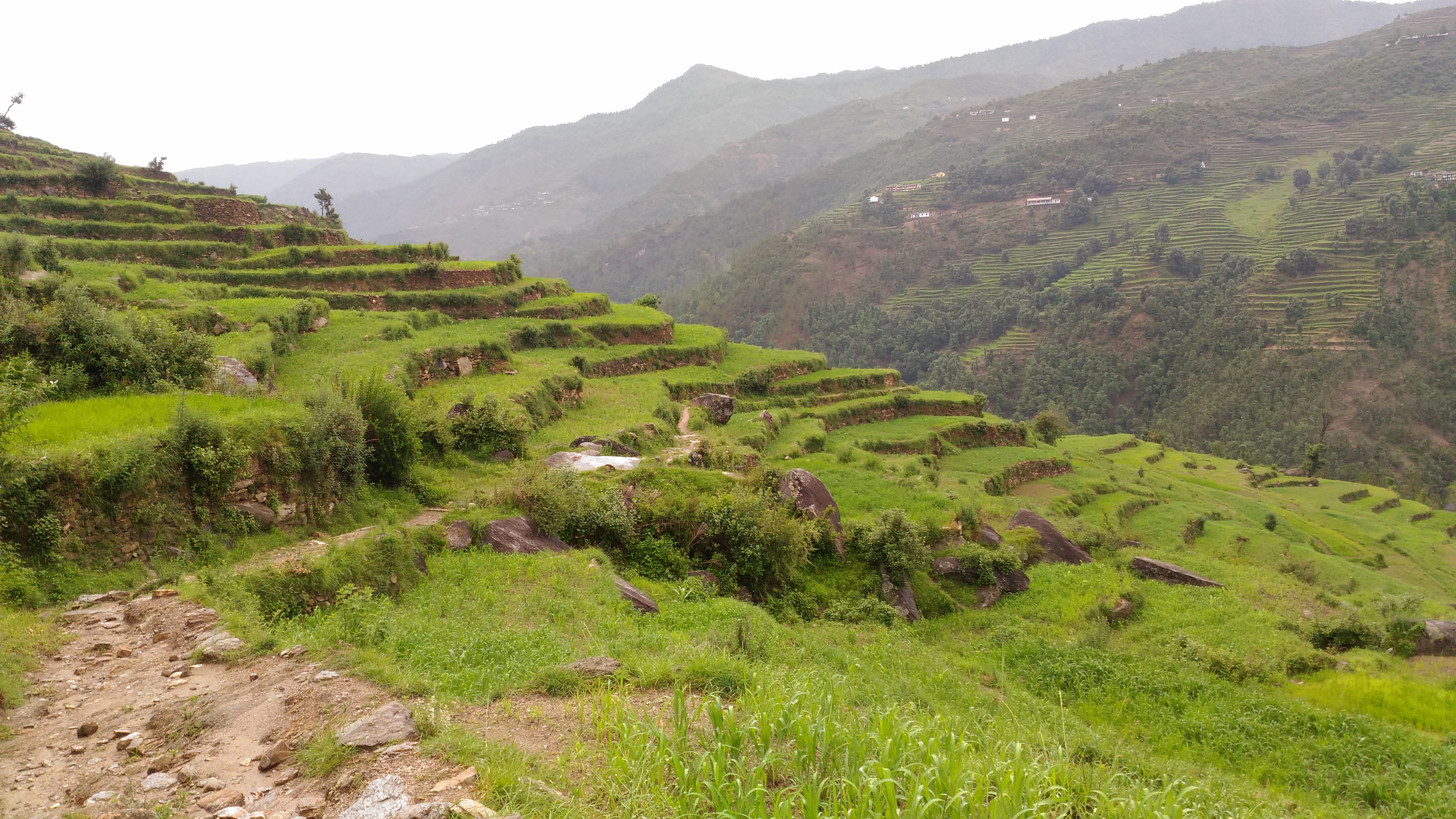
A bridle path towards Bindeshwar Mahadev temple

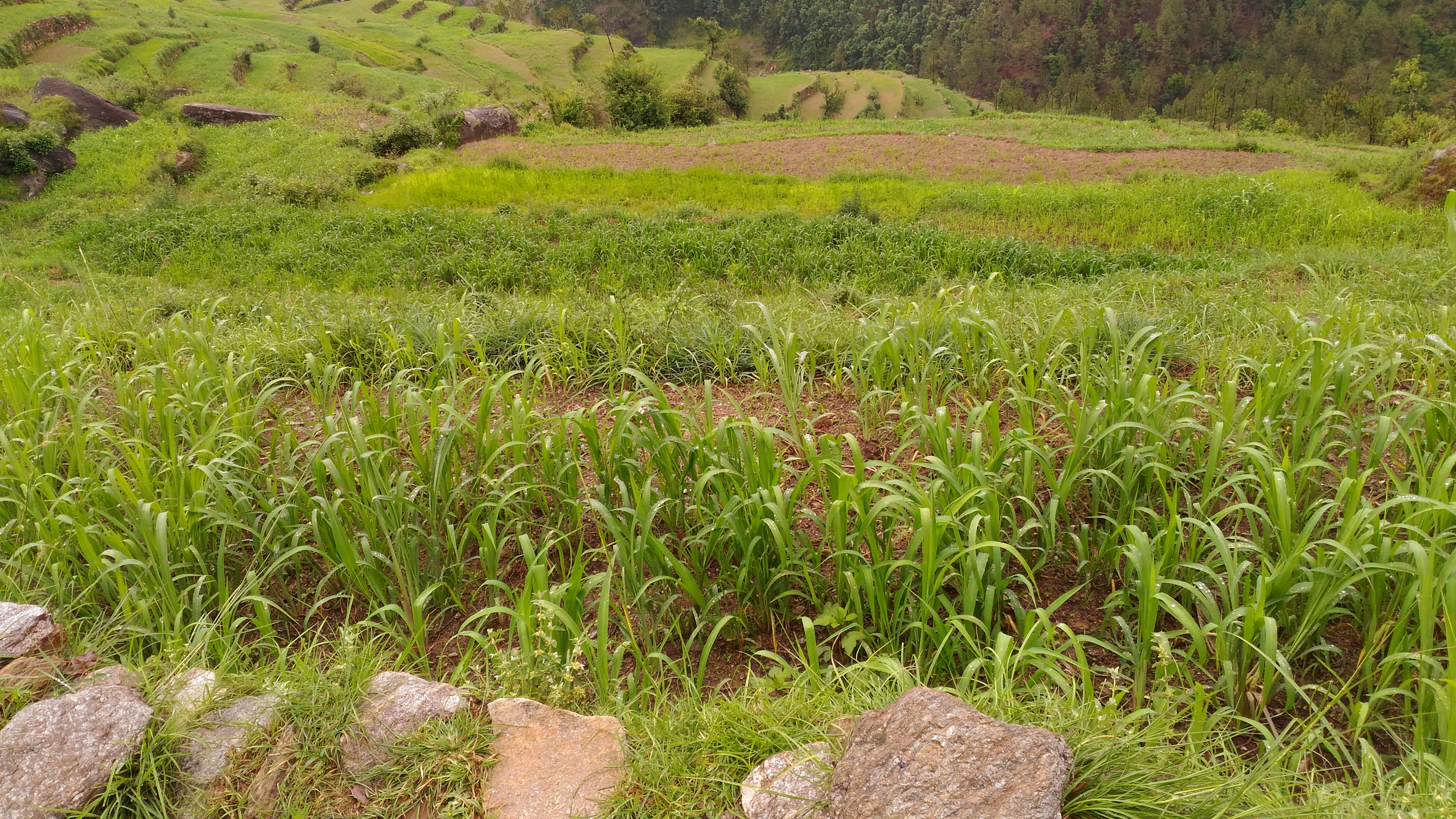
Millet fields in the upper reaches of Nayaar river valley.

== See also ==
- Kalinka, Pauri Garhwal, the hill temple of Kalinka, situated in Bironkhal block of Pauri Garhwal district, Uttarakhand.
- Binsar Devta, an ancient rock temple situated in Pauri Garhwal district, Uttarakhand.
