= Satpuli =

- Town
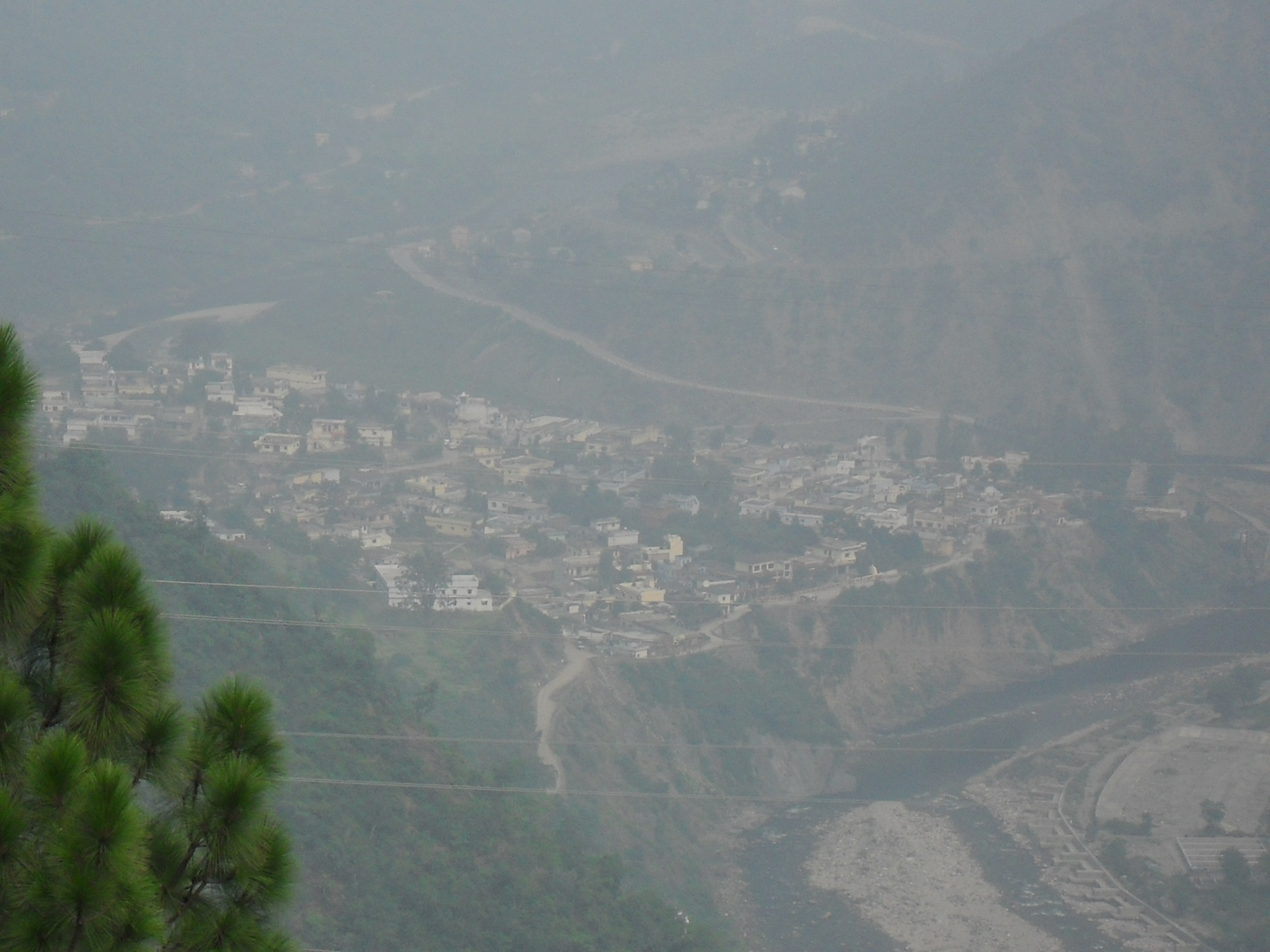

- Location in Uttarakhand, India Satpuli (India)
- Coordinates: 29°55′0″N 78°42′0″E
- Country: India
- State: Uttarakhand
- District: Pauri Garhwal
- Elevation: 657 m (2,156 ft)

Population
  - Total: >10,000

Languages
  - Official: Hindi
- Time zone: UTC+5:30 (IST)
- PIN: 246172
- Telephone code: 01386
- Vehicle registration: UK
- Nearest city: Pauri & Kotdwar
- Avg. summer temperature: 25–40 °C (77–104 °F)
- Avg. winter temperature: 1–30 °C (34–86 °F)
- Website: pauri.nic.in

Satpuli is a town on the Kothdwar-Pauri highway, located approximately 50 kilometers from Kotdwar and 50 kilometers from Pauri, in Pauri Garhwal district of Uttarakhand.

== Location ==
Satpuli is located on the southern banks of the Nayar (East) river, a kilometer away from the confluence of the Nayar (East) and Nayar (West) rivers. It is also connected to Banghat, which is where the unified Nayar river meets the Ganges River. Satpuli is one of the blocks of the Pauri Garhwal district with its block office at Satpuli town. There is also a hospital by Hans Foundation located at Chamolsain near Satpuli, which is the main pathway to the Pauri Garhwal district. The Satpuli block covers 263 villages.

== History ==
It is said that Satpuli got its name from the fact that it has seven bridges (saat-pul) on its way from Kotdwar. Until a few decades ago, this area was primarily farmland. Gradually, some hut-like shops sprang up on one bank of the river. In 1951 Satpuli experienced a massive flood, leading to loss of life and livestock. Some of the shops and noteworthy buildings, such as the office of G.M.O.U. Pvt. Ltd., were swept away. Later, shopkeepers resettled at the present location. A memorial has been erected at the Hydel power station in the memory of people who died in the great flood of the Nayar River valley. Satpuli is known for its maaccha bhaat (fish curry and rice). It is also a resting place for travelers to have lunch or dinner en route Kotdwar, Pauri, Srinagar, or higher reaches of Nayar valley. Now it is a Town Area.

== Infrastructure ==
The town is growing at a rapid rate and has expanded in an unorganized way leading to garbage, drainage, and sanitary problems which are generally difficult to address in mountains. Nearby villagers come to Satpuli to shop for groceries and other consumables.

Satpuli has four banks: SBI (State Bank of India), Syndicate Bank, Zila Sahkari Bank, and Uttarakhand Gramin Bank. Syndicate Bank opened in 2014 and since then has been the main financial organization for Satpuli and all of the nearby villages. Over the last couple of decades, many army veterans and their families (specifically from Garhwal Rifles), as well as old people, have settled in Satpuli after transferring their pension accounts to the nearby banks.

Satpuli is also emerging as a new institutional area in the district after the establishment of Government Polytechnic College, Degree College, Navodaya Vidyalaya-Khairasaim, Sriverm ITI, Swami Ram Polytechnic-Toli, and some public and private schools like hans sun rise children's academy that also provide free education.

A handful of clinics and hospitals serve the town and the surrounding rural areas like Sri Hans Hospital.

== Attractions ==
Satpuli is an ideal place for angling and fishing as both the Nayar (East) and Nayar (West) rivers are teeming with fish. The variety and number of fish further increase after the confluence of these two rivers. There are freshwater eel (known as Gaid in Garhwali), a local variety of spotted catfish (known as Kaana in Garhwali), and Anchhyaal (a kind of river carp). Crab, river snakes, otters, water birds, and periwinkles can also be seen.

Lansdowne, which is perhaps the calmest, cleanest, and the least crowded hill station, is 30 kilometers away. It is a journey of 1 hour on winding hilly roads, from 2200 feet at Satpuli to 6000 feet at Lansdowne. Lansdowne is also known for its jungle safari.

There are many temples near Satpuli, such as Jwalpa Devi Temple (about 19.2km from Satpuli), Bhuvaneshwari Devi Temple (near the confluence of the Nayar and Ganges rivers), and Bhairav Garhi (a medieval Garhwali fortress and temple at a height of 7200 feet). Satpuli celebrates Ramleela, Grishmotsava, Sharadotsav, and many other festive occasions, which are visited by multitudes of people.

== Geography and Climate ==
At an elevation of 657 meters above sea level (approximately 2200 feet), Satpuli has a warm temperate climate similar to Srinagar and Dehradun. Under the Köppen climate classification, Satpuli has a combination of Subtropical Monsoon (Cwa) and Subtropical Highland (Cwb) climates. Temperature can range from the lowest of -1 (30 F) to a maximum of 45 (113 F) degrees Celsius. March & November are the most pleasant months. January is the coldest month, and June is the warmest. During summer days, due to its altitude, it is just a few degrees cooler than the national capital.
