= Kalinka =

Kalinka may refer to:

== Places ==
- Kalinka, Kardzhali Province, Kardzhali Municipality, Bulgaria
- Kalinka Temple, a temple in northern India
- Kalinka, Lublin Voivodeship, a village in the Lublin Voivodeship, Poland
- Kalinka, Russia, the name of several rural localities in Russia

== People ==
- Kalinka (artist) (born 1968), Italo-Russian video-artist
- Kalinka Bamberski, a French girl who was murdered by her German stepfather in 1982
- Ernst Kalinka (1865–1946), Austrian archaeologist
- Valerian Kalinka (1826–1886), Polish priest and historian

== Other ==
- "Kalinka" (1860 song), a Russian folk song
- "Kalinka" (Infernal song), 1998
- "Kalinka", a song by Morandi, 2018
- Kalinka (film), a 2016 French film
- Kalinka Cossack, a character in the video game Mega Man 4
- Kalinka system, a monitoring system developed by Russia

== See also ==
- Kalina (disambiguation)
