= Gujrugarhi =

Historic site in Uttarakhand

- गुजडू गढ़ी (Garhwali)
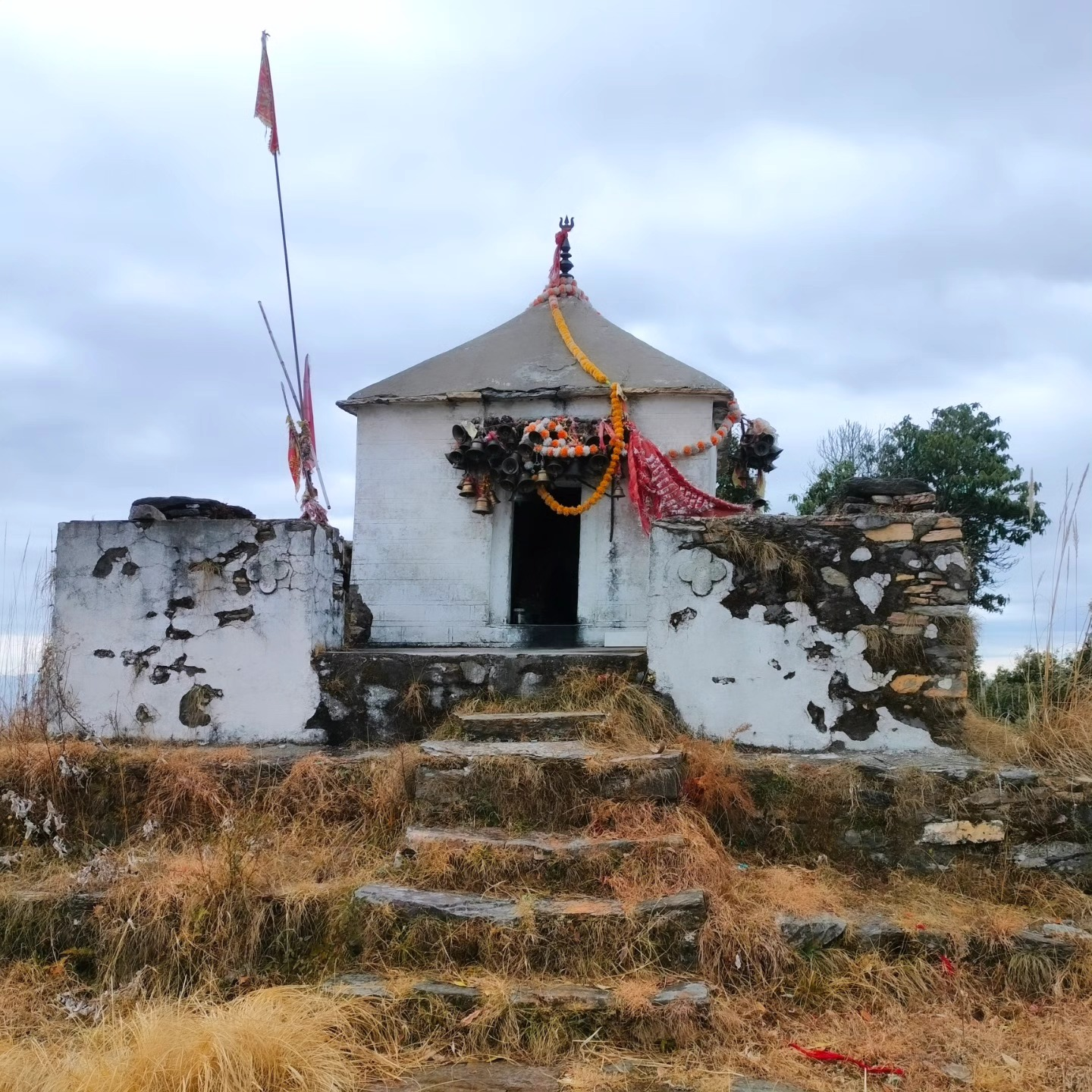
- Gujrugarhi Temple

- Location in Uttarakhand, India Gujrugarhi (India)
- 29.781°N 79.088°E
- Type: Hill fort
- Location: Patti Gujdu, Nainidanda, Pauri Garhwal, Uttarakhand
- Part of: 52 Garhs of Garhwal

Site notes
- Elevation: 2,400 m (7,900 ft)
- Area: Diba Danda
- Condition: Ruins / historical remains

Gujrugarhi (also known as Gujru Garh or Gujdu Garh) is a historic hill fort site in Pauri Garhwal district, Uttarakhand, India. It is situated in Patti Gujdu of the Nainidanda block, on the Deeba Range, at an elevation of approximately 2,400 metres (7,880 ft).The site is traditionally associated with the 52 Garhs of Garhwal, a group of historic forts that played a role in the defence and administration of the Garhwal region. The remains at Gujrugarhi include stone and earthen defensive structures, historic caves, and a temple, reflecting the site's historical and cultural importance.

== History ==
The whole complex was a part of Gujrugarh (Gujru Fort), one of the 52 forts in the entire Garhwal region. The temple is centuries old dating back to the time of Garhwal kingdom and played an important role during Gorkha invasions. The caves are pre-historic and quite possibly were used as shelter by early humans. There are few man-made ditches visible on the way which were possibly used by warriors during Gorkha period. Several battles were fought in the region because of its strategic position and the presence and activity of different clans nearby.

== Geography ==
The temple and caves are on an almost flat hilltop at the extreme eastern end of Diba Danda at an average altitude of 2400 metres, highest point in Patti of 'Gujdu. It is surrounded by dense mixed broad leaf forests consisting of Oaks, Rhododendrons and other local species. The ridge offers a good and expansive view of Himalayan ranges. From Yamunotri peaks in North-west Garhwal to Trisul range in eastern Garhwal along with several other smaller peaks of Kumaon and Nepal in further east are visible. Several small freshwater streams are formed in the deep interiors of the forest and flow down to meet larger creeks and brooks which ultimately merge into Ramganga (West) river. There is an ancient well on the hilltop which is quite strange and rare for a Himalayan location. There is still water in it but apparently not potable due to presence of dead animals in it.

=== Climate ===
Gujrugarhi experiences a Subtropical highland climate just like other Himalayan and Sub-Himalayan regions. Due to its high altitude it was used as an observation point by Garhwali Chieftains. It has a pleasant climate in Summers. Monsoon brings heavy rains and with it comes lush greenery. It gets very cold in winters, snowfall is common. The region receives bright sunshine during winter since the skies are crystal clear in winter.

== How to reach ==
Gujrugarhi can be reached after a 4 km moderate trek from Kingorikhal. Kingorikhal lies at an average altitude of 1840 metres (6104 ft) on Ramnagar-Sonfkhal-Saraikhet road. Nearest major town is Dhumakot at a distance of 20 km and Manila Devi in Almora district lies at a distance of 20 km.

== See also ==
Garhwal kingdom

Devalgarh
