= Dhumakot =

Tehsil in Uttarakhand, India

- Tehsil
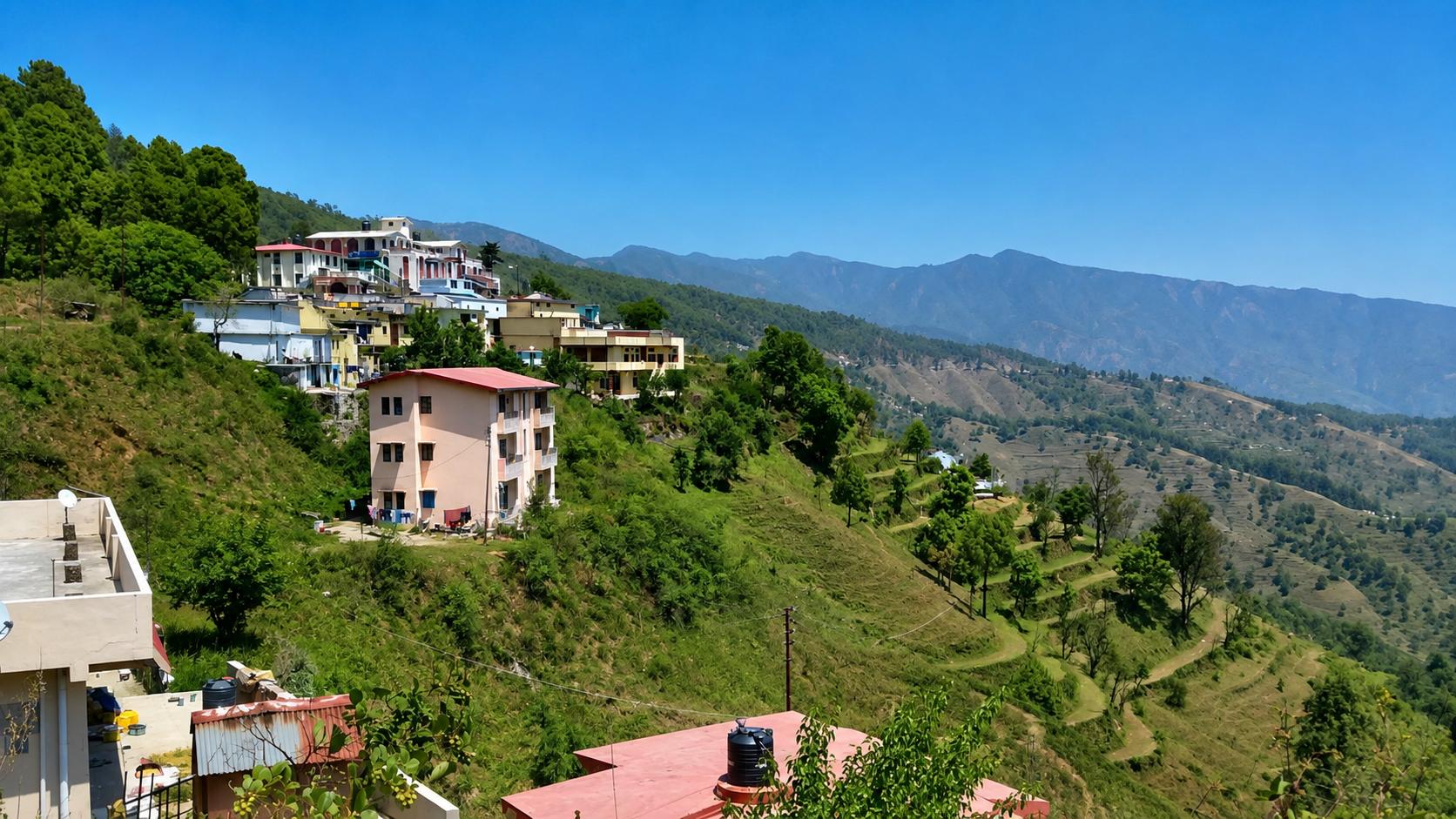
- Dhumakot Town in Nainidanda Block

- Location in Uttarakhand, India Dhumakot (India)
- Coordinates: 29.753°N 79.010°E
- Country: India
- State: Uttarakhand
- District: Pauri Garhwal
- Block: Nainidanda
- Elevation: 1,840 m (6,040 ft)

Languages
  - Official: Hindi
  - Native: Garhwali
- Time zone: UTC+5:30
- PIN: 246275
- Vehicle registration: UK-12
- Website: pauri.gov.in

Dhumakot is a hill town and administrative tehsil located in the Pauri Garhwal district of the Indian state of Uttarakhand. It is bordered by the tehsils of Lansdowne, Kotdwar, Thalisain and Bironkhal. It is also bordered by the districts Almora and Nainital of Kumaon division.

== Etymology ==
The name Dhumakot (धूमाकोट) was derived from Dhuma Devi (धूमा देवी), a goddess worshipped in the area. A temple dedicated to Dhuma Devi is located in Dhumakot. The settlement was named after the goddess. The suffix "-kot" (कोट) is a common element in Himalayan place names and refers to a fort or fortified settlement. Thus, Dhumakot refers to the settlement or fort associated with Dhuma Devi.

== Geography ==
Located in the Pauri Garhwal district of Uttarakhand at approximately 29.749°N 79.015°E longitude. It lies in the Lower Himalayan Region, marked by hilly terrain, forests, and seasonal streams.The tehsil is divided into several revenue villages.

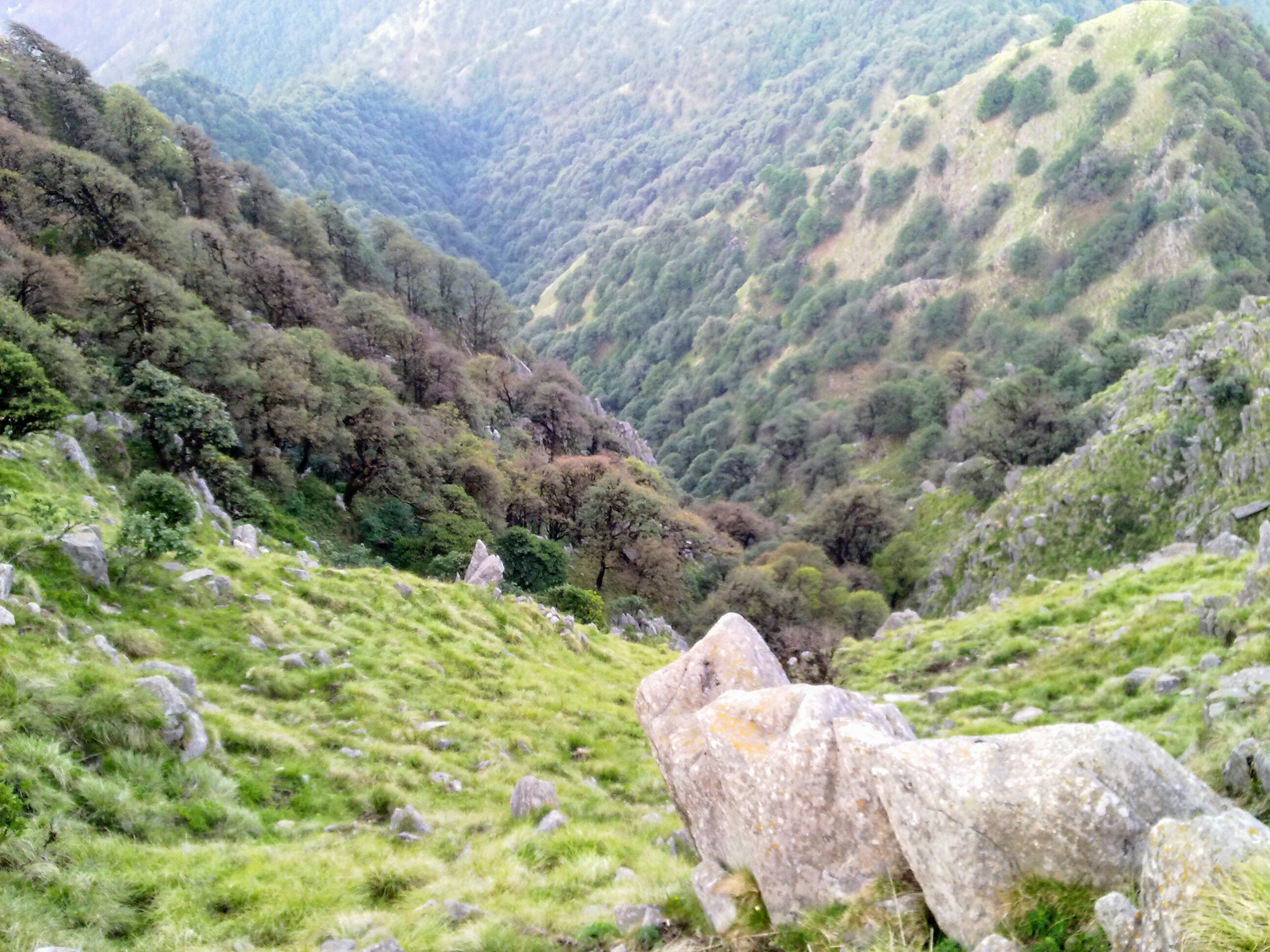
Deeba Danda

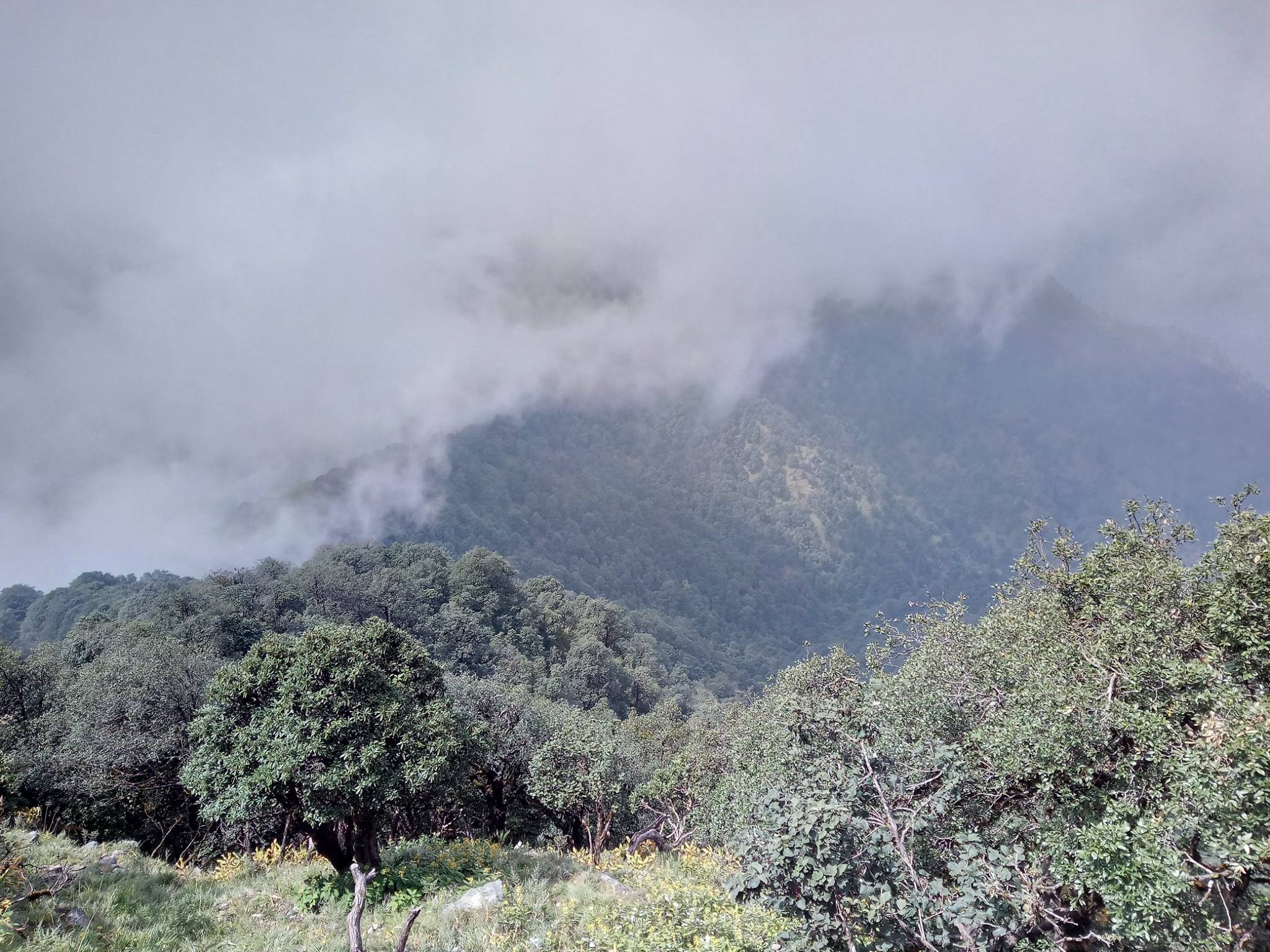
Forests of Deeba Danda.

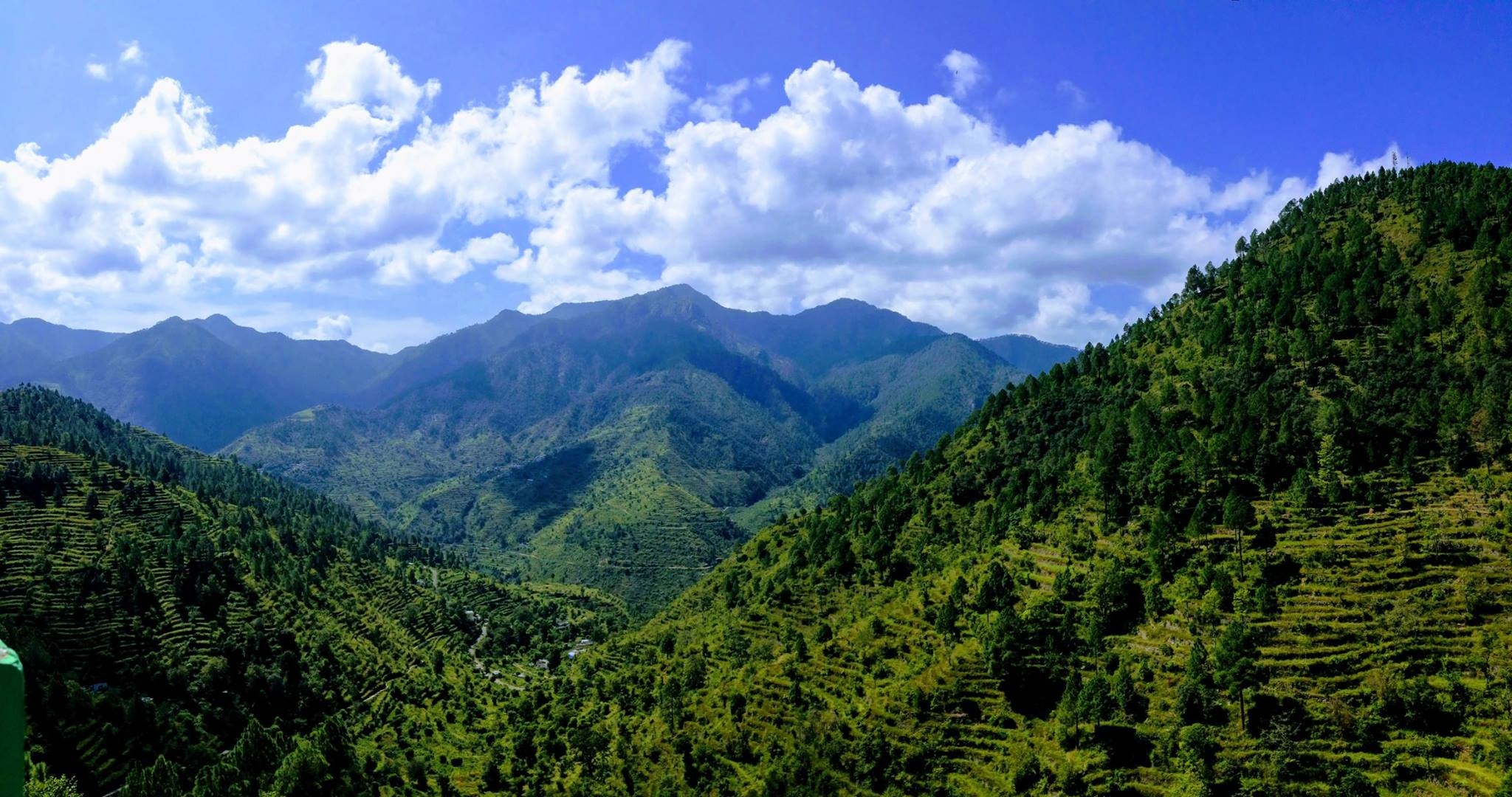
Deeba Danda Range

=== Climate ===
Dhumakot has a warm and moderate climate, strongly influenced by its elevation and Himalayan terrain. The climate is classified as Cwb (subtropical highland climate with dry winters) under the Köppen–Geiger system. The average annual temperature is approximately 15.7°C, with annual precipitation of about 1,837 mm. Rainfall is concentrated during the summer monsoon, with July being the wettest month, receiving around 547 mm of rainfall, while November is the driest, with about 7 mm. June is the warmest month, with an average temperature of about 21.7°C, while January is considerably cooler, with an average low of around 7.2°C. The combination of Dhumakot's elevation, mountainous topography and seasonal monsoon rainfall gives the area a distinctive cool-to-moderate Himalayan climate.

Dhumakot

Climate chart (precipitation, max. and min. temperature)
J	F	M	A	M	J	J	A	S	O	N	D
38 14 2	62 16 4	46 20 7	43 25 11	80 26 15	228 26 17	547 24 19	499 24 18	235 23 16	35 21 11	7 19 7	17 16 3
- █ Average max. and min. temperatures in °C
- █ Precipitation totals in mm
Imperial conversion
J	F	M	A	M	J	J	A	S	O	N	D
1.5 56 35	2.4 60 38	1.8 68 44	1.7 76 52	3.1 80 58	9 79 63	22 75 66	20 74 65	9.3 74 61	1.4 70 51	0.3 65 44	0.7 60 38
- █ Average max. and min. temperatures in °F
- █ Precipitation totals in inches

Climate data for Dhumakot (1991–2021)
Month	Jan	Feb	Mar	Apr	May	Jun	Jul	Aug	Sep	Oct	Nov	Dec	Year
Mean daily maximum °C (°F)	13.5 (56.3)	15.6 (60.1)	19.8 (67.6)	24.6 (76.3)	26.4 (79.5)	26.1 (79.0)	24.0 (75.2)	23.6 (74.5)	23.2 (73.8)	21.3 (70.3)	18.6 (65.5)	15.6 (60.1)	26.4 (79.5)
Daily mean °C (°F)	7.2 (45.0)	9.4 (48.9)	13.4 (56.1)	18.1 (64.6)	20.6 (69.1)	21.7 (71.1)	21.0 (69.8)	20.6 (69.1)	19.3 (66.7)	15.8 (60.4)	12.3 (54.1)	8.9 (48.0)	15.7 (60.2)
Mean daily minimum °C (°F)	1.6 (34.9)	3.5 (38.3)	6.8 (44.2)	11.2 (52.2)	14.5 (58.1)	17.2 (63.0)	18.7 (65.7)	18.3 (64.9)	16.0 (60.8)	10.8 (51.4)	6.7 (44.1)	3.2 (37.8)	10.7 (51.3)
Average rainfall mm (inches)	38 (1.5)	62 (2.4)	46 (1.8)	43 (1.7)	80 (3.1)	228 (9.0)	547 (21.5)	499 (19.6)	235 (9.3)	35 (1.4)	7 (0.3)	17 (0.7)	1,837 (72.3)
Average rainy days	4	6	6	6	10	15	21	21	17	6	1	2	115
Average relative humidity (%)	73	67	56	44	51	67	88	89	85	73	69	71	68
Source: Climate-Data.org

Data periods: 1991–2021 for minimum and maximum temperature, precipitation, humidity and rainy days; 1999–2019 for average sunshine hours.

== Historical Place ==
Gujrugarhi - Located in the Nainidanda region of Pauri Garhwal, Gujrugarhi is a historic site associated with Gujru Fort, traditionally counted among the 52 forts of Garhwal region. The site contains an old temple and caves, and its strategic location is associated with the history of the Garhwal kingdom and the period of the Gorkha invasions. Gujrugarhi is approximately 20 km from Dhumakot and is reached by a trek from Kingorikhal.

Deeba Devi Temple, also known as Deeba Temple, is a Hindu temple located in the Patti Khatli area of Pauri Garhwal district, Uttarakhand, India. The temple is dedicated to Deeba Devi, who is regarded in local tradition as a guardian deity of the surrounding region. Local oral traditions associate the shrine with the period of Gorkha expansion into Garhwal and credit the goddess with protecting the local population. The temple stands on an elevated ridge known as Deeba Danda and is noted locally for its panoramic views of the surrounding hills. Several legends and religious traditions are associated with the shrine, including stories concerning a cave beneath the temple and the goddess's role in protecting people during the Gorkha period.

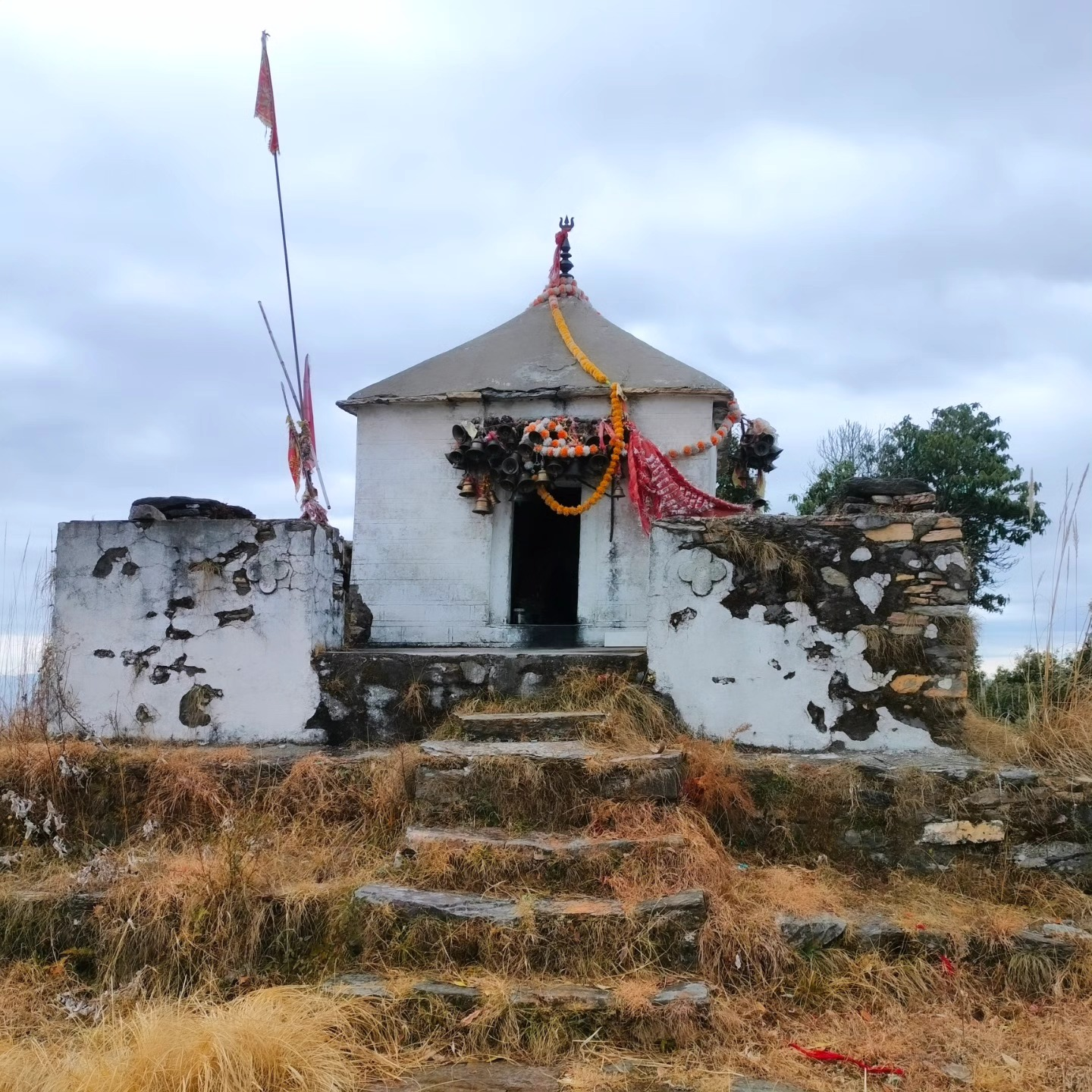
Gujrugarhi Temple

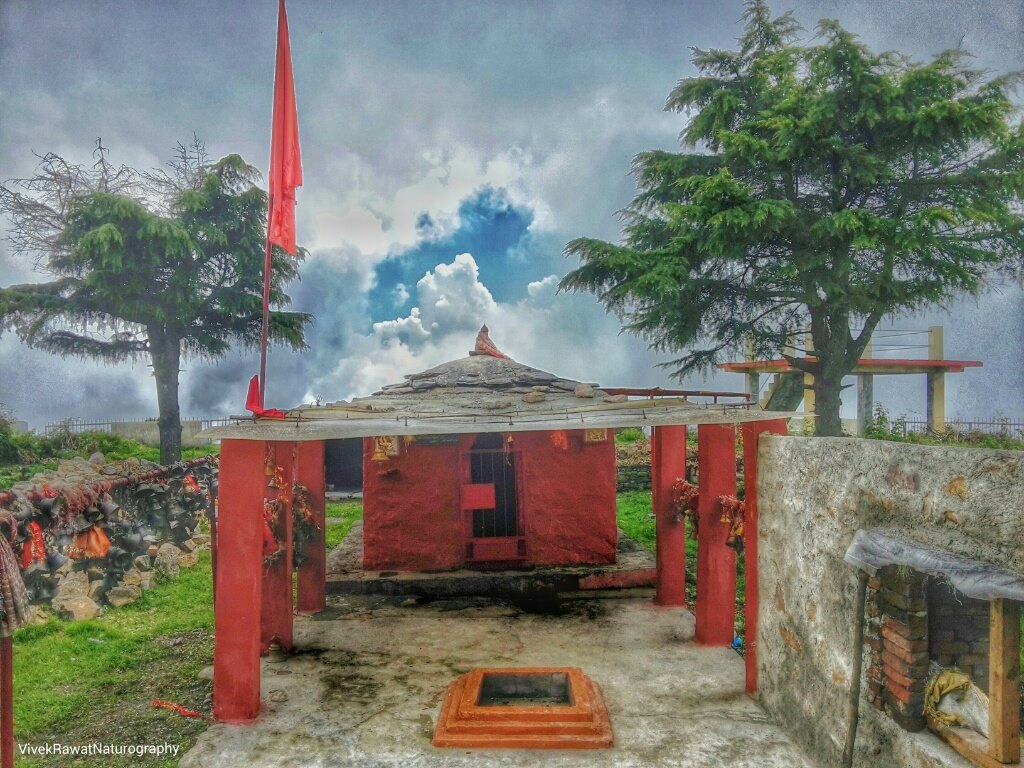
Deeba Devi Temple

Deeba Devi Temple

== Politics ==
Previously, it was an assembly constituency but the seat was abolished in 2012 after delimitation. The area is now part of Lansdowne seat and in Lok Sabha it is part of Garhwal seat. Former Uttarakhand Chief minister B.C. Khanduri represented the Dhumakot constituency and later served as Chief Minister from September 2011 to March 2012.

== Demographics ==
According to the 2011 Census of India, Dhumakot tehsil in Pauri Garhwal district had a population of 39,230 people, distributed across 331 villages. The population is predominantly rural, with settlement scattered across the mountainous terrain of the Garhwal Himalayas.

== Economy ==
The economy of Dhumakot is largely dependent on agriculture, with rice, and wheat being the main crops. The tehsil is also home to a number of small-scale industries, including handlooms, handicrafts, and forestry. There is a Government Degree College in the area.

== Transport ==
Dhumakot is primarily connected by road. Garhwal Motor Owners Union (GMOU) and the Uttarakhand Transport Corporation (UTC) provide bus connectivity to the town and surrounding areas. Taxis and other road-based transport also provide local connectivity. Dhumakot has a bus station serving as a local transport point.

GMOU Bus Dhumakot

UTC Bus Dhumakot

=== Rail ===
Dhumakot has no railway station. The nearest railway station is at Ramnagar, approximately 85 km away.

=== Air ===
The nearest airport is Pantnagar Airport near Rudrapur, approximately 150 km away.
