= Kalinka Temple =

Hindu Temple in Uttarakhand

Kalinka Mandir
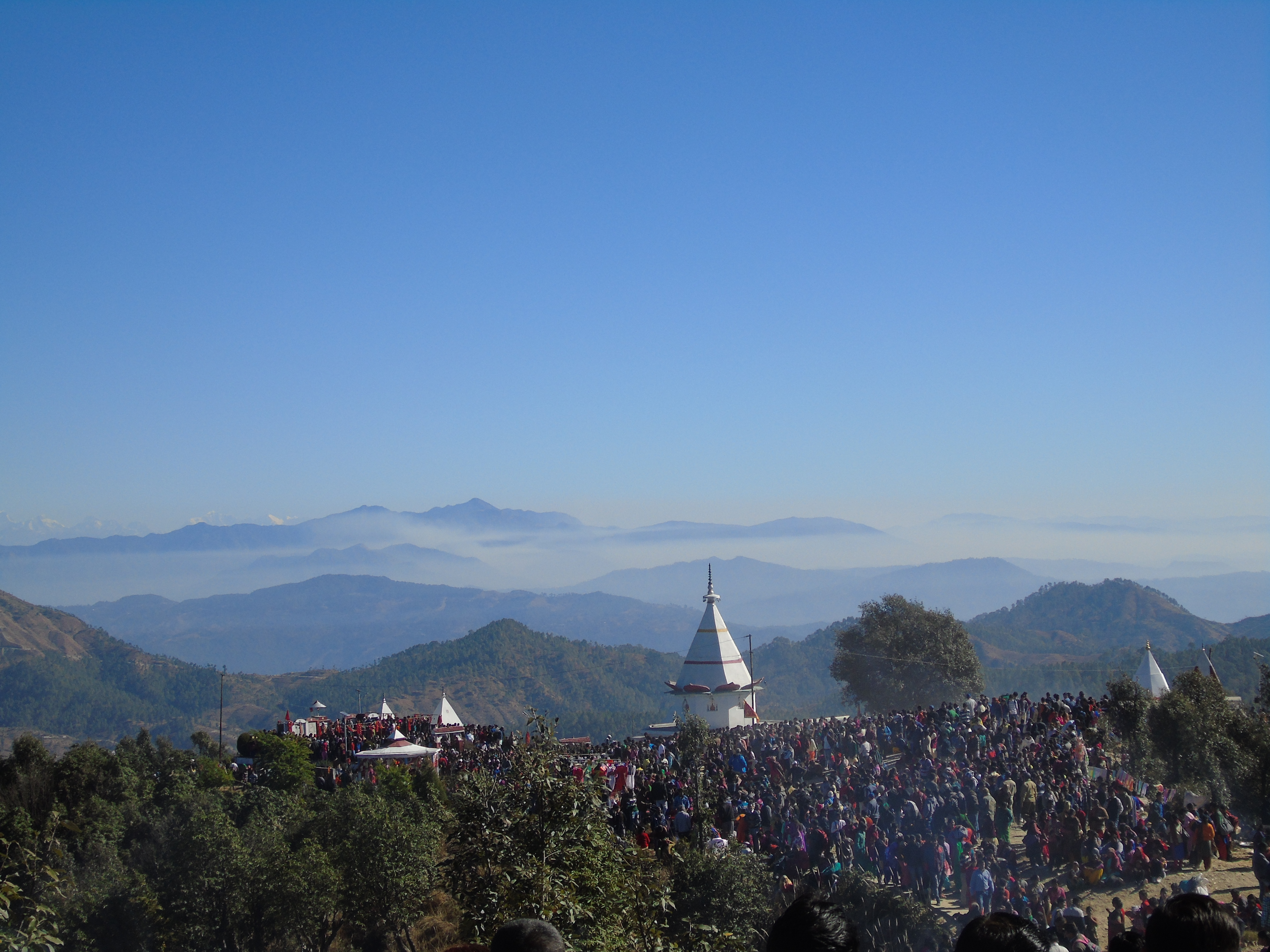

- Location in Uttarakhand

Religion
- Affiliation: Hinduism
- District: Pauri Garhwal district

Location
- Location: Pauri Garhwal, Uttarakhand
- State: Uttarakhand
- Country: India
- Coordinates: 29.8621°N 79.0693°E

Architecture
- Type: Hinduism
- Elevation: 2,090 m (6,857 ft)

Website
- kalinkamandir.org

The hill temple of Kalinka is situated in Bironkhal block of Pauri Garhwal district, Uttarakhand in northern India. The temple complex lies close to the border with the Almora district and is dedicated to Goddess Kali. The temple has been in existence for centuries but the new structure has been renovated a couple of times in the last decade. It is often confused with Bunkhal kalinka, which is near Malund village of Raath region in Thalisain.

== History ==
Historically, construction of the temple has been credited to the Badiyaari community. Badiyaris were a semi-nomadic shepherding tribe. Until recently, they have taken up varying professions in the state, some settling in larger cities within or outside of Uttarakhand. However, some still practice their ancestral profession of farming and animal husbandry. According to a folk-legend, a badiyaari shepherd was herding his sheep on the ridge which houses the temple at present. As he was sleeping at night, he was awakened by a loud cracking sound and thunder with flashes of lightning. He saw a bright light and heard a shrill and furious voice that commanded him to climb up the mountain and build a shrine there. The shrine was to be dedicated to the goddess. He, after paying his homage to the goddess, started climbing uphill and after reaching the summit, gathered some rocks and formed a mound.

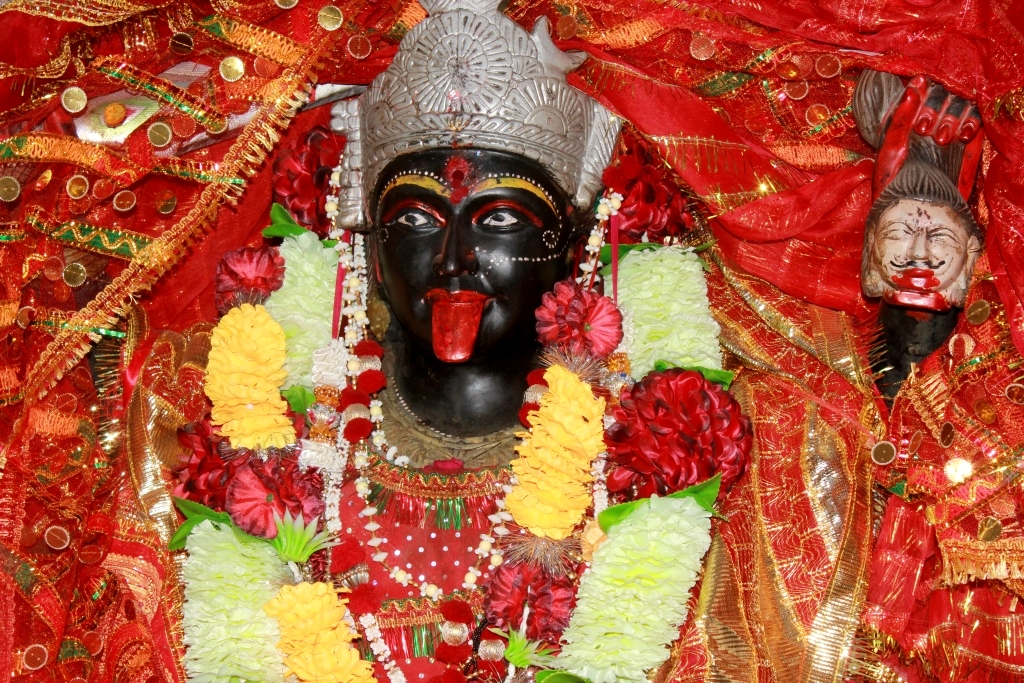
Idol of Goddess Kali inside the temple

Over time, the summit was cleared of all the brambles and vegetation to make bigger structures. The temple in its present lotus-bud shaped shikhar (dome) was constructed around the year 2010. A charitable co-operative by the name of "Garhwal-Almora Kali Mandir Vikas Samiti" has been formed by residents of roughly a dozen villages surrounding the hill-temple. All these villages have a considerable Badiyari population. This organization of villagers keeps the temple premises clean and are responsible for any beautification projects to be taken up in the future.

== Geography and climate ==
Situated at an altitude of roughly 2,100 metres (6,900 ft) on a flat, bare and rocky hilltop which is devoid of much vegetation. As one gets out of the temple premises, there is a dense mixed forest consisting of mainly Banj Oak (Quercus leucotrichophora), Rhododendron, Chir Pine (Pinus roxburghii) many other species. There are many ways to approach the temple from both Garhwal and Kumaon regions. The ascent is of easy to moderate difficulty. It offers a good view of Dudhatoli hills, the Trisul Massif and also peaks of Western Garhwal up to Bandarpunch range. The climate is highland subtropical type (as per Köppen classification). In summer, its pleasantly warm and in winter cool with a bright sunshine. It receives a good amount of rain throughout the year. It also experiences snowfall every season. The temperature during summer fluctuates between 25 and 30 degrees Celsius during the day and 10–15 at night. In winter it is around 15 degrees Celsius during day and around 5 degrees Celsius during the night.

== Social significance ==
The ridge on which this temple is built has been of great importance to the locals. In medieval times, Garhwal and Katyuri (Kumaon) kingdoms were often at war and thus people used this ridge to cross over the two sides. Saabligarh (Named after Patti Saabli or the Saabli region) was a Garhwali fortress in the nearby village of Dhobighat. The fortress due to its high altitude and strategic location acted as a regional frontier between the two kingdoms. The lands of Kumaon to the east of the temple are gentle, consisting of rolling hills and low-lying fertile valleys. Whereas to the West is Garhwal, which comparatively has a more rugged and rocky terrain with higher elevations. Historically, this route has also been used by buyers of cattle from Garhwal. Buffaloes from Kumaon were and still are much coveted among all the cattle, as they have been trained to roam around the terrain for grass and water and then return to their sheds. In the 1960s (before roads came to this part of Garhwal), locals traveled on foot to terai regions, specifically Ramnagar, in order to buy Jaggery and Salt. This was literally everything that they needed as they used to grow everything on their farms. Sugar and Salt are the only two things that are not manufactured in Garhwal hills. As a matter of choice, they preferred the Kumaon route over Garhwal owing to its gentle terrain.

== Quadrennial fair ==
Goddess Kali is much revered among the local people and the temple holds an important place during social events and religious festivals. A fair, known locally as Kālinkā Jatodā, is held here in winter which attracts thousands of local people and outsiders. Historically, hundreds of goats, rams and male buffalo calves have been sacrificed here during that fair. Animal sacrifices have been a subject of controversy and criticism in recent times. Government and law enforcements have been trying to curb this practice but it continues despite all the efforts. It is deeply imbibed in the local culture.

Temple complex during snowfall, February 2018
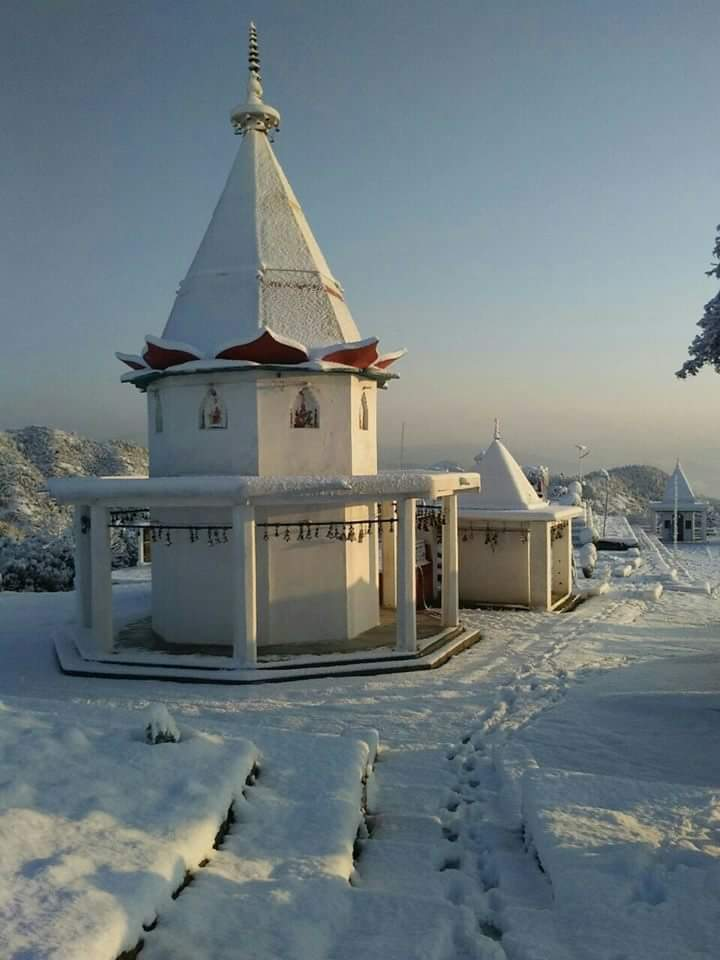

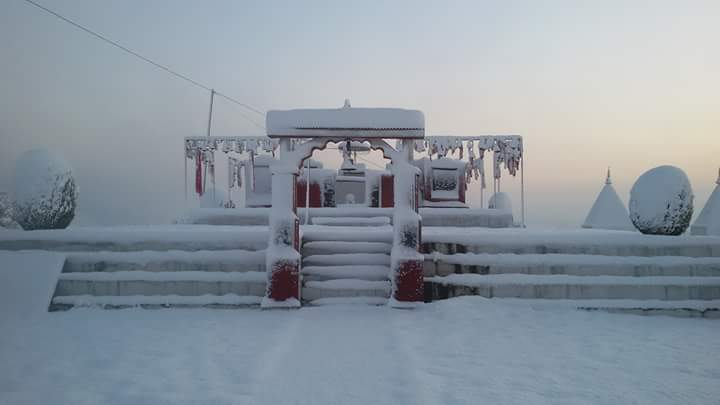

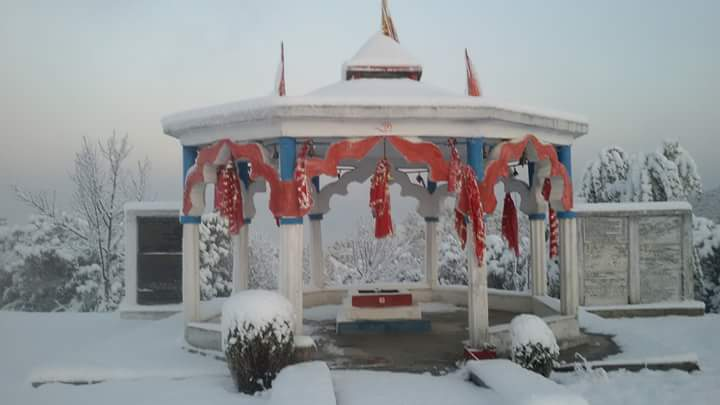

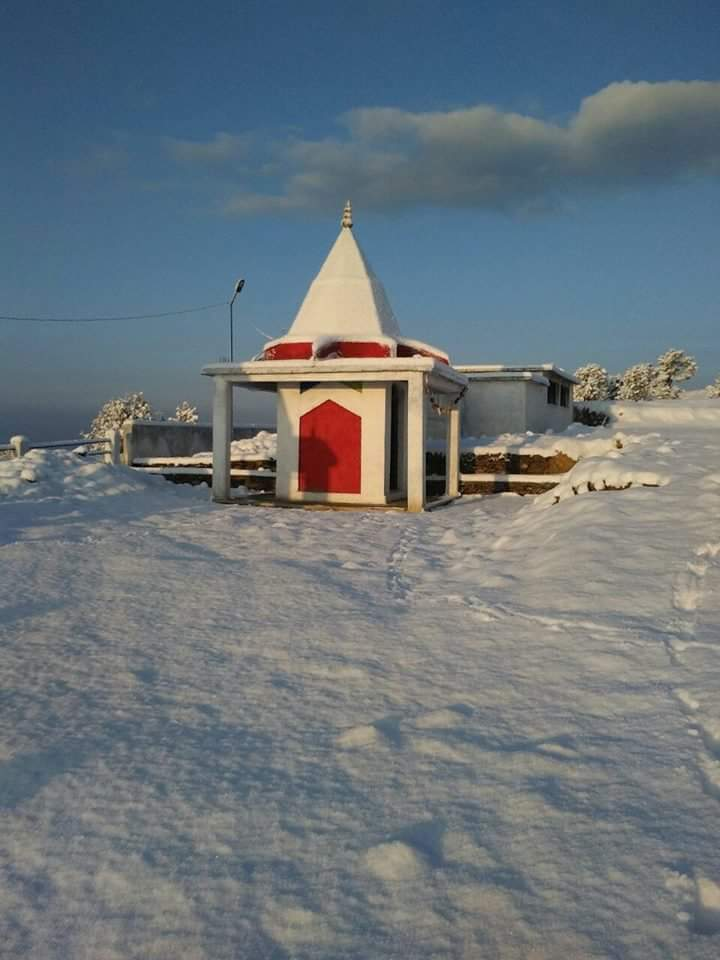

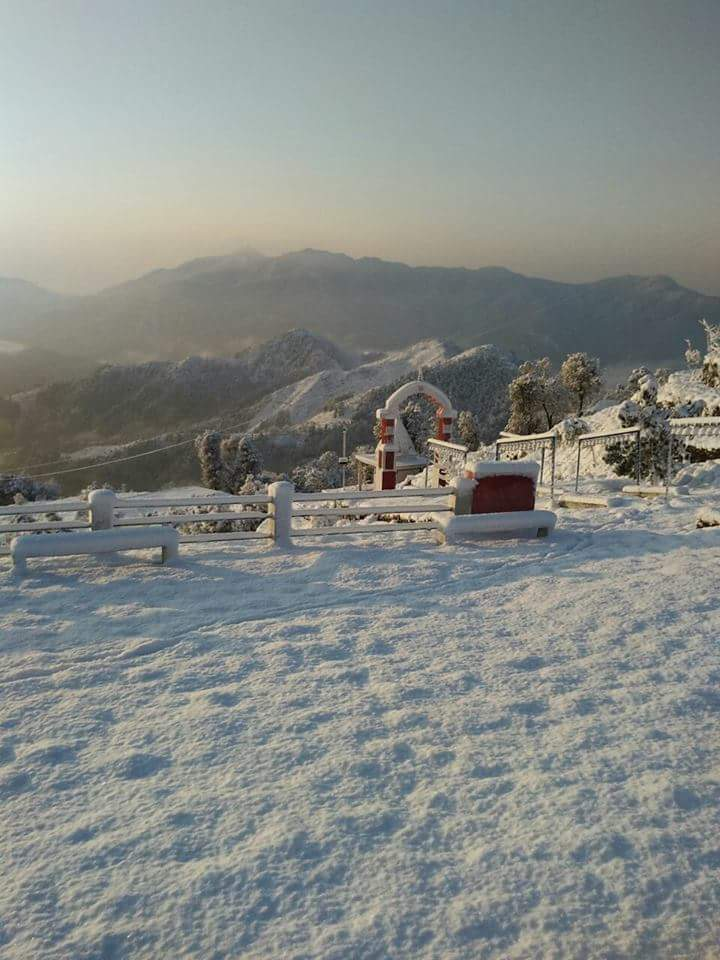

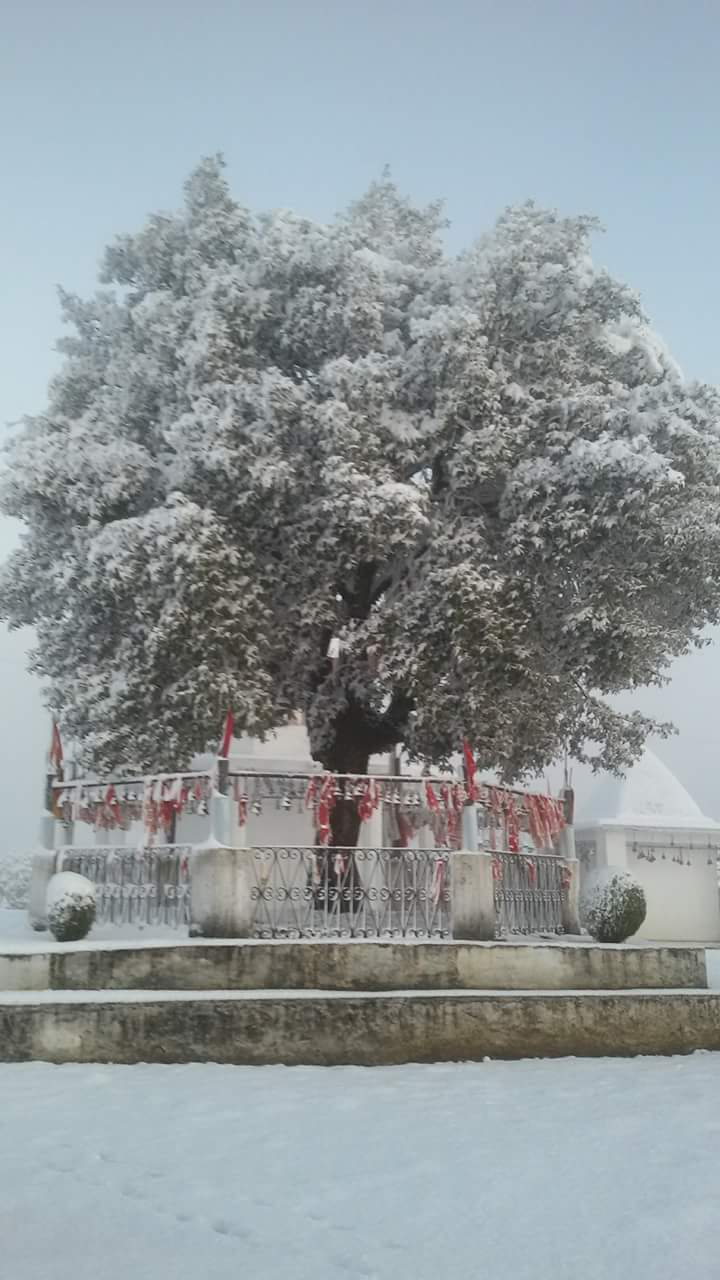

== Himalayan peaks as seen from Kalinka temple ==
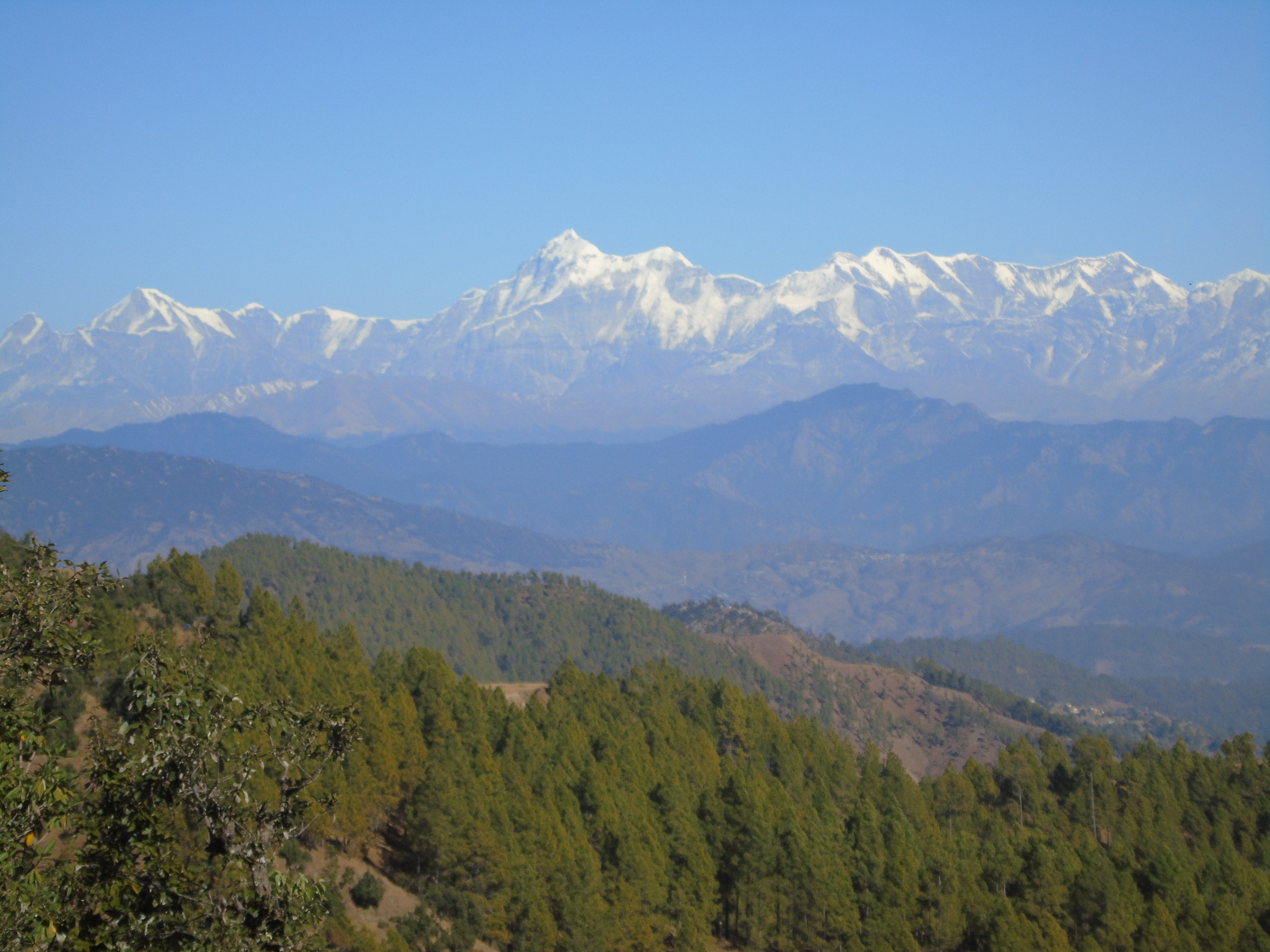
Peaks of North-eastern Garhwal

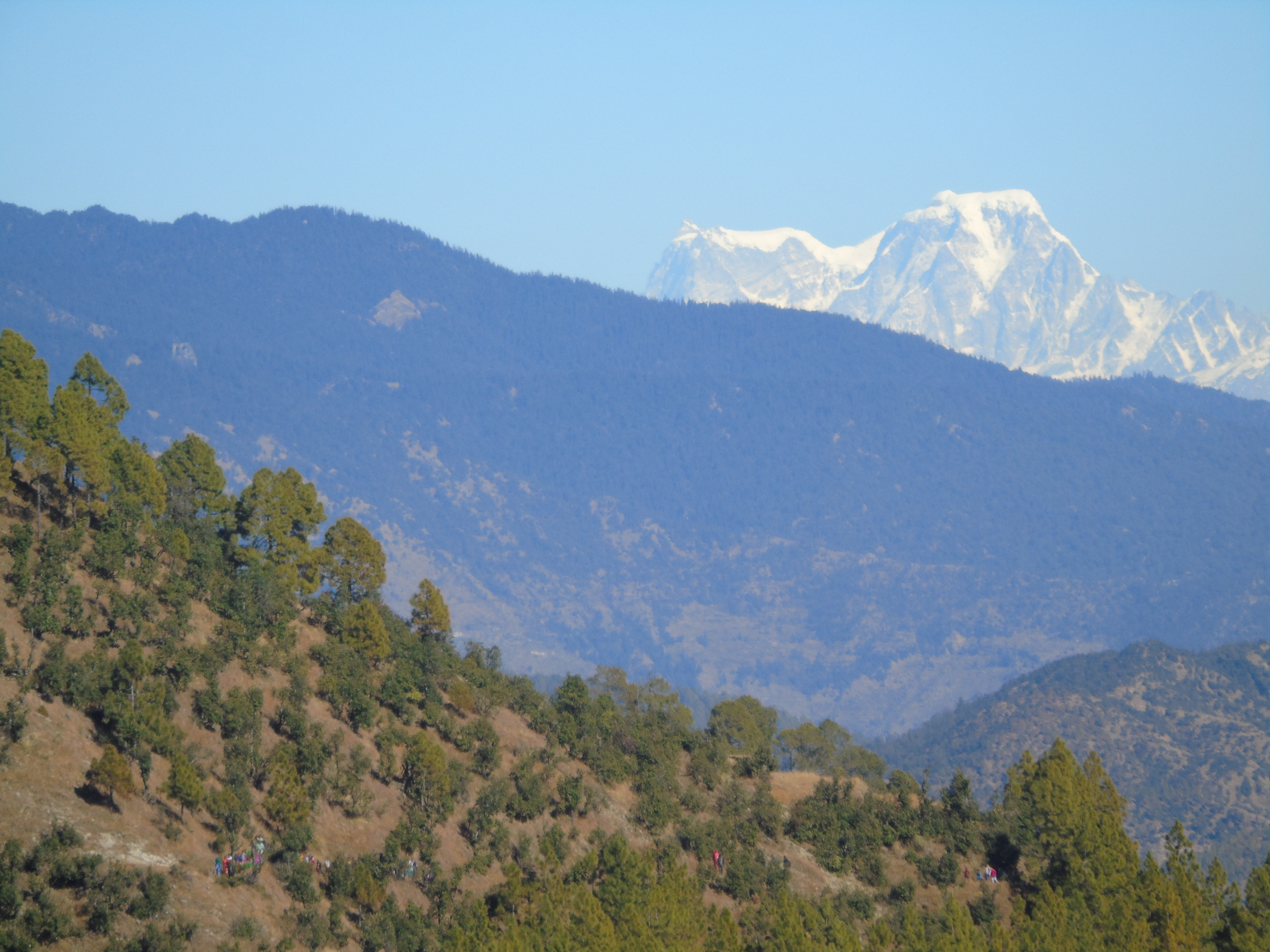
Hathi-Ghodi peaks

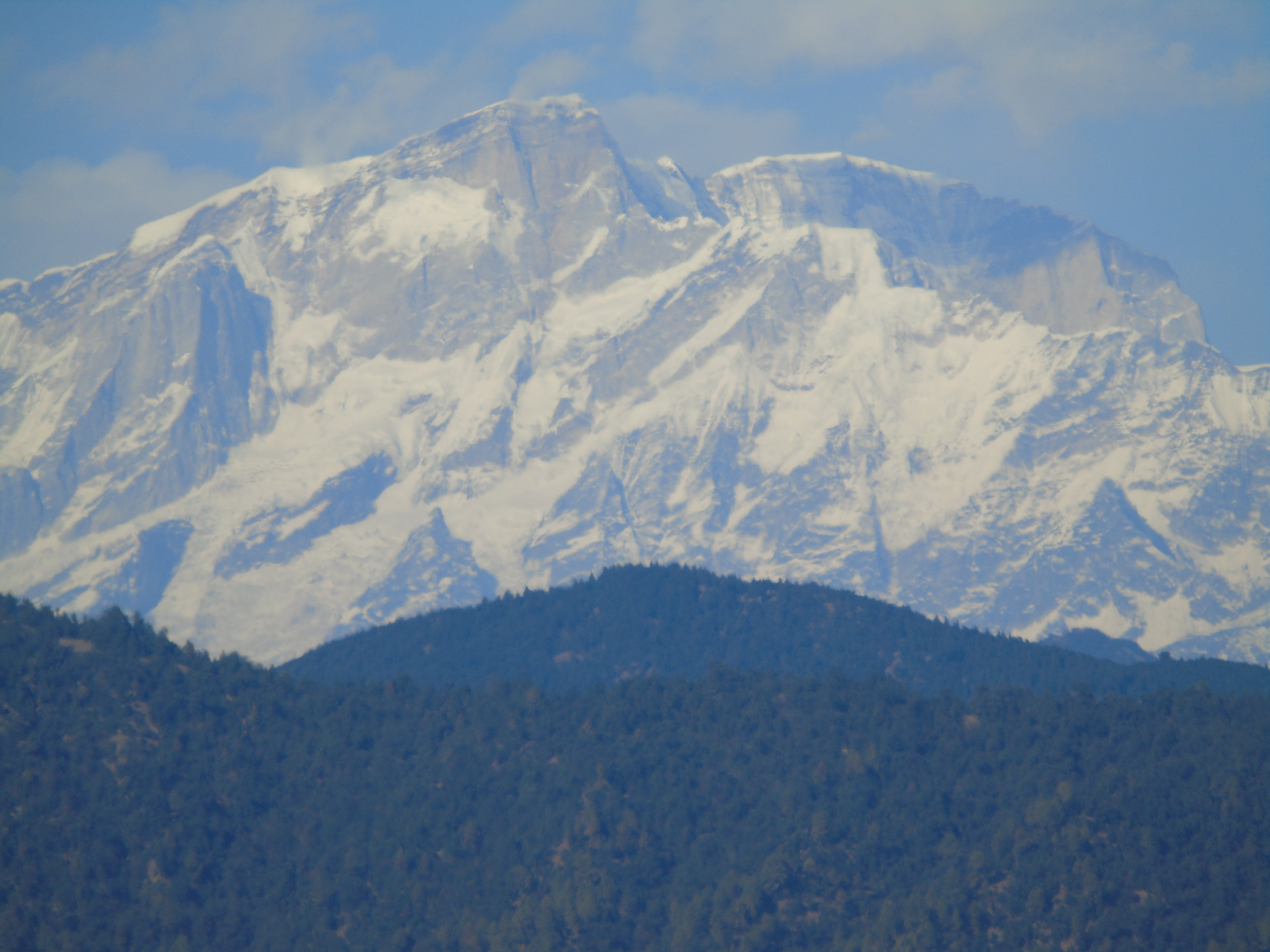
Kedarnath Peak

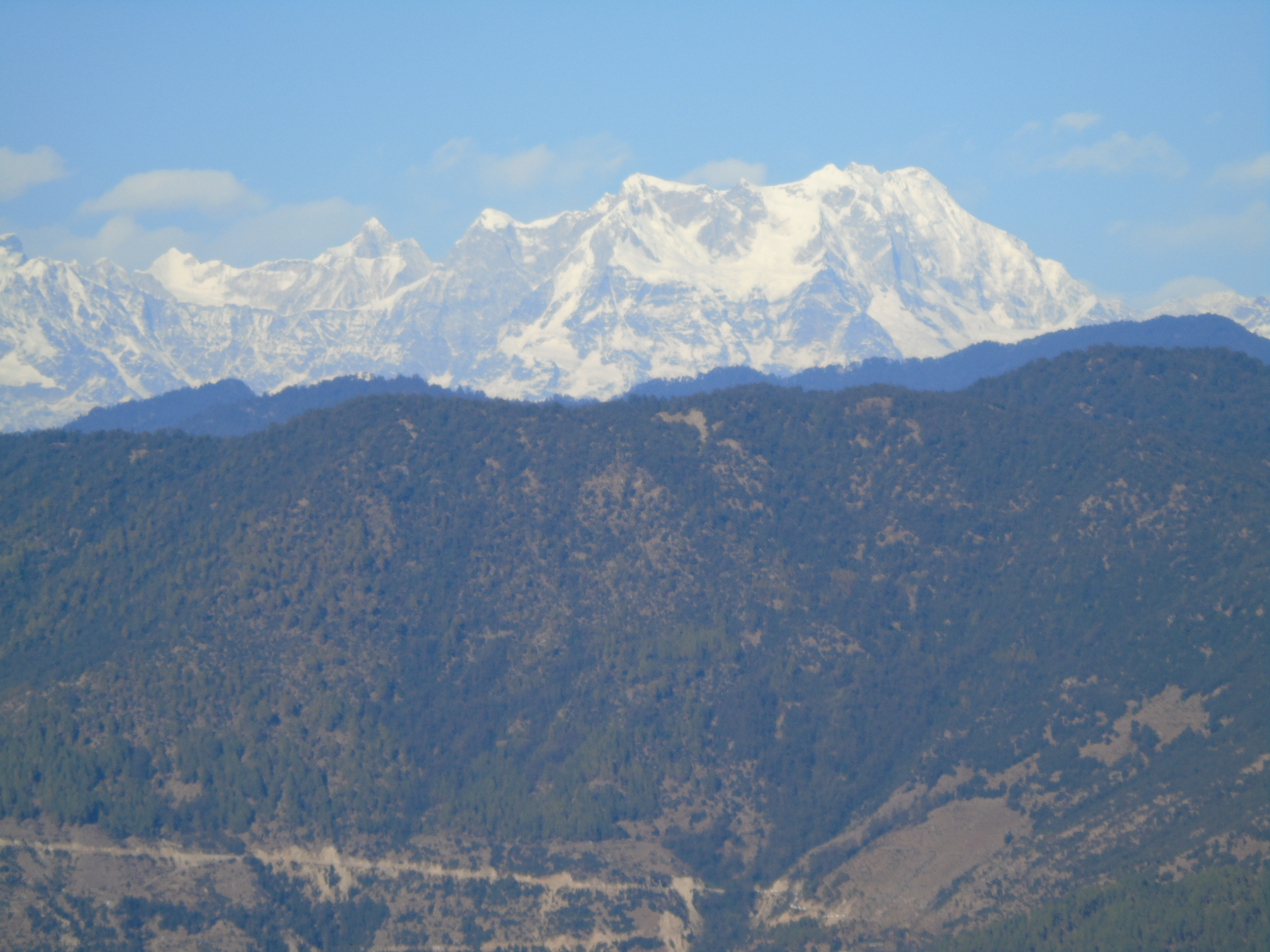
The crown-shaped peak of Chaukhamba

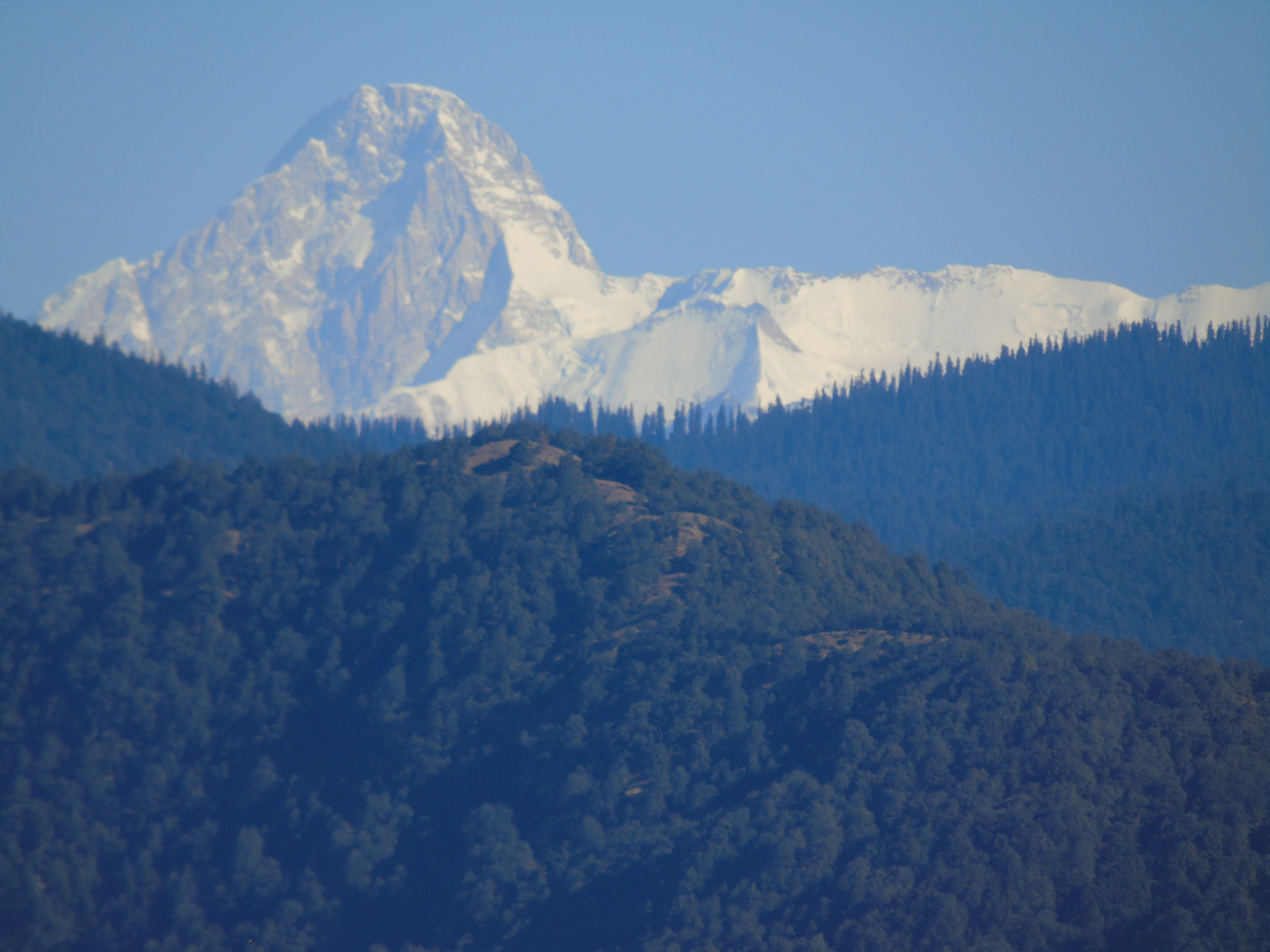
Kamet

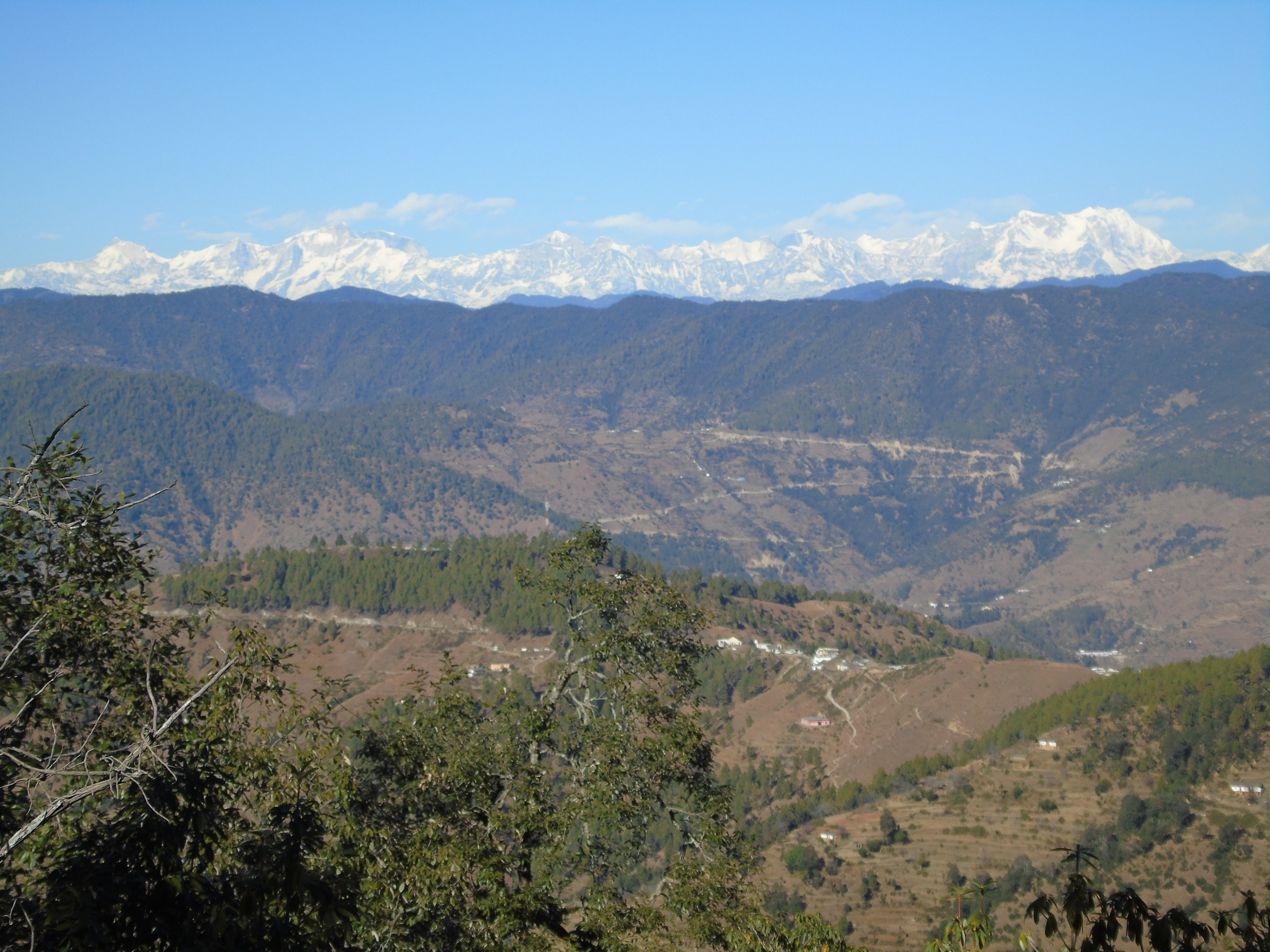
Himalayan peaks of Central Garhwal

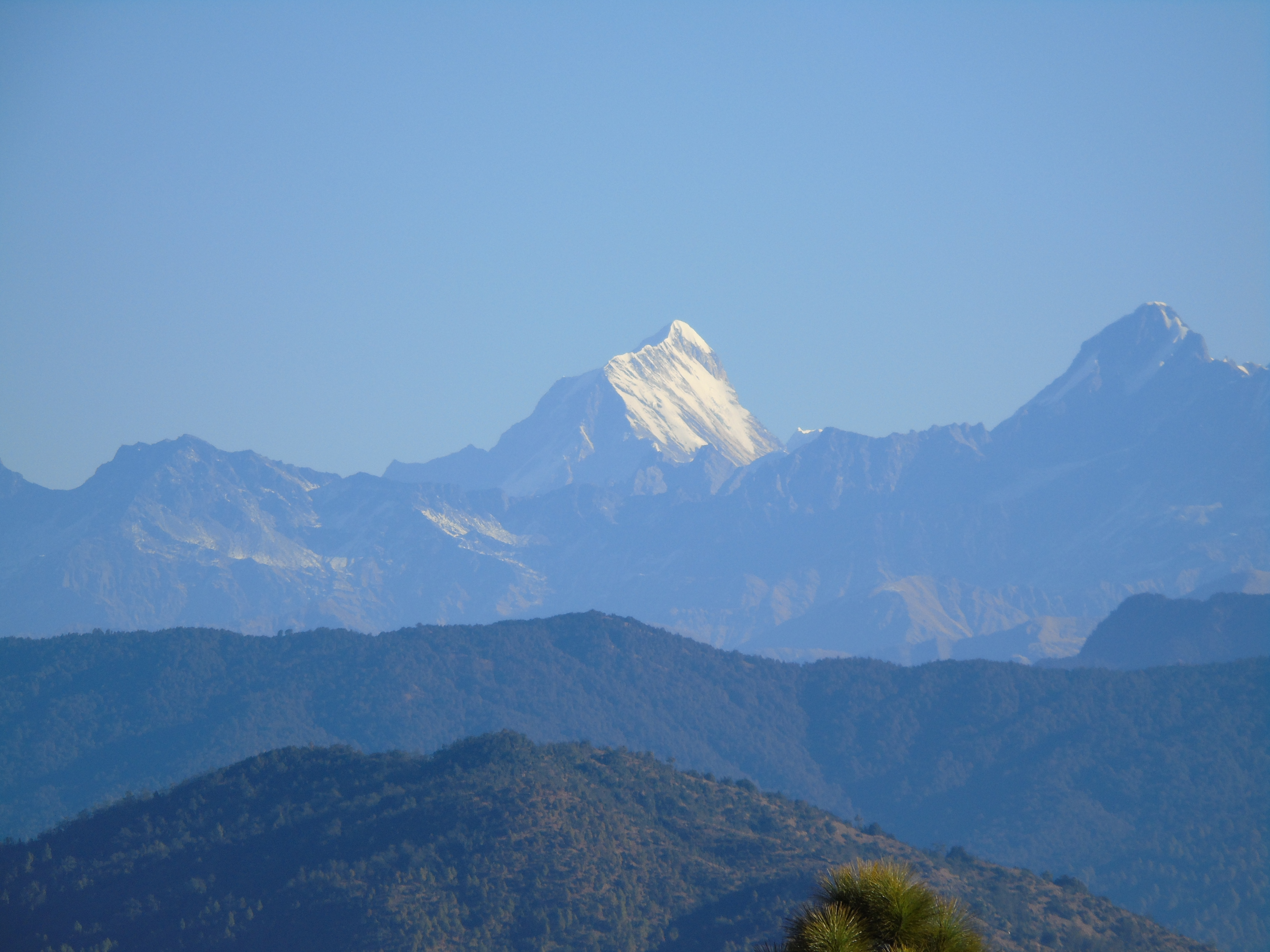
Dronagiri Parvat

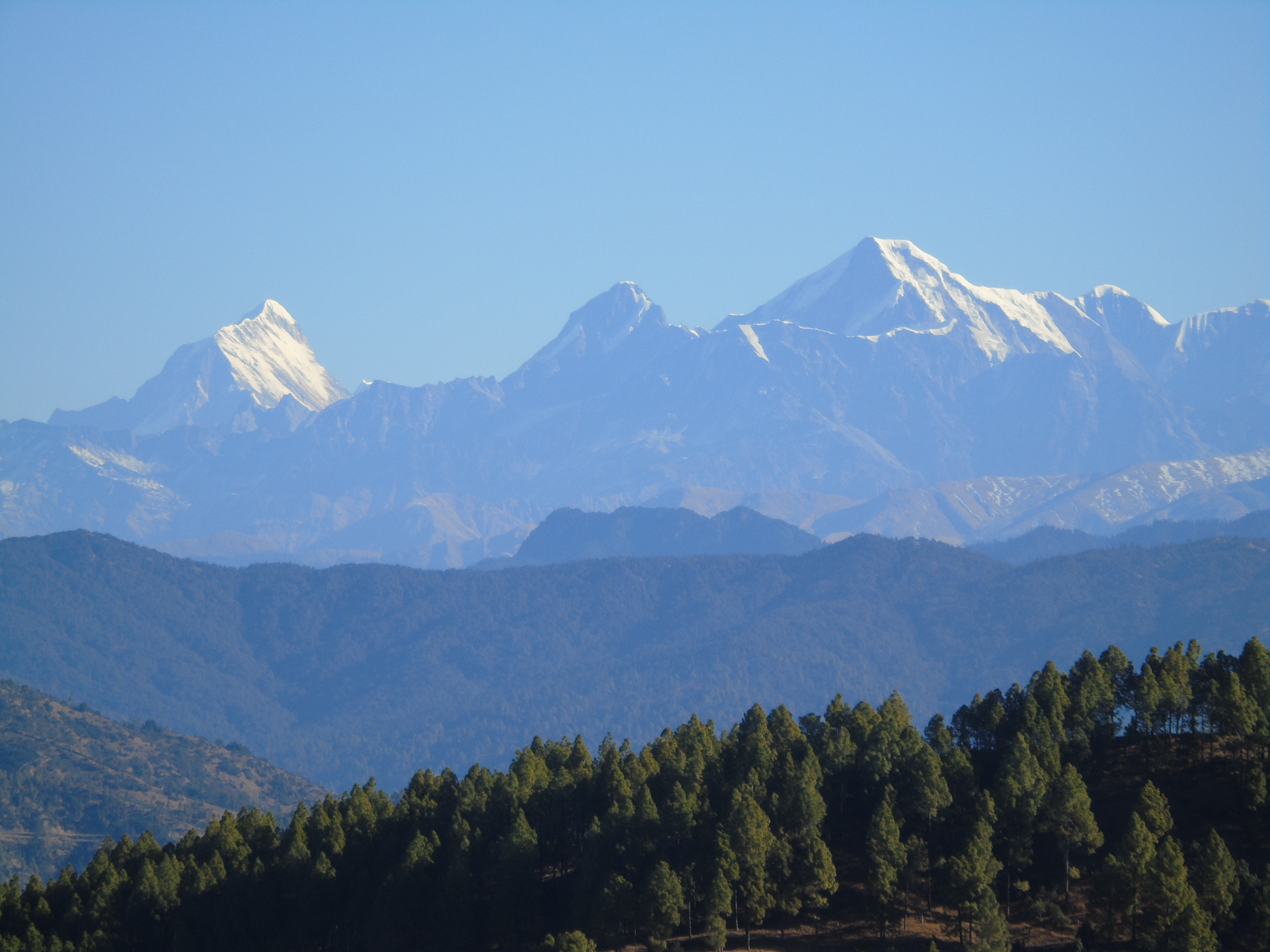
Dronagiri (Left) and Nanda Ghunti (Right)

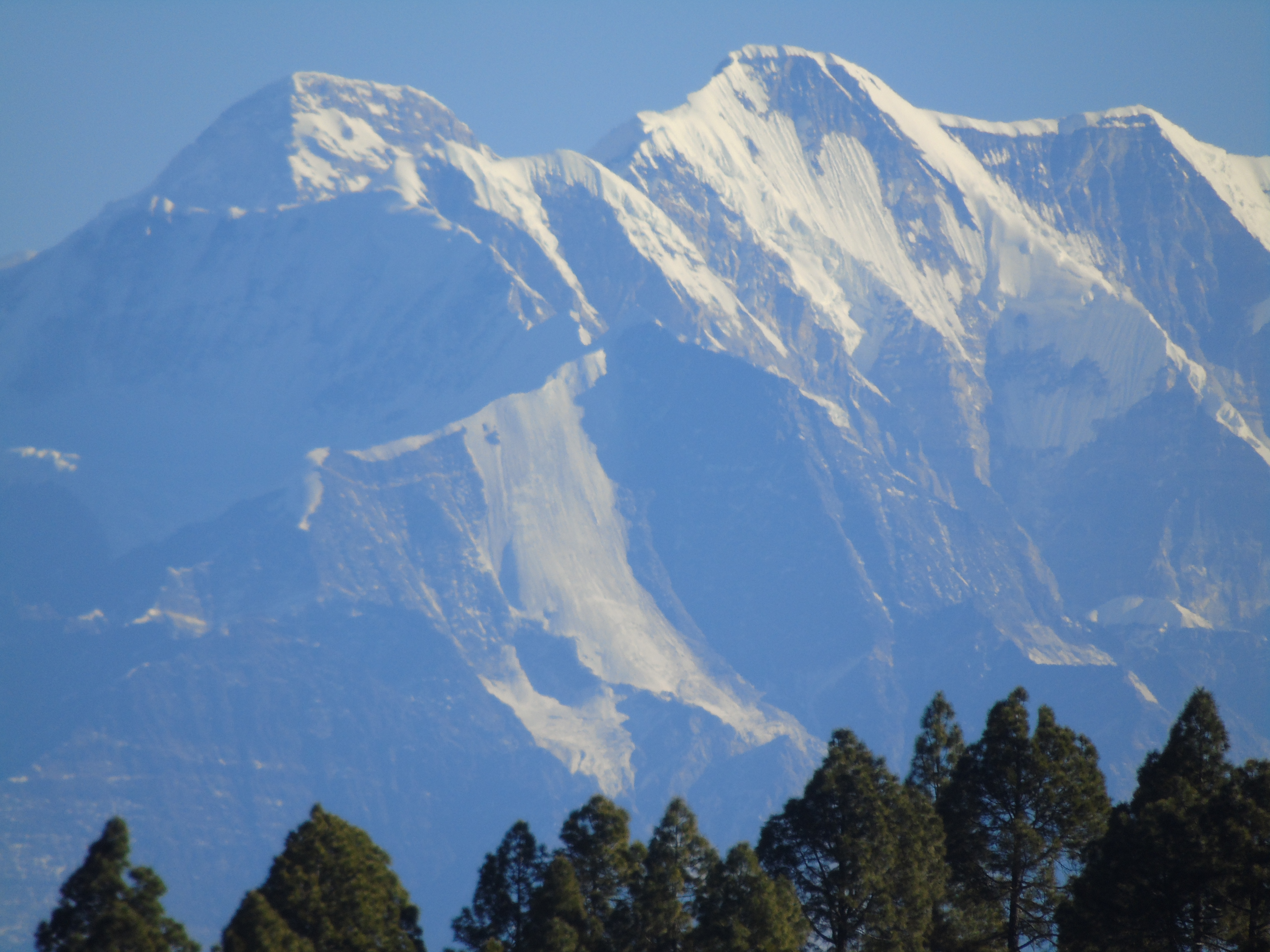
Mrigthuni

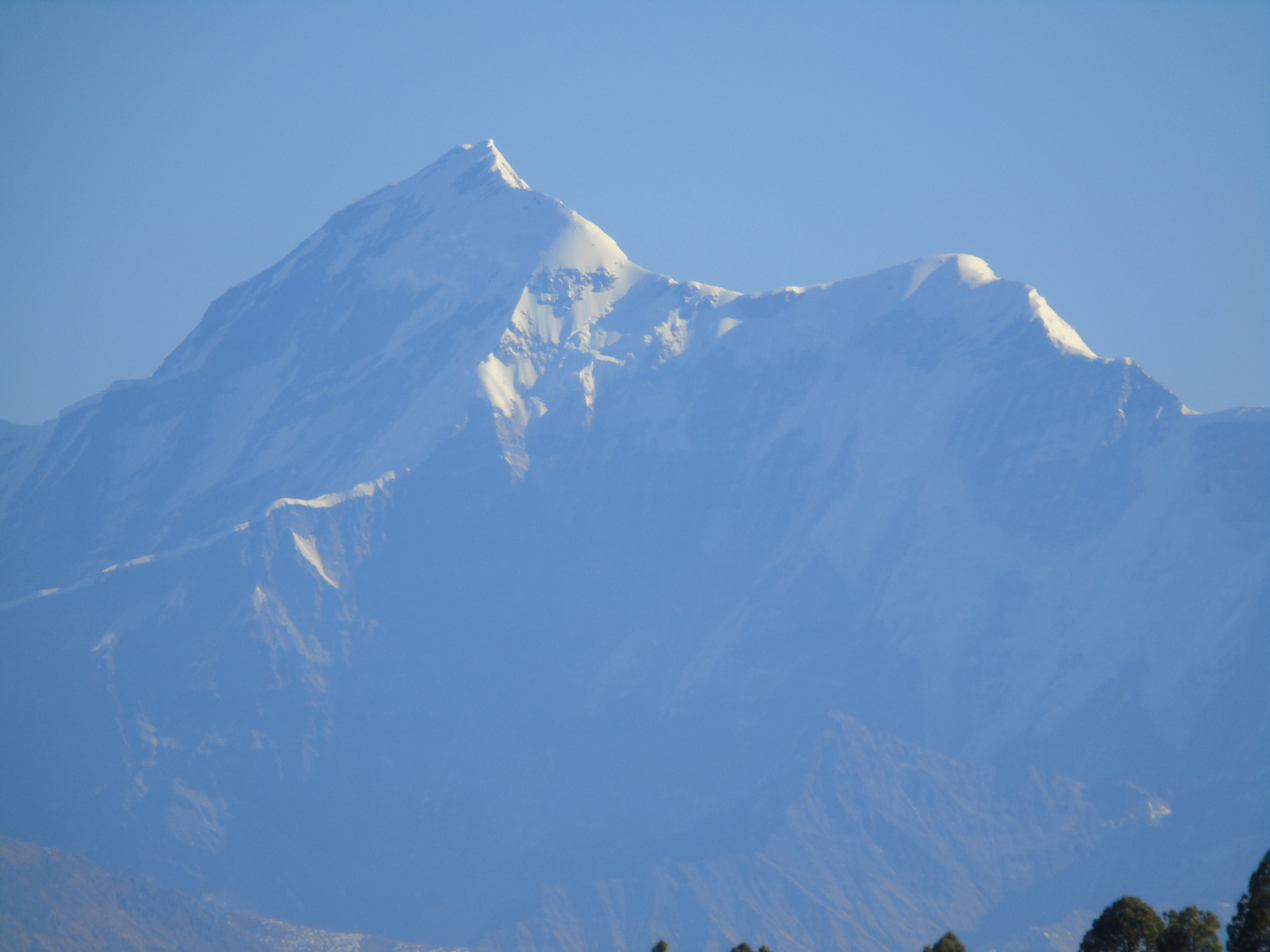
Trishul

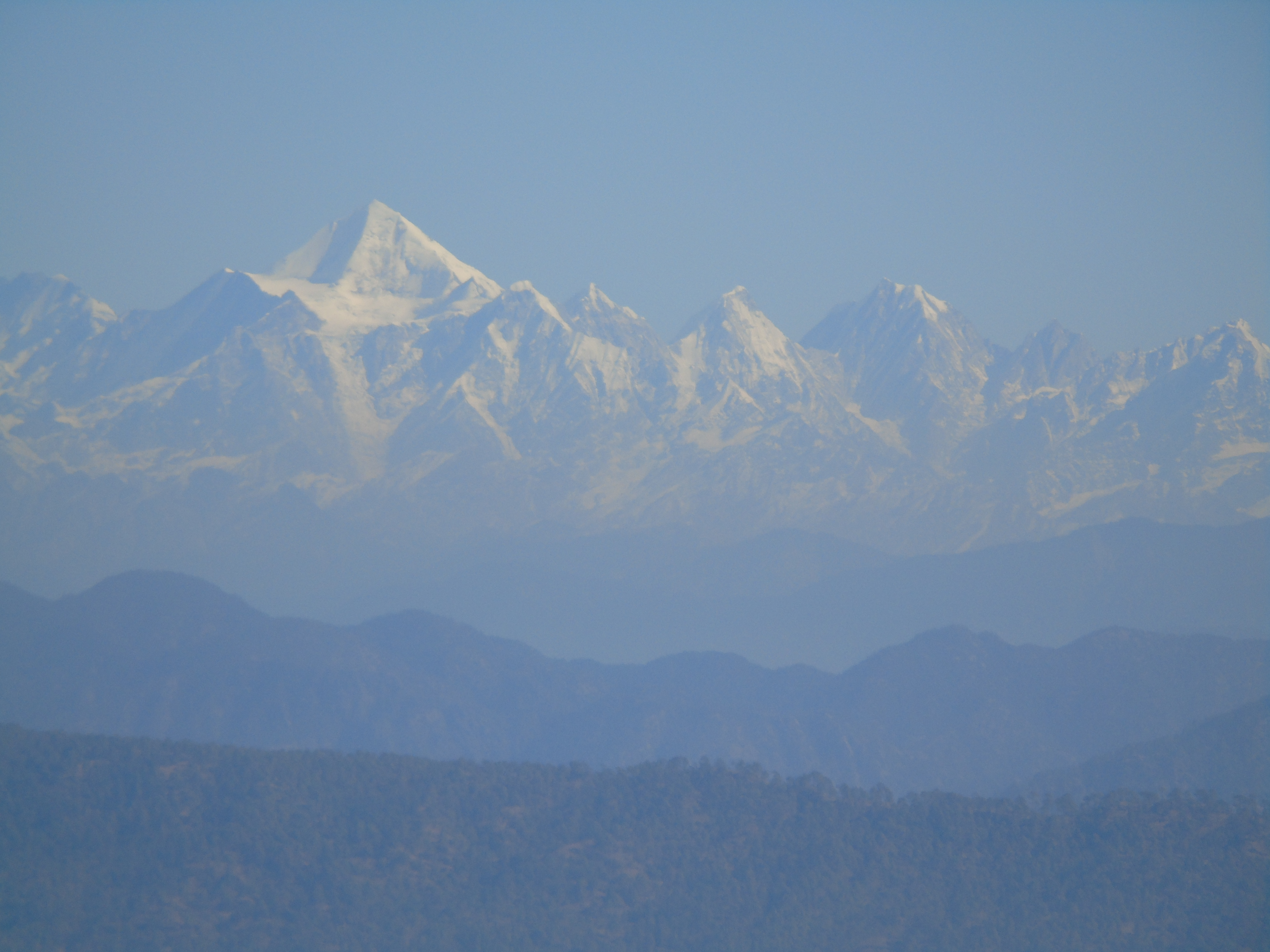
Panchachuli

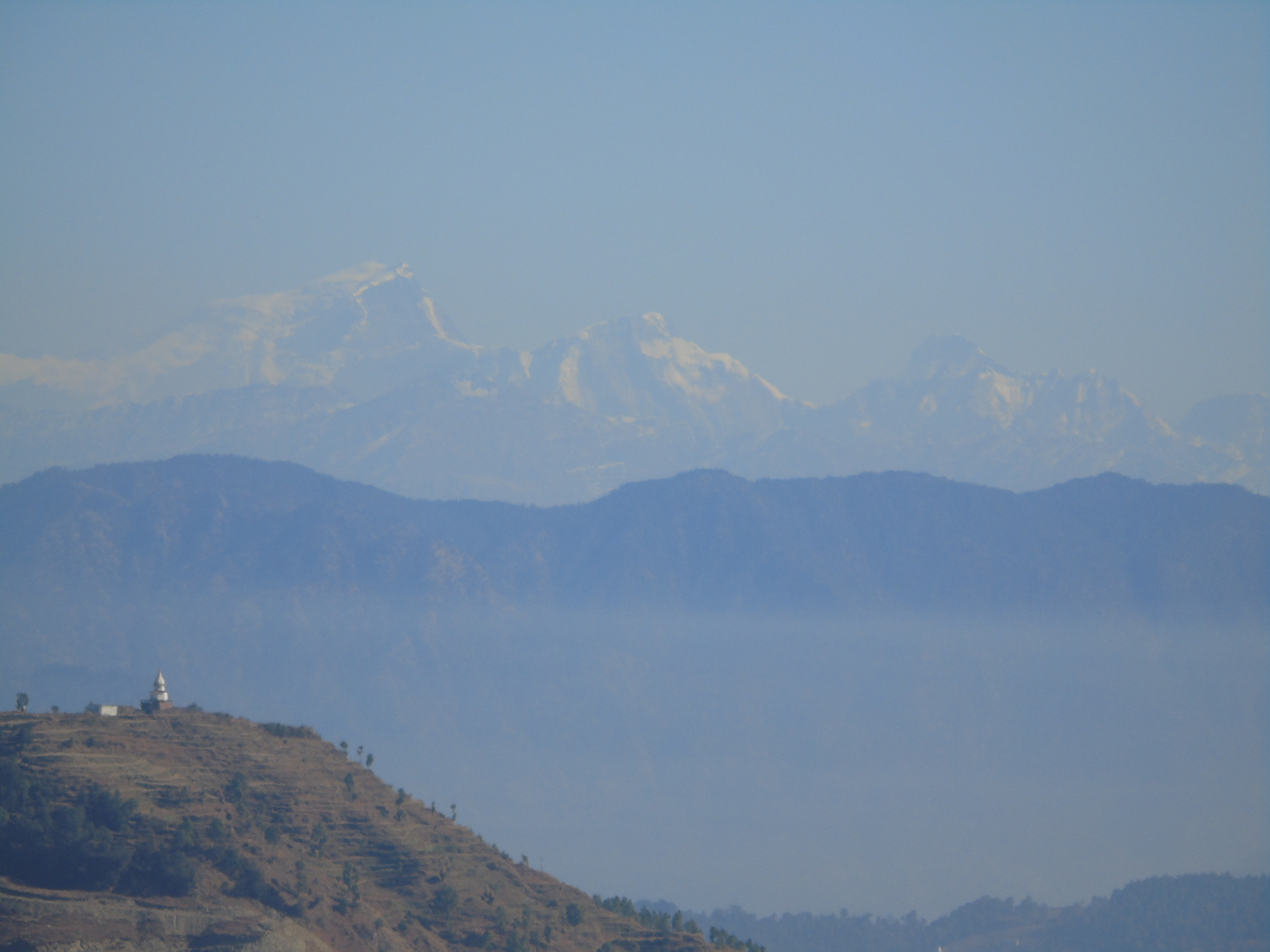
Jethi Bahurani peak in western Nepal

== Nearby places ==
This region remains almost unexplored as compared to other tourist circuits of Uttarakhand, more specifically the Garhwal region. Outsiders coming to this place have a lot to see. They can visit Jogimarhi (a virtually unknown hill station in the region), Bindeshwar Mahadev (Not to be confused with Binsar Mahadev near Ranikhet), Deeba mata temples (The upper and the lower Deeba), Gauni Chheeda on NH-121 (Gauni falls), Gujrugarhi temple and historical caves, and lot of high hills for jungle treks.
