= Kalinka, Russia =

Kalinka (Russian: Калинка) is the name of several rural localities in Russia:

- Kalinka, Khabarovsk Krai, a selo in Khabarovsky District of Khabarovsk Krai; 48°25′58″N 135°25′27″E
- Kalinka, Samara Oblast, a settlement in Volzhsky District of Samara Oblast; 52°59′06″N 50°10′24″E
