= Kalinka (artist) =

Marc Vincent Kalinka
- Born: 1968 (age 57–58); Milan
- Known for: Videoart, Performance
- Notable work: Still. Nothing, iluvyou, The many me. Who is the real Marc Kalinka, Dancing Kamasutra

Marc Vincent Kalinka was born in 1968 in Milan. He is an Italo-Russian artist who began his career as a visual artist in 2003 with research on personality alterations producing the works “Ham let it be” and “Who is supposed to be who”, where physical and language techniques were used to build a new form of communication through modified states of the personality.

== Recent exhibitions (in brief) ==
"inCollectionthree", inCollectionthree - Humanity, Pinacoteca Comunale “Carlo Contini”, ORISTANO (Italy), “Yona Friedman: Genesis of a vision”, Archizoom Gallery, EPFL, Lausanne, Switzerland, "I miss my enemies", 1 June - 1 July 2011, 54th International Art Exhibition, Venice Biennale 2011, "I miss my enemies", 1 June - 1 July 2011, 54th International Art Exhibition, Venice Biennale 2011, "The Imperial Gardens of Russia. Fourth International Festival", 26 May - 6 June 2011, "Consequences: being born in a bubbling babel." - Solo Show, Zürich 15 May - 21 June 2011, "Club21 - Remaking the scene" - London 13-23 Oct. 2010, during Frieze Art Fair, Loop Barcelona 2010- "The Displaced Gaze", Just Madrid 2010 - "Just 20", curated by Oxana Maleeva of Art Apart for the Tatiana Kourochkina Art Gallery (Barcelone), Sardegna Arte Fiera in Cagliari "Sound surroundings", Milan Triennal Museum, Incontemporanea, ArtVerona International Art Fair "Wall have ears" by Steve Piccolo, Coldon Nowhere Gallery N.Y. "Private visions", Theatre and art festival of Milan “Madrigale”, “Bang Bang” by Steve Piccolo, project promoted by the province of Milan. He also participated in two Moscow Biennals of Contemporary Art in 2005 and 2007 and in the parallel programme of the 52nd Venice Biennale of Contemporary Art in 2007.

== Artistic style ==
Performances and videos are his basic means of representation. His themes are mainly social, described using physical actions, symbols, words. In his works he describes the misery of a world that man continues to destroy and rebuild. He talks about the waste of man's time and life achieving absolutely nothing ("Still. Nothing"), or the difficulty to communicate to people how much you love them ("iluvyou"), the difficulty to live together or alone ("in or out"), the many different sides of our personality and their influence on our way of living and behaving (The many me or who is the real Marc Kalinka).

But his research is not based only on videos. Kalinka also works and builds devices and sculptures - such as traffic lights "Sveta4", modified TV-stereos, doorphones "Ding dong to my country", "My personal holy family", and many others - for containing and showing his video works. Objects normally made from everyday use, customized, transformed, and sometimes deprived of their usual purpose, are used for showing his videos, which often have a sense only inside their containers.

They represent complete and stand-alone installations, sometimes objects, sometimes sculptures, ready to work.

Besides the production of videos and installations, Kalinka produces prints such as "More", "9 months to grow", "No country for stupid men", "Kalinka per metre".
