= Kalinka system =

Kalinka is a monitoring system developed by Russia’s Center for Unmanned Systems and Technologies (CBST) which can detect Ukrainian drones. Apparently it can detect Starlink stationary and moving communication nodes and terminals.
