= Nainidanda =

Community Development Block in Uttarakhand, India

- Community development block
- Interactive map of Nainidanda
- Country: India
- State: Uttarakhand
- District: Pauri Garhwal district
- Tehsil: Dhumakot

Population (2011)
  - Total: 32,937
- Time zone: UTC+5:30 (IST)

Nainidanda is a community development block in Pauri Garhwal district in the Indian state of Uttarakhand. It is one of the administrative blocks of the district and comprises rural settlements governed through the gram panchayat system.

== Geography ==
Nainidanda block is located in the Lower Himalayan Range of Pauri Garhwal district in the Garhwal Himalayas. Its landscape consists of hills, ridges, valleys and forested slopes, with villages distributed across the region.

== Demographics ==
According to the 2011 census of India, Nainidanda block had a population of 32,937, comprising 14,880 males and 18,057 females. The block had 8,035 households.

== Religious shrine ==
Maa Bungi Devi Temple is a Hindu temple located in Biyasi Valli village, in the Nainidanda block of Pauri Garhwal district, Uttarakhand, India. The temple is dedicated to the Hindu goddess Bungi Devi, and is situated on a hill in the surrounding mountainous area.

== Transport and connectivity ==
Nainidanda block is connected to nearby towns and villages by road. National Highway 309A (NH 309A) provides connectivity to the wider region, linking parts of Pauri Garhwal district with the Kumaon region. State Highway 9 also serves the surrounding area.

== See also ==
- Dhumakot
- Rikhnikhal
