= Kalinka, Khabarovsk Krai =

Kalinka, Khabarovsk Krai Калинка
- Interactive map of Kalinka, Khabarovsk Krai
- Location of Kalinka, Khabarovsk Krai Kalinka, Khabarovsk Krai (Khabarovsk Krai)
- Coordinates: 48°25′59″N 135°25′27″E
- Country: Russia
- Federal subject: Khabarovsk Krai

Population
  - Estimate (2021): 1,880 )
- Time zone: UTC+10 (MSK+7)
- OKTMO ID: 08655460106

Kalinka (Russian: Калинка) is a rural locality (a selo) in the Khabarovsky District of Khabarovsk Krai, Russia. It forms part of the Sergeyevskoye Rural Settlement administrative unit.

== Geography ==
Kalinka is situated off the regional highway connecting Khabarovsk and Girin, roughly halfway between the villages of Topolevo and Sergeyevka. The locality is positioned near the Kalinka Airfield, a former military airbase that now functions as a regional airfield for civil and recreational aviation.

== History ==
The settlement was established alongside the construction of the local military airfield. Until 1963, the locality did not possess an official distinctive name and was designated administratively as the "Settlement of the Tenth Site" (Russian: посёлок Десятого участка), referencing its positional assignment within the regional military infrastructure. It was renamed Kalinka in 1963 during a wave of geographical standardization in the Khabarovsk region.

- 2002 Census: 2,755 inhabitants
- 2010 Census: 2,213 inhabitants
- 2021 Census: 1,860 inhabitants
