= Deeba Danda =

Peak in Uttarakhand, India

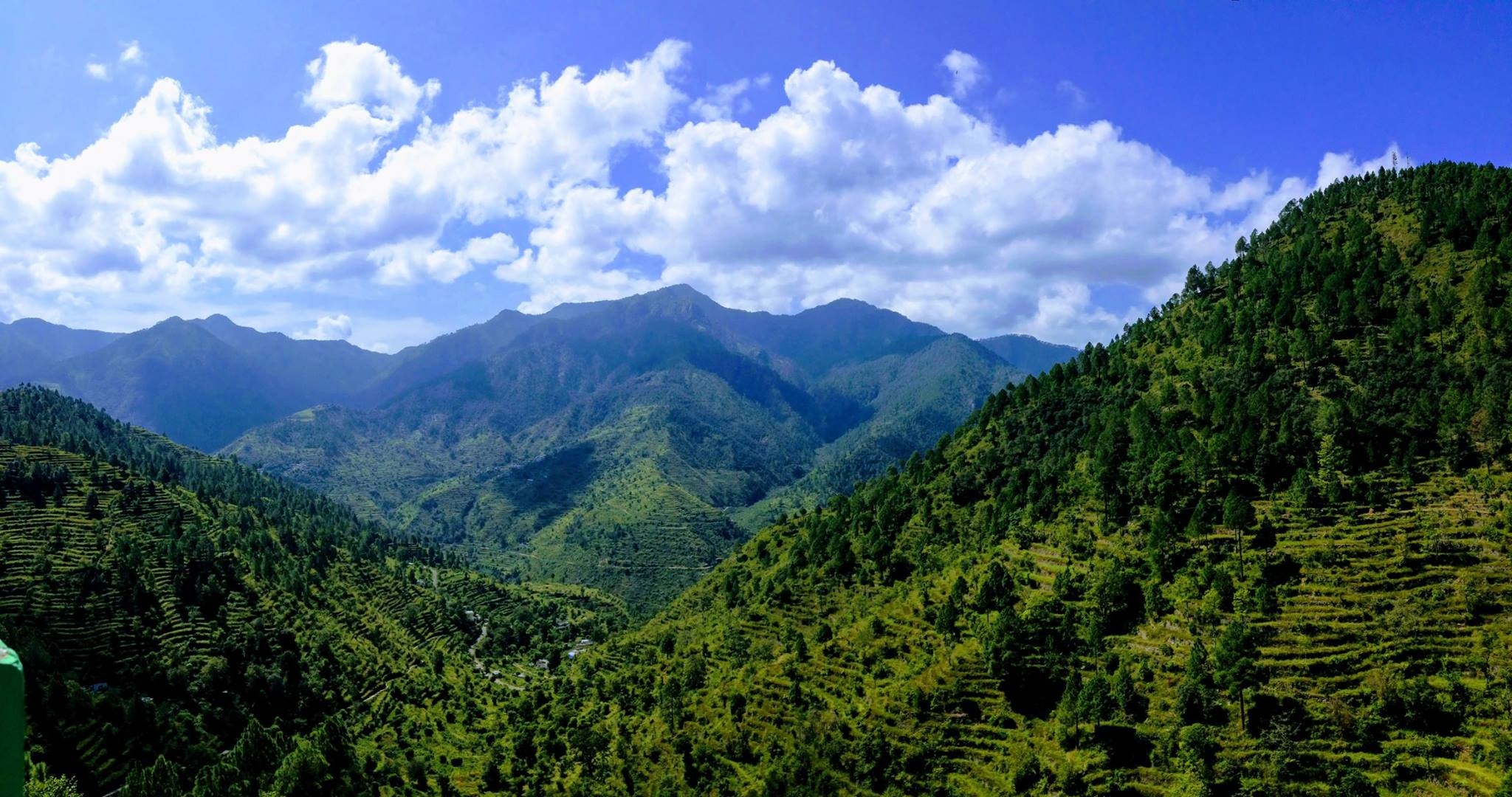
- Deeba Range on a cloudy day, as seen from Bironkhal, Pauri Garhwal

Highest point
- Peak: Deeba Danda
- Elevation: 2,670 m (8,760 ft)
- Coordinates: 29°47′26″N 79°00′46″E

Dimensions
- Length: 15 km (9.3 mi)
- Width: 2 km (1.2 mi)

Naming
- Etymology: named after Goddess Deeba
- Native name: दीबा रेंज (Garhwali)

Geography
- Location within Uttarakhand Location within India
- Country: India
- State: Uttarakhand
- Region: Pauri Garhwal
- Settlement: Dhumakot
- Parent range: Deeba Range

Geology
- Rock type: Fold mountains from Plate tectonics

Deeba Danda is a peak in the Patti Khatli region of Pauri Garhwal district, Uttarakhand, India. It is 2,670 metres (8,760 ft) high and is a part of the Diba Range, which forms the southern boundary of the Nayar Valley.

== Etymology ==
Deeba Danda is named after Deeba, a major goddess of the region (Malla Salan pargana of Pauri Garhwal) whereas "Danda" in the Salani dialect of the Garhwali language means "a high hill".

According to local beliefs, Deeba was a woman living at the hilltop centuries ago. She would warn the surrounding villagers by giving a loud shout ("Dhavadi") whenever Gorkha or Katyuri raiders were approaching. The hilltop has a shrine dedicated to the Diba.

== Geography ==
Deeba Danda is a flattened mountain-top with panoramic views of surrounding hills, valleys and the Himalayas. It is in the middle of the Deeba Range at an average altitude of 2500 metres, the highest point in Patti Khatli. Yamunotri peak in Northwest Garhwal and Trisul range in Eastern Garhwal, along with smaller peaks of the Kumaon division and Nepal, are visible.

Deeba Danda is surrounded by dense forests of Kharsu oak, Moru oak, Anyar, Rhododendron and other broad-leaved Himalayan tree species. The forest contains many species of herbs, shrubs and creepers, many of which possess medicinal qualities. The dense forests of Diba Range which extends 15 to 20 km from west to east. They are home to numerous birds and mammal species.

=== Climate ===
Deeba Danda experiences a subtropical highland climate just like other Himalayan and Sub-Himalayan regions. It has a pleasant and cool climate in summer. Monsoon brings heavy rains and with it comes lush greenery. It gets very cold in winters, heavy snowfall is common. The region receives bright sunshine during the winter since the skies are clear. Temperature ranges from 10 to 25 degrees Celsius in summer and from -5 to 15 degrees Celsius in winter.

== Image gallery ==
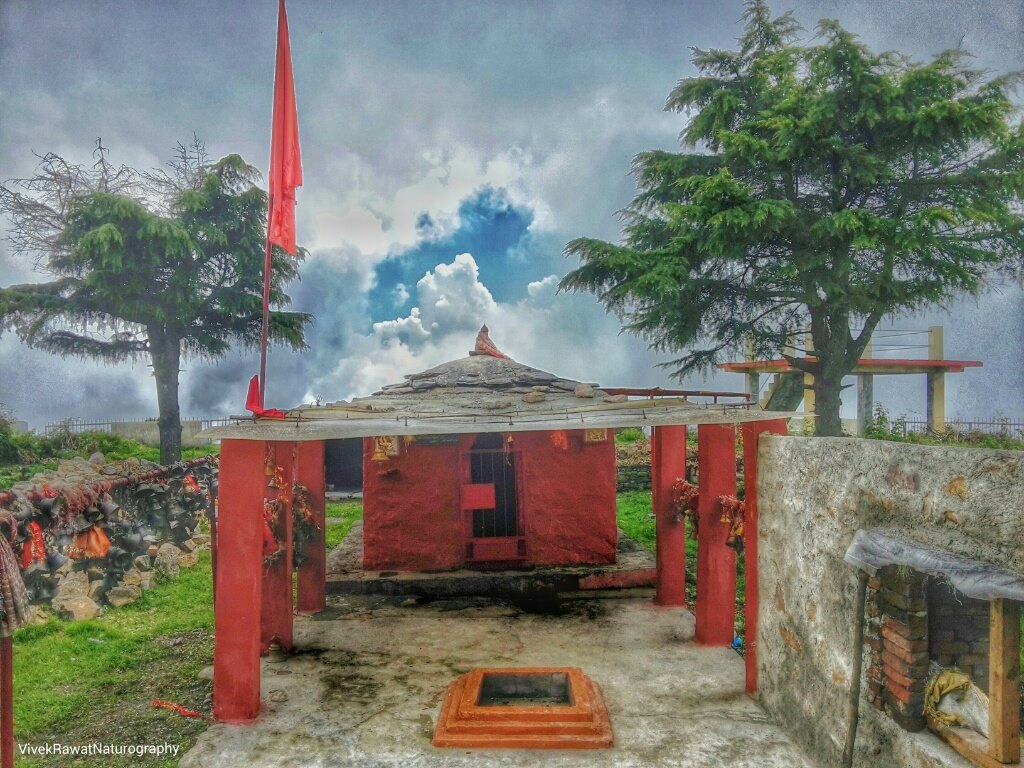
Temple of Goddess Diba at the summit

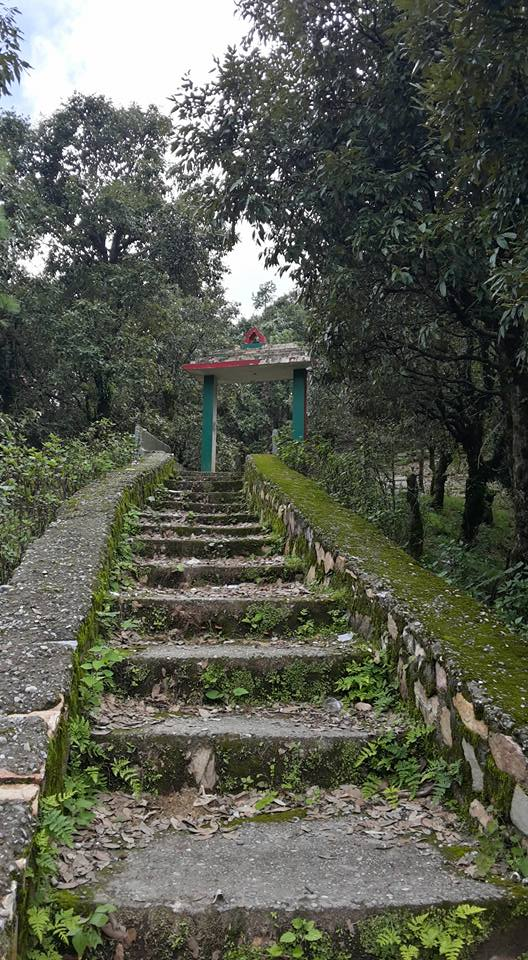
Starting point of the trek to Diba Danda

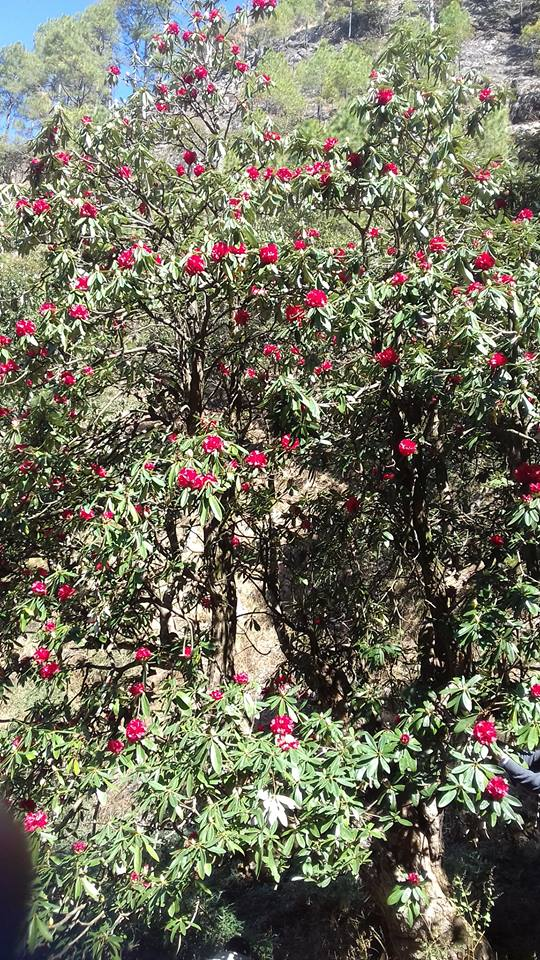
Rhodendrons blooming in Diba range

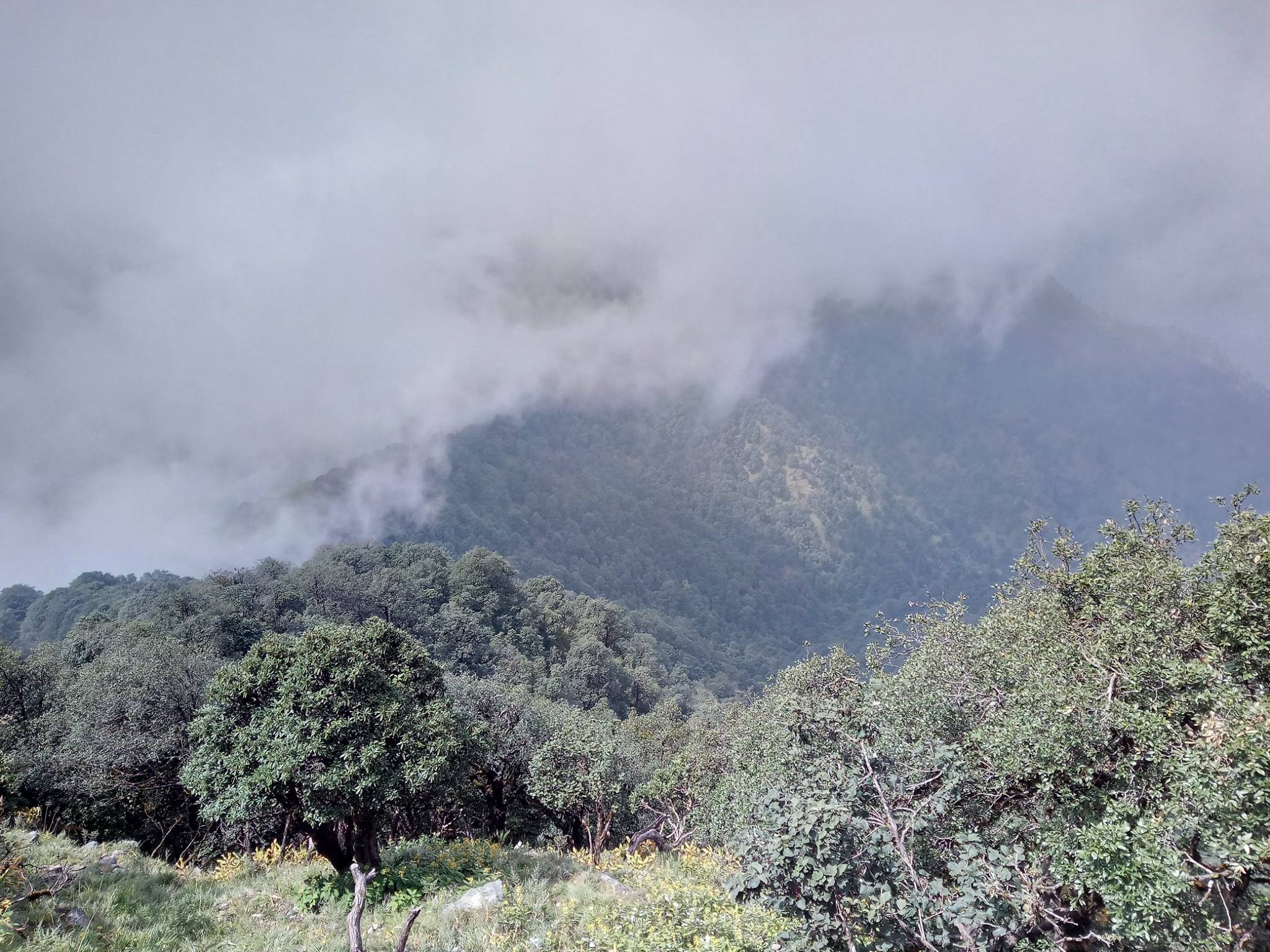
Forests of Diba range

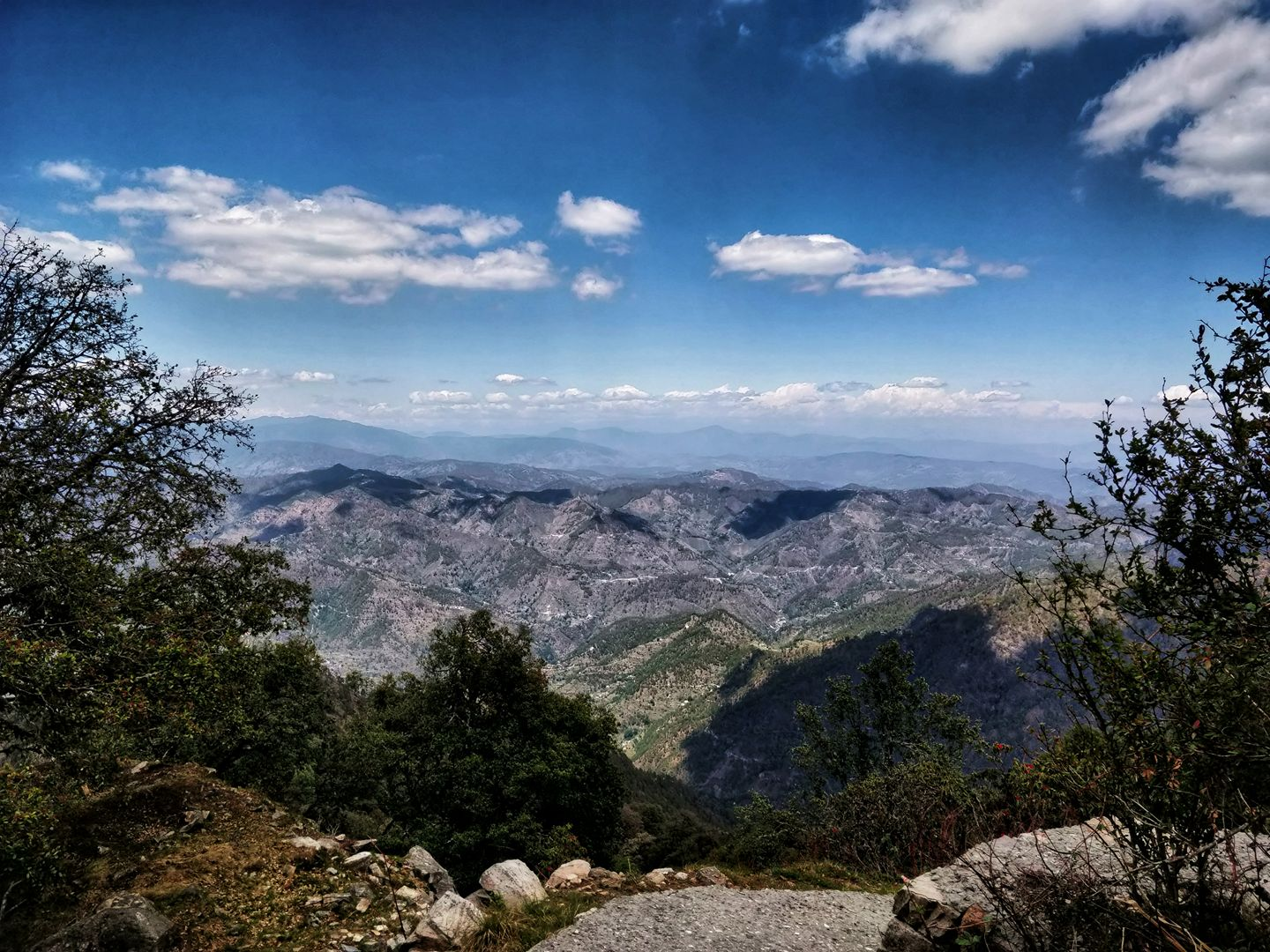
Looking towards South from the summit
