= List of urban local bodies in Uttarakhand =

The following is a list of the urban local bodies in the Indian state of Uttarakhand.

== List of municipal corporations in Uttarakhand ==
S. No.	Municipal corporation	District	Last election held	Winning party
1	Dehradun	Dehradun	2025	Bharatiya Janata Party
2	Rishikesh	Dehradun	2025	Bharatiya Janata Party
3	Haridwar	Haridwar	2025	Bharatiya Janata Party
4	Roorkee	Haridwar	2025	Bharatiya Janata Party
5	Kotdwar	Pauri Garhwal	2025	Bharatiya Janata Party
6	Srinagar	Pauri Garhwal	2025	Independent
7	Haldwani	Nainital	2025	Bharatiya Janata Party
8	Kashipur	Udham Singh Nagar	2025	Bharatiya Janata Party
9	Rudrapur	Udham Singh Nagar	2025	Bharatiya Janata Party
10	Pithoragarh	Pithoragarh	2025	Bharatiya Janata Party
11	Almora	Almora	2025	Bharatiya Janata Party

== List of municipal councils in Uttarakhand ==
S. No.	Municipal council	District	Last election held	Winning party
1	Chiliyanaula	Almora	2025	Indian National Congress
2	Bageshwar	Bageshwar	2025	Bharatiya Janata Party
3	Gauchar	Chamoli	2025	Indian National Congress
4	Gopeshwar	Chamoli	2025	Bharatiya Janata Party
5	Joshimath	Chamoli	2025	Indian National Congress
6	Karnaprayag	Chamoli	2025	Bharatiya Janata Party
7	Champawat	Champawat	2025	Bharatiya Janata Party
8	Lohaghat	Champawat	2025	Bharatiya Janata Party
9	Tanakpur	Champawat	2025	Bharatiya Janata Party
10	Doiwala	Dehradun	2025	Bharatiya Janata Party
11	Herbertpur	Dehradun	2025	Bharatiya Janata Party
12	Mussoorie	Dehradun	2025	Bharatiya Janata Party
13	Vikasnagar	Dehradun	2025	Indian National Congress
14	Laksar	Haridwar	2025	Bahujan Samaj Party
15	Manglaur	Haridwar	2025	Independent
16	Shivalik Nagar	Haridwar	2025	Bharatiya Janata Party
17	Bhowali	Nainital	2025	Indian National Congress
18	Nainital	Nainital	2025	Indian National Congress
19	Ramnagar	Nainital	2025	Independent
20	Kaladhungi	Nainital	2025	Independent
21	Bhimtal	Nainital	2025	Indian National Congress
22	Dugadda	Pauri Garhwal	2025	Independent
23	Pauri	Pauri Garhwal	2025	Independent
24	Dharchula	Pithoragarh	2025	Indian National Congress
25	Didihat	Pithoragarh	2025	Indian National Congress
26	Gangolihat	Pithoragarh	2025	Bharatiya Janata Party
27	Berinag	Pithoragarh	2025	Indian National Congress
28	Rudraprayag	Rudraprayag	2025	Independent
29	Chamba	Tehri Garhwal	2025	Bharatiya Janata Party
30	Devprayag	Tehri Garhwal	2025	Bharatiya Janata Party
31	Muni Ki Reti	Tehri Garhwal	2025	Independent
32	Narendranagar	Tehri Garhwal	2026	Bharatiya Janata Party
33	Tehri	Tehri Garhwal	2025	Independent
34	Bajpur	Udham Singh Nagar	2025	Indian National Congress
35	Gadarpur	Udham Singh Nagar	2025	Bharatiya Janata Party
36	Jaspur	Udham Singh Nagar	2025	Independent
37	Khatima	Udham Singh Nagar	2025	Bharatiya Janata Party
38	Kichha	Udham Singh Nagar	2026	Indian National Congress
39	Mahua Kheraganj	Udham Singh Nagar	2025	Independent
40	Nagla	Udham Singh Nagar	2025	Bharatiya Janata Party
41	Sirauli Kalan	Udham Singh Nagar	2026	Indian National Congress
42	Sitarganj	Udham Singh Nagar	2025	Bharatiya Janata Party
43	Barkot	Uttarkashi	2025	Independent
44	Chinyalisaur	Uttarkashi	2025	Independent
45	Uttarkashi	Uttarkashi	2025	Independent
46	Purola	Uttarkashi	2025	Indian National Congress

== List of nagar panchayats in Uttarakhand ==
S. No.	Nagar panchayat	District	Last election held	Winning party
1	Bhikiyasain	Almora	2025	Indian National Congress
2	Chaukhutia	Almora	2025	Bharatiya Janata Party
3	Dwarahat	Almora	2025	Indian National Congress
4	Garur	Bageshwar	2025	Indian National Congress
5	Kapkot	Bageshwar	2025	Bharatiya Janata Party
6	Badrinath	Chamoli	Interim administration	
7	Gairsain	Chamoli	2025	Indian National Congress
8	Nandaprayag	Chamoli	2025	Indian National Congress
9	Pipalkoti	Chamoli	2025	Independent
10	Pokhari	Chamoli	2025	Independent
11	Tharali	Chamoli	2025	Indian National Congress
12	Nandanagar	Chamoli	2025	Indian National Congress
13	Banbasa	Champawat	2025	Bharatiya Janata Party
14	Pati	Champawat	2026	Bharatiya Janata Party
15	Selakui	Dehradun	2025	Independent
16	Bhagwanpur	Haridwar	2025	Indian National Congress
17	Dhandera	Haridwar	2025	Independent
18	Imlikhera	Haridwar	2025	Independent
19	Jhabrera	Haridwar	2025	Indian National Congress
20	Landhaura	Haridwar	2025	Independent
21	Padali Gujjar	Haridwar	2025	Indian National Congress
22	Piran Kaliyar	Haridwar	2025	Bahujan Samaj Party
23	Rampur	Haridwar	2025	Independent
24	Sultanpur Adampur	Haridwar	2025	Indian National Congress
25	Lalkuan	Nainital	2025	Independent
26	Satpuli	Pauri Garhwal	2025	Indian National Congress
27	Swargashram	Pauri Garhwal	2025	Indian National Congress
28	Thalisain	Pauri Garhwal	2025	Indian National Congress
29	Munsyari	Pithoragarh	2025	Independent
30	Agastmuni	Rudraprayag	2025	Indian National Congress
31	Kedarnath	Rudraprayag	Interim administration	
32	Tilwara	Rudraprayag	2025	Bharatiya Janata Party
33	Guptakashi	Rudraprayag	2025	Bharatiya Janata Party
34	Ukhimath	Rudraprayag	2025	Independent
35	Chamiyala	Tehri Garhwal	2025	Bharatiya Janata Party
36	Gaja	Tehri Garhwal	2025	Independent
37	Ghansali	Tehri Garhwal	2025	Bharatiya Janata Party
38	Kirtinagar	Tehri Garhwal	2025	Bharatiya Janata Party
39	Lambgaon	Tehri Garhwal	2025	Bharatiya Janata Party
40	Tapovan	Tehri Garhwal	2025	Bharatiya Janata Party
41	Dineshpur	Udham Singh Nagar	2025	Bharatiya Janata Party
42	Garhinegi	Udham Singh Nagar	2026	Bharatiya Janata Party
43	Gularbhoj	Udham Singh Nagar	2025	Bharatiya Janata Party
44	Kelakhera	Udham Singh Nagar	2025	Independent
45	Lalpur	Udham Singh Nagar	2025	Bharatiya Janata Party
46	Mahua Dabra Haripura	Udham Singh Nagar	2025	Independent
47	Nanakmatta	Udham Singh Nagar	2025	Bharatiya Janata Party
48	Shaktigarh	Udham Singh Nagar	2025	Bharatiya Janata Party
49	Sultanpur	Udham Singh Nagar	2025	Bharatiya Janata Party
50	Gangotri	Uttarkashi	Interim administration	
51	Naugaon	Uttarkashi	2025	Bharatiya Janata Party

== List of cantonment boards in Uttarakhand ==
S. No.	Cantonment board	District	Last election held	Winning party
1	Almora	Almora	Cantonment administration	
2	Ranikhet	Almora	Cantonment administration	
3	Chakrata	Dehradun	Cantonment administration	
4	Clement Town	Dehradun	Cantonment administration	
5	Dehradun Cantonment	Dehradun	Cantonment administration	
6	Landour	Dehradun	Cantonment administration	
7	Roorkee Cantonment	Haridwar	Cantonment administration	
8	Nainital Cantonment	Nainital	Cantonment administration	
9	Lansdowne	Pauri Garhwal	Cantonment administration	

== District-wise summary ==
No.	District	Urban local bodies				Total
No.	District	Municipal corporations	Municipal councils	Nagar panchayats	Cantonment boards	Total
1	Almora	1	1	3	2	7
2	Bageshwar	0	1	2	0	3
3	Chamoli	0	4	7	0	11
4	Champawat	0	3	2	0	5
5	Dehradun	2	4	1	4	11
6	Haridwar	2	3	9	1	15
7	Nainital	1	5	1	1	8
8	Pauri Garhwal	2	2	3	1	8
9	Pithoragarh	1	4	1	0	6
10	Rudraprayag	0	1	5	0	6
11	Tehri Garhwal	0	5	6	0	11
12	Udham Singh Nagar	2	9	9	0	20
13	Uttarkashi	0	4	2	0	6
Total		11	46	51	9	117

== Elections ==
Elections to the urban local bodies in Uttarakhand are held once in five years, are conducted by Uttarakhand State Election Commission. Both direct and indirect elections apply for the urban local bodies.

== See also ==
- Local government in India
- Municipal governance in India
- Municipal elections in India
- List of municipal corporations in India
- List of cities in Uttarakhand by population
- List of cities in India by population
