= 2025 Uttarakhand local elections =

Uttarakhand Elections

2025 Uttarakhand municipal general elections
- 23 January 2025

1382 seats of the urban local bodies in Uttarakhand (Note: Not a single vote was cast in Ward no 2 of Tharali nagar panchayat and it remained vacant.)
- Turnout: 65.41% (▼4.38 pp)

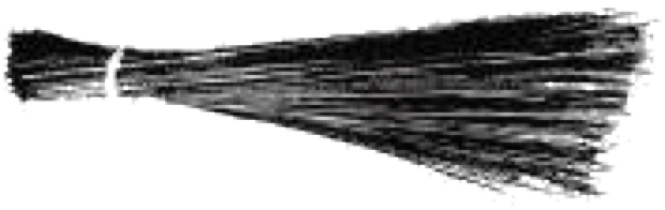

	First party	Second party	Third party
Leader	Mahendra Bhatt	Karan Mahara	Shishpal Singh
Party	BJP	INC	BSP
Leader since	2022	2022	2024
Last election	381 (Note: Includes combined figures of 2018 Uttarakhand local elections and 2019 Uttarakhand local elections's urban bodies.)	215 (Note: Includes combined figures of 2018 Uttarakhand local elections and 2019 Uttarakhand local elections's urban bodies.)	6 (Note: Includes combined figures of 2018 Uttarakhand local elections and 2019 Uttarakhand local elections's urban bodies.)
Seats won	499	195	4
Seat change	▲118	▼20	▼2
	Fourth party	Fifth party	Sixth party
Leader	Sawinderjeet Singh Kaler	Kashi Singh Airy	none
Party	AAP	UKD	Independent
Leader since	2022	2022
Last election	2	1	611 (Note: Includes combined figures of 2018 Uttarakhand local elections and 2019 Uttarakhand local elections's urban bodies.)
Seats won	2	1	680
Seat change	Steady	Steady	▲69

The 2025 Uttarakhand Municipal general elections were held on 23 January 2025 to elect members of 100 municipalities in the state. Elections were conducted in all of the 11 municipal corporations, 43 municipal councils, and 47 nagar panchayats and the results were declared on 25 January 2025.

The elections were postponed for municipal council of Narendranagar and notified area council of Pati and Garhinegi. They were held later on 9 June 2026. Elections in Kichha and Sirauli Kalan were held on 22 September 2026.

Elections were not conducted in the nagar panchayats of Badrinath, Kedarnath and Gangotri due to their status of temporary settlements. Local interim administration councils administer these three pilgrimage sites for a period of six months during the summers. Out of the 11 corporations in the local bodies, five were unreserved, three were reserved for the women candidates and one each for Other Backward Class, Other Backward Class Women and Scheduled Caste.

The BJP won a decisive victory and made notable gains, securing 10 out of 11 municipal corporations and winning the maximum number of chairperson seats in municipal councils and notified area councils. Congress, on the other hand failed to win any municipal corporation but managed to win some municipal councils and performed well in notified area councils. Independents dominated the election as they won the maximum number of seats owing to their strong performance in the wards of municipal councils and notified area councils. BSP also managed to win 1 municipal council and 1 notified area council, though its number of ward members decreased.

== Background ==
The schedule of the tenure of urban local bodies in Uttarakhand excluding Roorkee, Bajpur, Selakui, Badrinath, Kedarnath, and Gangotri was supposed to end on 2 December 2023. However, elections were delayed due to the delay in delimitation of the constituencies and the publication of rolls. The term of the above-mentioned municipalities also ended on 22 November 2024. The election was held on 23 January and the results were declared on 25 January. The state election commission announced that elections will be held in all urban bodies barring Kichha, Narendranagar, Sirauli Kalan, Pati and Garhinegi. The elections in Kichha, Narendranagar, Sirauli Kalan, Pati and Garhinegi were expected to be held later alongside the panchayat elections later this year, but were postponed. The elections for Narendranagar, Pati, Kichha, Sirauli Kalan and Garhnegi were held in 2026.

== Election schedule ==
The election schedule was announced by the state election commission on 23 December 2024.

Poll Event	Schedule
Notification Date	27 December 2024
Last Date for filing nomination	30 December 2024
Scrutiny of nomination	31 December 2024
Last Date for Withdrawal of nomination	2 January 2025
Allotment of Symbols	3 January 2025
Date of Poll	23 January 2025
Date of Counting of Votes	25 January 2025

== Parties and Alliance ==
Alliance/Party	Flag	Symbol	Leader	Seats Contested
Bharatiya Janata Party			Mahendra Bhatt	93
Indian National Congress			Karan Mahra	89
Bahujan Samaj Party			Shishpal Singh	21

== Candidates ==
=== Mayoral Election ===
In a significant move, both major parties denied tickets to their sitting mayors. No incumbent mayor stood for re-election.

No.	Municipal Corporation	District	BJP candidate	INC candidate
1	Dehradun Municipal Corporation	Dehradun	Saurabh Thapliyal	Virendra Pokhriyal
2	Rishikesh Municipal Corporation	Dehradun	Shambhu Paswan	Deepak Jatav
3	Haridwar Municipal Corporation	Haridwar	Kiran Jaisal	Amresh Baliyan
4	Roorkee Municipal Corporation	Haridwar	Anita Agarwal	Pooja Gupta
5	Kotdwar Municipal Corporation	Pauri Garhwal	Shailendra Singh Rawat	Ranjana Rawat
6	Srinagar Municipal Corporation	Pauri Garhwal	Asha Upadhyaya	Meena Rawat
7	Almora Municipal Corporation	Almora	Ajay Verma	Bhairav Goswami
8	Pithoragarh Municipal Corporation	Pithoragarh	Kalpana Devlal	Anju Lunthi
9	Haldwani Municipal Corporation	Nainital	Gajraj Singh Bisht	Lalit Joshi
10	Rudrapur Municipal Corporation	Udham Singh Nagar	Vikas Sharma	Mohan Khera
11	Kashipur Municipal Corporation	Udham Singh Nagar	Deepak Bali	Sandeep Sehgal

== Voter turnout ==
District	Seats (Mayors and chairpersons)	Turnout (%)
Uttarkashi	5	61
Chamoli	10	66.64
Rudraprayag	5	71.15 (highest)
Tehri Garhwal	9	61.48
Dehradun	7	55 (lowest)
Haridwar	14	65
Pauri Garhwal	7	66.05
Pithoragarh	6	64.75
Bageshwar	3	67.19
Almora	6	63
Champawat	4	64
Nainital	7	69.78
Udham Singh Nagar	17	70.6
Total	100	65.41

== Results ==
=== Party-wise ===
Municipal general election results
Party	Mayors/Chairpersons		Corporators/Ward Members		Total	
Party	Seats	+/-	Seats	+/-	Seats	+/-
Bharatiya Janata Party	42	▲8 (Note: Includes combined figures of 2018 Uttarakhand local elections and 2019 Uttarakhand local elections's urban bodies.)	457	▲110	499	▲118
Indian National Congress	27	(Note: Includes combined figures of 2018 Uttarakhand local elections and 2019 Uttarakhand local elections's urban bodies.)	168	▼20	195	▼20
Bahujan Samaj Party	2	▲1 (Note: Includes combined figures of 2018 Uttarakhand local elections and 2019 Uttarakhand local elections's urban bodies.)	2	▼3	4	▼2
Aam Aadmi Party	0	Steady	2	Steady	2	Steady
Uttarakhand Kranti Dal	0	Steady	1	Steady	1	Steady
Others (Note: Includes the seat won by the Samajwadi Party in the last election which it lost in this election.)	0	Steady	0	▼1	0	▼1
Independent	29	▲4 (Note: Includes combined figures of 2018 Uttarakhand local elections and 2019 Uttarakhand local elections's urban bodies.)	651	▲65	680	▲69
Total	100	▲13 (Note: Includes combined figures of 2018 Uttarakhand local elections and 2019 Uttarakhand local elections's urban bodies.)	1282	▲152 (Note: Includes combined figures of 2018 Uttarakhand local elections and 2019 Uttarakhand local elections's urban bodies.)	1382 (Note: Not a single vote was cast in Ward no 2 of Tharali nagar panchayat and it remained vacant.)	▲165 (Note: Includes combined figures of 2018 Uttarakhand local elections and 2019 Uttarakhand local elections's urban bodies.)

=== Results of mayors/chairpersons ===
Division	Seats				
Division	Seats	BJP	INC	BSP	IND
Municipal Corporation	11	10	0	0	1
Municipal Council	43	17	12	1	13
Notified Area council	46	15	15	1	15
Total	100	42	27	2	29

=== Results of ward members ===
Division	Seats				
Division	Seats	BJP	INC	Others	IND
Municipal Corporation	540	261	85	2	192
Municipal Council	444	129	46	0	269
Notified Area council	298	67	37	3	190
Total	1282 (Note: Not a single vote was cast in Ward no 2 of Tharali nagar panchayat and it remained vacant.)	457	168	5	651

=== Municipal Corporation Mayor ===
Municipal Corporation Mayoral election
S. No.	Municipal Corporation	District	Winning candidate	Winning party	Runner up candidate	Runner up	Margin
1	Dehradun Municipal Corporation	Dehradun	Saurabh Thapliyal	Bharatiya Janata Party	Virendra Pokhriyal	Indian National Congress	1,05,694
2	Rishikesh Municipal Corporation (SC)	Dehradun	Shambhu Paswan	Bharatiya Janata Party	Dinesh Chandra	Independent	3,020
3	Haridwar Municipal Corporation (OBC-W)	Haridwar	Kiran Jaisal	Bharatiya Janata Party	Amresh Baliyan	Indian National Congress	28,570
4	Roorkee Municipal Corporation (W)	Haridwar	Anita Agrawal	Bharatiya Janata Party	Shreshtha Rana	Independent	2,851
5	Kotdwar Municipal Corporation	Pauri Garhwal	Shailendra Singh Rawat	Bharatiya Janata Party	Ranjana Rawat	Indian National Congress	14,231
6	Srinagar Municipal Corporation (W)	Pauri Garhwal	Arti Bhandari	Independent	Asha Upadhyay	Bharatiya Janata Party	1,639
7	Almora Municipal Corporation (OBC)	Almora	Ajay Verma	Bharatiya Janata Party	Bhairav Goswami	Indian National Congress	2,479
8	Pithoragarh Municipal Corporation (W)	Pithoragarh	Kalpana Devlal	Bharatiya Janata Party	Monika Mahar	Independent	17
9	Haldwani Municipal Corporation	Nainital	Gajraj Singh Bisht	Bharatiya Janata Party	Lalit Joshi	Indian National Congress	3,894
10	Rudrapur Municipal Corporation	Udham Singh Nagar	Vikas Sharma	Bharatiya Janata Party	Mohan Khera	Indian National Congress	12,921
11	Kashipur Municipal Corporation	Udham Singh Nagar	Deepak Bali	Bharatiya Janata Party	Sandeep Sehgal	Indian National Congress	5,158

==== Ward-wise results ====
Corporation Election Data Published by State Election Commission of Uttarakhand

No.	Municipal Corporation	Total Wards			
No.	Municipal Corporation	Total Wards	BJP	INC	Others
1	Almora Municipal Corporation	40	15	0	25
2	Dehradun Municipal Corporation	100	63	24	13
3	Haldwani Municipal Corporation	60	23	2	35
4	Haridwar Municipal Corporation	60	40	15	5
5	Kashipur Municipal Corporation	40	19	8	13
6	Kotdwar Municipal Corporation	40	18	9	13
7	Pithoragarh Municipal Corporation	40	5	0	35
8	Rishikesh Municipal Corporation	40	18	6	16
9	Roorkee Municipal Corporation	40	24	2	14
10	Rudrapur Municipal Corporation	40	21	14	5
11	Srinagar Municipal Corporation	40	16	6	18
	Total	540	259	86	195

=== Municipal Council Chairpersons ===
Municipal Council Chairpersons election
S. No.	Municipal Council	District	Winning candidate	Winning party	Runner up	Runner up party	Margin
1	Chiliyanaula	Almora	Arun Rawat	Indian National Congress	Kavindra Kunwarbi	Independent	296
2	Khatima	Udham Singh Nagar	Ramesh Joshi	Bharatiya Janata Party	Rashid Ansari	Independent	11,162
3	Sitarganj	Udham Singh Nagar	Sukhdev Singh	Bharatiya Janata Party	Sarfaraz Ahmed	Independent	3,906
4	Gadarpur	Udham Singh Nagar	Manoj Gumber	Bharatiya Janata Party	Chandra	Indian National Congress	2,579
5	Bajpur	Udham Singh Nagar	Gurjit Singh Gitte	Indian National Congress	Raj Kumar	Independent	2,651
6	Jaspur	Udham Singh Nagar	Mohammad Naushad	Independent	Ashok Kumar	Bharatiya Janata Party	3,080
7	Mahua Kheraganj	Udham Singh Nagar	Rizwan Ahmed	Independent	Abdul Hasan	Independent	2,622
8	Nagla	Udham Singh Nagar	Sachin Shukla	Bharatiya Janata Party	Vikram Mahauri	Independent	1,856
9	Tanakpur	Champawat	Vipin Verma	Bharatiya Janata Party	Heema	Indian National Congress	1,150
10	Champawat	Champawat	Prema Pandey	Bharatiya Janata Party	Mamata Verma	Independent	110
11	Lohaghat	Champawat	Govind Verma	Bharatiya Janata Party	Ranjeet Adhikari	Indian National Congress	1,441
12	Bhowali	Nainital	Pankaj Arya	Indian National Congress	Prakash Chandra Arya	Bharatiya Janata Party	3
13	Nainital	Nainital	Saraswati Khetwal	Indian National Congress	Jeevanti Bhatt	Bharatiya Janata Party	3,919
14	Ramnagar	Nainital	Akram Khan	Independent	Madan Mohan Joshi	Bharatiya Janata Party	1,129
15	Bhimtal	Nainital	Seema Tamta	Indian National Congress	Kamla Arya	Bharatiya Janata Party	56
16	Kaladhungi	Nainital	Rekha Katyura	Independent	Bhawana Sati	Indian National Congress	411
17	Gangolihat	Pithoragarh	Vimal Rawal	Bharatiya Janata Party	Narayan Singh Bohra	Indian National Congress	271
18	Dharchula	Pithoragarh	Shashish Thapa	Indian National Congress	Bela Sharma	Bharatiya Janata Party	248
19	Didihat	Pithoragarh	Girish Chuphal	Indian National Congress	Lalit Mohan Kaphaliya	Independent	124
20	Berinag	Pithoragarh	Hemwanti Pant	Indian National Congress	Rajni Rawat	Independent	73
21	Bageshwar	Bageshwar	Suresh Khetwal	Bharatiya Janata Party	Kavi Joshi	Independent	1,043
22	Uttarkashi	Uttarkashi	Bhupendra Chauhan	Independent	Kishore Bhatt	Bharatiya Janata Party	3,322
23	Chinyalisaur	Uttarkashi	Manoj Kohli	Independent	Jeet Lal	Bharatiya Janata Party	493
24	Barkot	Uttarkashi	Vinod Dobhal	Independent	Atol Singh Rawat	Bharatiya Janata Party	1,933
25	Purola	Uttarkashi	Bihari Lal Shah	Indian National Congress	Pyare Lal Himani	Bharatiya Janata Party	698
26	Gopeshwar	Chamoli	Sandeep Rawat	Bharatiya Janata Party	Pramod Bisht	Indian National Congress	527
27	Joshimath	Chamoli	Deveshwari Shah	Indian National Congress	Sushma Dimri	Bharatiya Janata Party	446
28	Karnaprayag	Chamoli	Ganesh Chandra Shah	Bharatiya Janata Party	Ram Dayal	Indian National Congress	87
29	Gauchar	Chamoli	Sandeep Singh	Indian National Congress	Sunil Panwar	Independent	187
30	Tehri	Tehri Garhwal	Mohan Singh Rawat	Independent	Kuldeep Singh Panwar	Indian National Congress	3,452
31	Muni Ki Reti	Tehri Garhwal	Neelam Vijlwan	Independent	Beena Joshi	Bharatiya Janata Party	6,051
32	Chamba	Tehri Garhwal	Shobhni Dhanola	Bharatiya Janata Party	Beena Devi	Indian National Congress	1,234
33	Devprayag	Tehri Garhwal	Mamta Devi	Bharatiya Janata Party	Won uncontested		
34	Vikasnagar	Dehradun	Dheeraj Nautiyal	Indian National Congress	Pooja Chauhan Garg	Bharatiya Janata Party	569
35	Doiwala	Dehradun	Narendra Singh Negi	Bharatiya Janata Party	Sagar Manwal	Indian National Congress	2,634
36	Herbertpur	Dehradun	Neeru Devi	Bharatiya Janata Party	Saraswati Panyuli	Independent	3,881
37	Mussoorie	Dehradun	Meera Saklani	Bharatiya Janata Party	Upma Panwar Gupta	Independent	312
38	Pauri	Pauri Garhwal	Himani Negi	Independent	Yashoda Negi	Indian National Congress	228
39	Dugadda	Pauri Garhwal	Shanti Bisht	Independent	Bhavna Chauhan	Independent	75
40	Rudraprayag	Rudraprayag	Santosh Rawat	Independent	Chandra Mohan Semwal	Bharatiya Janata Party	369
41	Manglaur	Haridwar	Mohiuddin	Independent	Kainsar	Independent	1,610
42	Laksar	Haridwar	Sanjeev Chaudhary	Bahujan Samaj Party	Jagdev Singh	Indian National Congress	164
43	Shivalik Nagar	Haridwar	Rajiv Sharma	Bharatiya Janata Party	Mahesh Pratap Rana	Indian National Congress	2,318

=== Nagar Panchayat Chairpersons ===
Nagar Panchayat Chairpersons election
S. No.	Nagar Panchayat	District	Winning candidate	Winning party	Runner up	Runner up party	Margin
1	Dwarahat	Almora	Sangeeta Arya	Indian National Congress	Lakshmi Arya	Bharatiya Janata Party	342
2	Chaukhutia	Almora	Revti Devi	Bharatiya Janata Party	Pooja Goswami	Indian National Congress	873
3	Bhikiyasain	Almora	Ganga Bisht	Indian National Congress	Leela Bisht	Bharatiya Janata Party	448
4	Dineshpur	Udham Singh Nagar	Manjeet Kaur	Bharatiya Janata Party	Won uncontested		
5	Shaktigarh	Udham Singh Nagar	Sumit Mondal (Note: Elected as an independent, joined BJP in 2026.)	Independent	Vishwajit Haldar	Bharatiya Janata Party	395
6	Kelakhera	Udham Singh Nagar	Mohammad Safi	Independent	Babli	Indian National Congress	42
7	Lalpur	Udham Singh Nagar	Balwinder Kaur	Bharatiya Janata Party	Shahana Bano	Independent	1,386
8	Mahua Dabra Haripura	Udham Singh Nagar	Gayatri Devi	Independent	Bahadur Lal	Independent	649
9	Sultanpur	Udham Singh Nagar	Rajeev Kumar	Bharatiya Janata Party	Sajid Hussain	Independent	1,044
10	Nanakmatta	Udham Singh Nagar	Prem Singh	Bharatiya Janata Party	Won uncontested		
11	Gularbhoj	Udham Singh Nagar	Satish Chugh (Note: Elected as independent, joined BJP in 2026)	Independent	Sanjeev Kumar	Bharatiya Janata Party	1,290
12	Banbasa	Champawat	Rekha Devi	Bharatiya Janata Party	Vijendra Kumar	Indian National Congress	75
13	Selakui	Dehradun	Sumit Chaudhary	Independent	Bhagat Singh Rathore	Bharatiya Janata Party	2,281
14	Lalkuan	Nainital	Surendra Lotni	Independent	Asmita Mishra	Indian National Congress	197
15	Munsiyari	Pithoragarh	Rajendra Singh Pangati	Independent	Manohar Singh Toliya	Indian National Congress	527
16	Kapkot	Bageshwar	Geeta Aithani	Bharatiya Janata Party	Dhana Bisht	Indian National Congress	107
17	Garur	Bageshwar	Bhawna Verma	Indian National Congress	Lalita Verma	Bharatiya Janata Party	37
18	Naugaon	Uttarkashi	Vijay Kumar	Bharatiya Janata Party	Vipin Kumar	Indian National Congress	223
19	Nandaprayag	Chamoli	Prithvi Rautela	Indian National Congress	Pankaj Sajwan	Independent politician	30
20	Gairsain	Chamoli	Mohan Bhandari	Indian National Congress	Mamata Negi	Bharatiya Janata Party	460
21	Pokhari	Chamoli	Sohan Lal	Independent	Rajendra	Independent	7
22	Pipalkoti	Chamoli	Arti Nawani	Independent	Jyoti Devi Hatwal	Independent	194
23	Tharali	Chamoli	Sunita Rawat	Indian National Congress	Suman Devi	Bharatiya Janata Party	544
24	Nandanagar	Chamoli	Beena Devi	Indian National Congress	Sandhya Devrari	Bharatiya Janata Party	183
25	Kirtinagar	Tehri Garhwal	Rakesh Mohan Maithani	Bharatiya Janata Party	Ramlal Nautiyal	Indian National Congress	795
26	Gaja	Tehri Garhwal	Kunwar Singh Chauhan	Independent	Rajendra Singh Khati	Bharatiya Janata Party	156
27	Ghansali	Tehri Garhwal	Anand Bisht	Bharatiya Janata Party	Shankar Pal	Indian National Congress	222
28	Chamiyala	Tehri Garhwal	Govind Singh Rana	Bharatiya Janata Party	Tajvir Singh	Independent	290
29	Lambgaon	Tehri Garhwal	Roshan Rangad	Bharatiya Janata Party	Anujwant Singh	Independent	407
30	Tapovan	Tehri Garhwal	Vineeta Bisht	Bharatiya Janata Party	Roshni Bisht	Independent	266
31	Swarg Ashram	Pauri Garhwal	Bindiya Agrawal	Indian National Congress	Himani Rana	Bharatiya Janata Party	580
32	Thalisain	Pauri Garhwal	Beera Devi	Indian National Congress	Vineeta Devi	Bharatiya Janata Party	27
33	Satpuli	Pauri Garhwal	Jitendra Chauhan	Indian National Congress	Anjana Verma	Bharatiya Janata Party	471
34	Agastmuni	Rudraprayag	Rajendra Prasad	Indian National Congress	Satish Prasad	Bharatiya Janata Party	18
35	Tilwara	Rudraprayag	Vineeta Devi	Bharatiya Janata Party	Seema Devi	Indian National Congress	62
36	Ukhimath	Rudraprayag	Kubja Dharmvan	Independent	Kalpeshwari Devi	Independent	91
37	Guptkashi	Rudraprayag	Vishweshwari Devi	Bharatiya Janata Party	Smriti Lata	Independent	35
38	Jhabrera	Haridwar	Kiran Chaudhary	Indian National Congress	Manvendra Singh	Bharatiya Janata Party	860
39	Piran Kaliyar	Haridwar	Sameena	Bahujan Samaj Party	Munasreena	Independent	1,128
40	Bhagwanpur	Haridwar	Gul Bahar	Indian National Congress	Rachit Agarwal	Bharatiya Janata Party	2,250
41	Landhaura	Haridwar	Mohammad Naseem	Independent	Khaleel Ahmed	Independent	1,710
42	Dhandera	Haridwar	Satish Singh Negi	Independent	Ravi Rana	Bharatiya Janata Party	152
43	Imlikhera	Haridwar	Manoj Kumar	Independent	Shamsher Ali	Indian National Congress	1,117
44	Rampur	Haridwar	Mohammad Parvez	Independent	Mohammad Imran	Independent	1,264
45	Sultanpur Adampur	Haridwar	Rubia Anjum	Indian National Congress	Sultan Ahmed	Bahujan Samaj Party	1,086
46	Padali Gujjar	Haridwar	Shahrun	Indian National Congress	Sunita Singh	Independent	1,824

== Analysis of result ==
The BJP won 10 municipal corporations, 17 municipal councils and 15 notified area councils. Independents won 1 municipal corporation, bagged 13 municipal councils and won 15 notified area councils. Congress drew a blank in municipal coroprations but managed to win 12 municipal councils and 15 notified area councils. BSP won 2 municipal councils. BJP won 259 wards in municipal corporation whereas Independent won 193. Congress won 86. BSP and UKD won 1 each. BJP won 129 wards in municipal councils while Independents bagged 269. Congress won 46. BJP won 67 wards in notified area councils while Independents won 190. Congress won 37 and AAP won 2 seats. BSP bagged 1.

== See also ==
- 2025 Dehradun Municipal Corporation election
- 2025 Roorkee Municipal Corporation election
- 2025 Haridwar Municipal Corporation election
- 2025 Haldwani Municipal Corporation election
- 2025 Rudrapur Municipal Corporation election
- 2025 Kotdwar Municipal Corporation election
- 2025 Rishikesh Municipal Corporation election
- 2025 Almora Municipal Corporation election
- 2025 Kashipur Municipal Corporation election
- 2025 Pithoragarh Municipal Corporation election
- 2025 Srinagar Municipal Corporation election
- 2025 elections in India
- July 2025 Uttarakhand local elections
- 2026 Uttarakhand local elections
