= 2018 Uttarakhand local elections =

Uttarakhand Elections

2018 Uttarakhand municipal general elections
- 18 November 2018

1148 seats of the urban local bodies in Uttarakhand
- Turnout: 69.79% (▲8.79 pp)

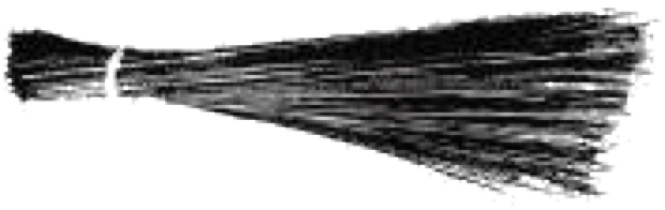

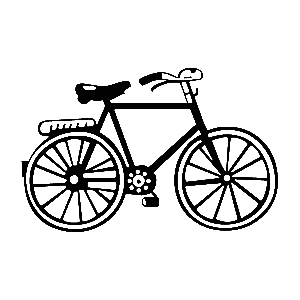

| | First party | Second party | Third party |
|---|---|---|---|
| Leader | Ajay Bhatt | Pritam Singh |
| Party | BJP | INC | BSP |
| Leader since | 2016 | 2017 |
| Last election | 202 | 155 | 7 |
| Seats won | 357 | 207 | 5 |
| Seat change | ▲155 | ▲52 | ▼2 |
| | Fourth party | Fifth party | Sixth party |
| Leader | | | Kashi Singh Airy |
| Party | AAP | SP | UKD |
| Leader since | | | 2017 |
| Last election | new | 2 | 2 |
| Seats won | 2 | 1 | 1 |
| Seat change | ▲2 | ▼1 | ▼1 |
| | Seventh party |
| Leader | none |
| Party | Independent |
| Last election | 391 |
| Seats won | 575 |
| Seat change | ▲184 |

The 2018 Uttarakhand Municipal general elections were held in the Indian state of Uttarakhand on 18 November 2018.

The Uttarakhand State Election Commission announced the poll dates on 15 October 2018. The results were declared on 20 November 2018.

The elections for the Roorkee Municipal Corporation, municipal councils of Bajpur and Srinagar and the nagar panchayats of Chaukhutia and Selakui were postponed.

Elections are not held in the nagar panchayats of Badrinath, Kedarnath and Gangotri due to their status of temporary settlements. Local interim administration councils administer these three pilgrimage sites for a period of six months during the summers.

| Event | Date | Day |
| Date for Nominations | 20 Oct 2018 | Saturday |
| Last Date for filing Nominations | 23 Oct 2018 | Tuesday |
| Date for scrutiny of nominations | 25 Oct 2018; 26 Oct 2018 | Thursday; Friday |
| Last date for withdrawal of candidatures | 27 Oct 2018 | Saturday |
| Allotment of Symbols | 29 Oct 2018 | Monday |
| Date of poll | 18 Nov 2018 | Sunday |
| Date of counting | 20 Nov 2018 | Tuesday |

== Results ==
=== Municipal Corporation Mayoral results ===
Municipal Corporation Mayoral results
| S. No. | Municipal Corporation | District | Winner | Party | Runner-up | Party | Margin |
|---|---|---|---|---|---|---|---|
| 1 | Rudrapur Municipal Corporation | Udham Singh Nagar | Rampal Singh | Bharatiya Janata Party | Nand Lal | Indian National Congress | 5,134 |
| 2 | Kashipur Municipal Corporation | Udham Singh Nagar | Usha Chaudhary | Bharatiya Janata Party | Mukta Singh | Indian National Congress | 5,472 |
| 3 | Haldwani Municipal Corporation | Nainital | Jogendra Pal Singh Rautela | Bharatiya Janata Party | Sumit Hridayesh | Indian National Congress | 10,854 |
| 4 | Dehradun Municipal Corporation | Dehradun | Sunil Uniyal 'Gama' | Bharatiya Janata Party | Dinesh Agrawal | Indian National Congress | 35,632 |
| 5 | Rishikesh Municipal Corporation | Dehradun | Anita Mamgain | Bharatiya Janata Party | Veena Deep Sharma | Independent | 11,168 |
| 6 | Kotdwar Municipal Corporation | Pauri Garhwal | Hemlata Negi | Indian National Congress | Vibha Chauhan | Independent | 1,568 |
| 7 | Haridwar Municipal Corporation | Haridwar | Anita Sharma | Indian National Congress | Annu Kakkar | Bharatiya Janata Party | 3,467 |

=== Municipal Council Chairpersons results ===
Municipal Council Chairpersons results
| S. No. | Municipal Council | District | Winner | Party | Runner-up | Party | Margin |
|---|---|---|---|---|---|---|---|
| 1 | Almora | Almora | Prakash Chandra Joshi | Indian National Congress | Kailash Chandra Gururani | Bharatiya Janata Party | 1,004 |
| 2 | Chiliyanaula | Almora | Kalpana Devi | Independent | Nirmala Arya | Bharatiya Janata Party | 109 |
| 3 | Khatima | Udham Singh Nagar | Soni Rana | Indian National Congress | Meena Devi | Bharatiya Janata Party | 10,909 |
| 4 | Sitarganj | Udham Singh Nagar | Harish Dubey | Independent | Anwar Ahmad | Indian National Congress | 1,492 |
| 5 | Gadarpur | Udham Singh Nagar | Ghulam Ghaus | Independent | Santosh Kumar | Bharatiya Janata Party | 1,661 |
| 6 | Kichha | Udham Singh Nagar | Darshan Kumar Koli | Indian National Congress | Rekha Gupta | Bharatiya Janata Party | 12,679 |
| 7 | Jaspur | Udham Singh Nagar | Mumtaz Begum | Bahujan Samaj Party | Damyanti Devi | Bharatiya Janata Party | 1,999 |
| 8 | Mahua Kheraganj | Udham Singh Nagar | Nasima Begum | Indian National Congress | Mehtab Jahan | Independent | 499 |
| 9 | Tanakpur | Champawat | Vipin Kumar | Independent | Dipak Chandra Pathak | Bharatiya Janata Party | 777 |
| 10 | Champawat | Champawat | Vijay Verma | Indian National Congress | Prakash Chandra Pandey | Independent | 393 |
| 11 | Bhowali | Nainital | Sanjay Verma | Bharatiya Janata Party | Pushpesh Pandey | Indian National Congress | 243 |
| 12 | Nainital | Nainital | Sachin Negi | Indian National Congress | Kishna Singh Negi | Independent | 214 |
| 13 | Ramnagar | Nainital | Akram Khan | Indian National Congress | Ruchi | Bharatiya Janata Party | 5,361 |
| 14 | Pithoragarh | Pithoragarh | Rajendra Singh | Bharatiya Janata Party | Shamsher Singh Mahar | Independent | 1,017 |
| 15 | Dharchula | Pithoragarh | Rajeshwari Devi | Bharatiya Janata Party | Lakshmi Gunjyal | Indian National Congress | 303 |
| 16 | Didihat | Pithoragarh | Kamla Chuphal | Bharatiya Janata Party | Dhana Devi | Independent | 84 |
| 17 | Bageshwar | Bageshwar | Suresh Khetwal | Independent | Kundan Singh | Bharatiya Janata Party | 367 |
| 18 | Uttarkashi | Uttarkashi | Ram Prasad Semwal | Indian National Congress | Bhupendra Singh | Independent | 889 |
| 19 | Chinyalisaur | Uttarkashi | Beena Devi | Independent | Jayani Devi Bisht | Bharatiya Janata Party | 1,464 |
| 20 | Barkot | Uttarkashi | Anupama Devi | Indian National Congress | Krishna Devi | Independent | 904 |
| 21 | Gopeshwar | Chamoli | Sundar Lal | Indian National Congress | Pushpa Paswan | Bharatiya Janata Party | 545 |
| 22 | Joshimath | Chamoli | Shailendra Panwar | Indian National Congress | Subhash Dimri | Independent | 533 |
| 23 | Karnaprayag | Chamoli | Damyanti Raturi | Bharatiya Janata Party | Rajni Chauhan | Independent | 258 |
| 24 | Gauchar | Chamoli | Anju Bisht | Bharatiya Janata Party | Indu Panwar | Indian National Congress | 31 |
| 25 | Narendranagar | Tehri Garhwal | Rajendra Vikram Singh Panwar | Bharatiya Janata Party | Rajendra Singh | Independent | 204 |
| 26 | Tehri | Tehri Garhwal | Seema Krishali | Independent | Sushma Uniyal | Independent | 644 |
| 27 | Muni Ki Reti | Tehri Garhwal | Roshan Raturi | Bharatiya Janata Party | Yogesh Rana | Independent | 252 |
| 28 | Chamba | Tehri Garhwal | Suman Ramola | Indian National Congress | Nirmala Devi | Independent | 77 |
| 29 | Devprayag | Tehri Garhwal | Krishna Kant Kotiyal | Independent | Rajesh | Independent | 23 |
| 30 | Vikasnagar | Dehradun | Shanti Juwantha | Bharatiya Janata Party | Devanand | Indian National Congress | 1,805 |
| 31 | Doiwala | Dehradun | Sumitra Devi | Indian National Congress | Nagina Rani | Bharatiya Janata Party | 196 |
| 32 | Herbertpur | Dehradun | Devendra Singh Bisht | Indian National Congress | Niru Devi | Bharatiya Janata Party | 128 |
| 33 | Mussoorie | Dehradun | Anuj Gupta | Independent | Om Prakash Uniyal | Bharatiya Janata Party | 166 |
| 34 | Pauri | Pauri Garhwal | Yashpal Benam | Bharatiya Janata Party | Sarita Negi | Indian National Congress | 2,282 |
| 35 | Dugadda | Pauri Garhwal | Bhavna Chauhan | Independent | Usha Juyal | Bharatiya Janata Party | 408 |
| 36 | Rudraprayag | Rudraprayag | Gita Devi | Indian National Congress | Saraswati Trivedi | Bharatiya Janata Party | 563 |
| 37 | Manglaur | Haridwar | Dilshad | Independent | Islam | Indian National Congress | 599 |
| 38 | Laksar | Haridwar | Ambrish Garg | Bharatiya Janata Party | Arun Kumar | Bahujan Samaj Party | 1,058 |
| 39 | Shivalik Nagar | Haridwar | Rajiv Sharma | Bharatiya Janata Party | Upendra Kumar | Independent | 2,431 |

=== Nagar Panchayat Chairpersons results ===
Nagar Panchayat Chairpersons results
| S. No. | Town Panchayat | District | Winner | Party | Runner-up | Party | Margin |
|---|---|---|---|---|---|---|---|
| 1 | Dwarahat | Almora | Mukesh Lal | Bharatiya Janata Party | Nirmal Mathpal | Indian National Congress | 404 |
| 2 | Bhikiyasain | Almora | Ambuli Devi | Bharatiya Janata Party | Kamla Devi | Indian National Congress | 76 |
| 3 | Dineshpur | Udham Singh Nagar | Seema Sarkar | Bharatiya Janata Party | Lakshmi Rai | Indian National Congress | 1,316 |
| 4 | Shaktigarh | Udham Singh Nagar | Sukant Brahma | Bharatiya Janata Party | Ramesh Rai | Indian National Congress | 445 |
| 5 | Kela Khera | Udham Singh Nagar | Hamid Ali | Independent | Akram Khan | Samajwadi Party | 100 |
| 6 | Mahua Dabra Haripura | Udham Singh Nagar | Gayatri Devi | Independent | Afsari Begum | Independent | 0 (lottery draw) |
| 7 | Sultanpur | Udham Singh Nagar | Rajendra Kumar Sharma | Independent | Muhammad Rafi | Indian National Congress | 745 |
| 8 | Nanakmatta | Udham Singh Nagar | Prem Singh | Indian National Congress | Gurprit Singh | Bharatiya Janata Party | 12 |
| 9 | Gularbhoj | Udham Singh Nagar | Anita Dubey | Bharatiya Janata Party | Revti Devi | Indian National Congress | 4 |
| 10 | Banbasa | Champawat | Renu Agrawal | Independent | Vimla Sajwan | Bharatiya Janata Party | 362 |
| 11 | Lohaghat | Champawat | Govind Verma | Independent | Dipak Oli | Bharatiya Janata Party | 157 |
| 12 | Lalkuan | Nainital | Lal Chandra Singh | Indian National Congress | Arun Prakash | Bharatiya Janata Party | 301 |
| 13 | Bhimtal | Nainital | Devendra Singh Chanautia | Indian National Congress | Hitendra Singh Bisht | Independent | 307 |
| 14 | Kaladhungi | Nainital | Pushkar Katyura | Bharatiya Janata Party | Ali Husain | Independent | 25 |
| 15 | Gangolihat | Pithoragarh | Jayshri Pathak | Bharatiya Janata Party | Sunita Rawal | Indian National Congress | 146 |
| 16 | Berinag | Pithoragarh | Hem Chandra Pant | Independent | Mahesh Chandra Pant | Bharatiya Janata Party | 1,139 |
| 17 | Kapkot | Bageshwar | Govind Singh | Indian National Congress | Girish Joshi | Bharatiya Janata Party | 347 |
| 18 | Naugaon | Uttarkashi | Shashi Mohan | Bharatiya Janata Party | Rajesh Rawat | Indian National Congress | 796 |
| 19 | Purola | Uttarkashi | Surendra Lal | Indian National Congress | Pushpa Paswan | Bharatiya Janata Party | 173 |
| 20 | Nandaprayag | Chamoli | Himani | Bharatiya Janata Party | Kanij | Indian National Congress | 248 |
| 21 | Gairsain | Chamoli | Pushkar Singh | Indian National Congress | Janki Devi | Bharatiya Janata Party | 879 |
| 22 | Pokhari | Chamoli | Lakshmi Prasad | Independent | Jagdish Prasad | Indian National Congress | 176 |
| 23 | Pipalkoti | Chamoli | Ramesh Lal Badwal | Bharatiya Janata Party | Rajesh Banwal | Independent | 152 |
| 24 | Tharali | Chamoli | Deepa Devi | Bharatiya Janata Party | Kunti Devi | Indian National Congress | 192 |
| 25 | Kirtinagar | Tehri Garhwal | Kailashi Devi | Bharatiya Janata Party | Maheshwari Devi | Uttarakhand Kranti Dal | 68 |
| 26 | Gaja | Tehri Garhwal | Meena Khati | Bharatiya Janata Party | Usha Chauhan | Indian National Congress | 117 |
| 27 | Ghansali | Tehri Garhwal | Shankar Pal Singh Sajwan | Independent | Nagendra Singh | Independent | 1 |
| 28 | Chamiyala | Tehri Garhwal | Mamta Panwar | Indian National Congress | Dildar Singh Rana | Bharatiya Janata Party | 100 |
| 29 | Lambgaon | Tehri Garhwal | Bharosi Devi | Independent | Mamta Panwar | Bharatiya Janata Party | 122 |
| 30 | Swargashram | Pauri Garhwal | Madhav Agrawal | Indian National Congress | Manish Rajput | Bharatiya Janata Party | 844 |
| 31 | Satpuli | Pauri Garhwal | Anjana Verma | Bharatiya Janata Party | Kiran Devi | Indian National Congress | 384 |
| 32 | Agastmuni | Rudraprayag | Aruna Devi | Independent | Radha Devi | Indian National Congress | 78 |
| 33 | Tilwara | Rudraprayag | Sanju | Independent | Rekha Devi | Indian National Congress | 161 |
| 34 | Ukhimath | Rudraprayag | Vijay Singh | Bharatiya Janata Party | Prakash Singh | Independent | 261 |
| 35 | Jhabrera | Haridwar | Manvendra Singh | Bharatiya Janata Party | Gaurav | Indian National Congress | 388 |
| 36 | Piran Kaliyar | Haridwar | Sakhawat | Independent | Salim | Independent | 458 |
| 37 | Bhagwanpur | Haridwar | Sehati Devi | Bharatiya Janata Party | Satyapal Singh | Indian National Congress | 520 |
| 38 | Landhaura | Haridwar | Shahzad Khan | Independent | Shah Rana | Independent | 964 |

=== Municipal general election results ===
Municipal general election results
| Party | Mayors/Chairpersons | | Corporators/Ward Members | | Total | |
| Party | Seats | +/- | Seats | +/- | Seats | +/- |
|---|---|---|---|---|---|---|
| Bharatiya Janata Party | 34 | ▲12 | 323 | ▲143 | 357 | ▲155 |
| Indian National Congress | 25 | ▲5 | 182 | ▲47 | 207 | ▲52 |
| Bahujan Samaj Party | 1 | ▼2 | 4 | Steady | 5 | ▼2 |
| Aam Aadmi Party | 0 | Steady | 2 | ▲2 | 2 | ▲2 |
| Samajwadi Party | 0 | ▼1 | 1 | Steady | 1 | ▼1 |
| Uttarakhand Kranti Dal | 0 | ▼1 | 1 | Steady | 1 | ▼1 |
| Independents | 24 | ▲2 | 551 | ▲182 | 575 | ▲184 |
| Total | 84 | ▲15 | 1064 | ▲374 | 1148 | ▲389 |

== See also ==
- 2018 Dehradun Municipal Corporation election
- 2018 elections in India
