= Bharatiya Janata Party – Uttarakhand =

Uttarakhand affiliate of the Bharatiya Janata Party

Bharatiya Janata Party – Uttarakhand भारतीय जनता पार्टी – उत्तराखंड
- President: Mahendra Bhatt
- Chairman: Pushkar Singh Dhami (Chief Minister)
- General Secretary: Phanindranath Sharma
- Founder: Atal Bihari Vajpayee; Lal Krishna Advani; Murli Manohar Joshi; Nanaji Deshmukh; K. R. Malkani; Sikandar Bakht; Vijay Kumar Malhotra; Vijaya Raje Scindia; Bhairon Singh Shekhawat; Shanta Kumar; Ram Jethmalani; Jagannathrao Joshi
- Founded: 6 April 1980 (46 years ago)
- Headquarters: 39/29/3 Balbir Road, Dehradun-248201, Uttarakhand
- Youth wing: Bharatiya Janata Yuva Morcha, Uttarakhand
- Women's wing: BJP Mahila Morcha, Uttarakhand
- Ideology: Integral humanism; Social conservatism; Economic liberalism; Cultural nationalism; Hindu nationalism
- Colours: Saffron
- Alliance: National Democratic Alliance
- Seats in Rajya Sabha: 3 / 3
- Seats in Lok Sabha: 5 / 5
- Seats in Uttarakhand Legislative Assembly: 47 / 70

Election symbol
- Lotus

Party flag

Website
- uttarakhand.bjp.org

Bharatiya Janata Party – Uttarakhand or BJP Uttarakhand is a state unit of the Bharatiya Janata Party (BJP) in Uttarakhand.

Mahendra Bhatt is the current president of the BJP Uttarakhand.

== Electoral history ==
=== Lok Sabha election ===
Year	Seats won	+/-	Outcome
2004	3 / 5	Steady	Opposition
2009	0 / 5	▼3	Opposition
2014	5 / 5	▲5	Government
2019	5 / 5	Steady	Government
2024	5 / 5	Steady	Government

=== Vidhan Sabha election ===
Year	Seats won	+/-	Voteshare (%)	+/- (%)	Outcome
2002	19 / 70	Steady	25.81%	Steady	Opposition
2007	35 / 70	▲16	31.90%	▲6.09%	Government
2012	31 / 70	▼4	33.13%	▲1.23%	Opposition
2017	57 / 70	▲26	46.5%	▲13.37%	Government
2022	47 / 70	▼10	44.3%	▼2.2%	Government

=== Local elections ===
BJP performs strongly in urban areas. 10 of the 11 municipal corporations are currently under its control.

==== Municipal Corporation ====
Year	Municipal Corporation	Seats Won	Change in Seats	Status (in legislature)	Mayoral election result
Dehradun district
2008	Dehradun Municipal Corporation	28 / 60	New entry	Government	Won
2013	Dehradun Municipal Corporation	34 / 60	▲6	Majority Government	Won
2013	Dehradun Municipal Corporation	60 / 100	▲26	Majority Government	Won
2025	Dehradun Municipal Corporation	63 / 100	▲3	Majority Government	Won
2018	Rishikesh Municipal Corporation	15 / 40	New entry	Government	Won
2025	Rishikesh Municipal Corporation	18 / 40	▲3	Government	Won
Haridwar district
2013	Haridwar Municipal Corporation	19 / 30	New entry	Majority Government	Won
2018	Haridwar Municipal Corporation	33 / 60	▲14	Majority (Note: Despite the party winning majority of the seats, the BJP mayoral candidate lost)	Lost
2025	Haridwar Municipal Corporation	40 / 60	▲7	Majority Government	Won
2013	Roorkee Municipal Corporation	5 / 20	New entry	Official Opposition	Lost
2019	Roorkee Municipal Corporation	17 / 40	▲12	Coalition government	Lost
2025	Roorkee Municipal Corporation	24 / 40	▲7	Majority Government	Won
Udham Singh Nagar
2013	Rudrapur Municipal Corporation	6 / 20	New entry	Government	Won
2018	Rudrapur Municipal Corporation	17 / 40	▲11	Government	Won
2025	Rudrapur Municipal Corporation	21 / 40	▲4	Majority Government	Won
2013	Kashipur Municipal Corporation	7 / 20	New entry	Coalition government	Lost
2018	Kashipur Municipal Corporation	15 / 40	▲8	Government	Won
2025	Kashipur Municipal Corporation	19 / 40	▲4	Government	Won
Nainital
2013	Haldwani Municipal Corporation	9 / 20	New entry	Government	Won
2018	Haldwani Municipal Corporation	31 / 60	▲22	Majority Government	Won
2025	Haldwani Municipal Corporation	23 / 60	▼8	Government	Won
Pauri Garhwal
2018	Kotdwar Municipal Corporation	12 / 40	New entry	Official Opposition	Lost
2025	Kotdwar Municipal Corporation	18 / 40	▲6	Government	Won
2025	Srinagar Municipal Corporation	16 / 40	New entry	Official Opposition	Lost
Almora
2025	Almora Municipal Corporation	15 / 40	New entry	Government	Won
Pithoragarh
2025	Pithoragarh Municipal Corporation	5 / 40	New entry	Minority Government	Won

== Leadership ==
=== Chief Ministers ===
#	Portrait	Name	Constituency	Term of Office			Assembly
1		Nityanand Swami	MLC	9 November 2000	30 October 2001	355 days	Interim
2		Bhagat Singh Koshyari	MLC	30 October 2001	2 March 2002	123 days	Interim
3		Bhuwan Chandra Khanduri	Dhumakot	7 March 2007	27 June 2009	2 years, 296 days	2nd
3		Bhuwan Chandra Khanduri	Dhumakot	11 September 2011	13 March 2012	2 years, 296 days	2nd
4		Ramesh Pokhriyal	Thalisain	27 June 2009	11 September 2011	2 years, 76 days	2nd
5		Trivendra Singh Rawat	Doiwala	18 March 2017	10 March 2021	3 years, 357 days	4th
6		Tirath Singh Rawat	Did not contest	10 March 2021	4 July 2021	116 days	4th
7		Pushkar Singh Dhami	Khatima	4 July 2021	23 March 2022	5 years, 132 days	4th
7		Pushkar Singh Dhami	Champawat	23 March 2022	Incumbent	5 years, 132 days	5th

=== Leaders of the Opposition ===
No	Portrait	Name	Constituency	Term of office			Assembly	Chief Minister
1		Bhagat Singh Koshyari	Kapkot	13 March 2002	17 December 2003	1 year, 279 days	1st	Narayan Datt Tiwari
2		Matbar Singh Kandari	Rudraprayag	17 December 2003	2 March 2007	3 years, 75 days	1st	Narayan Datt Tiwari
3		Ajay Bhatt	Ranikhet	19 May 2012	14 March 2017	4 years, 299 days	3rd	Vijay Bahuguna; Harish Rawat

=== Presidents ===
#	Portrait	Name	Term of Office	
1		Puran Chandra Sharma	9 November 2000	14 September 2002
2		Manohar Kant Dhyani	15 September 2002	2004
3		Bhagat Singh Koshyari	2004	2007
4		Bachi Singh Rawat	2007	12 July 2009
5		Bishan Singh Chuphal	13 July 2009	8 February 2013
6		Tirath Singh Rawat	9 February 2013	31 December 2015
7		Ajay Bhatt	1 January 2016	15 January 2020
8		Banshidhar Bhagat	16 January 2020	12 March 2021
9		Madan Kaushik	12 March 2021	30 July 2022
10		Mahendra Bhatt	30 July 2022	Incumbent

== See also ==
- Bharatiya Janata Party
- Organisation of the Bharatiya Janata Party
- National Executive of the Bharatiya Janata Party
- State units of the Bharatiya Janata Party
- Uttarakhand Pradesh Congress Committee
- Uttarakhand Kranti Dal
