= 2019 Roorkee Municipal Corporation election =

Municipal election in Uttarakhand, India

← 2013	22 November 2019	2025 →

All 40 seats in the Roorkee Municipal Corporation 21 seats needed for a majority

	Majority party	Minority party	Third party
Leader	Mayank Gupta	Rishu Singh Rana	Rajendra Singh
Party	BJP	INC	BSP
Last election	5	5	0
Seats won	17	2	1
Seat change	▲12	▼3	▲1
	Fourth party
Leader	none
Party	Independent
Last election	10
Seats won	20
Seat change	▲10
Mayor before election
Yashpal Rana
Independent
Elected mayor
Gaurav Goyal
Independent

The 2019 Roorkee Municipal Corporation election was a municipal election to the Roorkee Municipal Corporation, which governs Roorkee in Uttarakhand. It took place on 22 November 2019.

== Election schedule ==
The Uttarakhand State Election Commission announced the poll dates on 22 October 2019, that the election will be held on 22 November and that the result was declared on 24 November.

Event	Date	Day
Date for Nominations	1 November 2019	Friday
Last Date for filing Nominations	2 November 2019	Saturday
Date for scrutiny of nominations	4 November 2019; 5 November 2019	Monday; Tuesday
Last date for withdrawal of candidatures	6 November 2019	Wednesday
Allotment of Symbols	7 November 2019	Thursday
Date of poll	22 November 2019	Friday
Date of counting	24 November 2019	Sunday

== Mayoral election ==
2019 Roorkee Municipal Corporation election: Mayor
Party	Candidate	Votes	%	±%
Independent	Gaurav Goyal	29,080	33.73	
INC	Rishu Singh Rana	25,629	29.73	
BJP	Mayank Gupta	19,142	22.20	
Independent	Subhash Saini	4,650	5.39	
BSP	Rajendra Kumar	4,575	5.31	
Independent	Chandra Prakash (Bata)	1,020	1.18	
Independent	Swati Kalra	640	0.70	
AAP	Abdus Salam	435	0.48	
Independent	Dipak Kumar	399	0.44	
Independent	Adesh Tyagi	290	0.32	
NOTA	None of the above	370	0.41	
Spoiled ballots	Invalid	4,616	5.08	
Majority		3,451	4.00	
Turnout		90,833		
Independent hold		Swing		

== Position of the house ==
Roorkee Municipal Corporation
Party	Won	+/−
Bharatiya Janata Party (BJP)	17	▲12
Indian National Congress (INC)	2	▼3
Bahujan Samaj Party (BSP)	1	▲1
Independents	20	▲10
Total	40	▲20

== See also ==
- 2019 Uttarakhand local elections
- 2025 Uttarakhand local elections
- 2018 Uttarakhand local elections
- 2025 Roorkee Municipal Corporation election
