= Uttarakhand State Election Commission =

Indian state election authority

Agency overview
- Formed: 30 July 2001
- Jurisdiction: Uttarakhand
- Headquarters: Dehradun, Uttarakhand
- Agency executive: Sushil Kumar, Chief Election Commissioner
- Website: sec.uk.gov.in

The Uttarakhand State Election Commission is an autonomous, independent, constitutional and statutory authority of the Indian state of Uttarakhand. It was formed on 30 July 2001 under the Constitution of India through the provisions of the 73rd and 74th Amendments Act of 1992.

== List of State Election Commissioners ==
The following have held the post of the State Election Commissioner of Uttarakhand.

| S. No. | Name | Term of office | | |
|---|---|---|---|---|
| 1. | Durgesh Joshi; IAS (Retd.) | 30 June 2001 | 16 January 2005 | 3 years, 200 days |
| 2. | R. K. Verma; IAS (Retd.) | 16 January 2005 | 3 April 2008 | 3 years, 78 days |
| 3. | Vipin Chandra Chandola; IAS (Retd.) | 4 April 2008 | 17 September 2010 | 2 years, 166 days |
| 4. | Harish Chandra Joshi; IAS (Retd.) | 18 September 2010 | 15 August 2013 | 2 years, 331 days |
| 5. | Subardhan; IAS (Retd.) | 4 September 2013 | 18 June 2018 | 4 years, 287 days |
| 6. | Chandrashekhar Bhatt; IAS (Retd.) | 11 July 2018 | 10 July 2024 | 5 years, 365 days |
| 7. | Sushil Kumar; IAS (Retd.) | 29 August 2024 | Till date | 1 year, 345 days |

== Elections ==
As of 2025 the thirteen districts in Uttarakhand had conducted eight general elections.

| Year | Election Details | |
|---|---|---|
| 2003 | First general elections | Municipal general elections: January–February in all 13 districts |
| 2003 | First general elections | Panchayat general elections: February–April in 12 districts |
| 2005 | First elections | Panchayat elections: September–October in Haridwar district |
| 2008 | Second general elections | Municipal general elections: March–April 2008 in all 13 districts |
| 2008 | Second general elections | Panchayat general elections: July–September in 12 districts |
| 2010 | Second elections | Panchayat elections: December in Haridwar district |
| 2013 | Third general elections | Municipal general elections: April in all 13 districts |
| 2014 | Fourth general elections | Panchayat general elections: June in 12 districts |
| 2015 | Third elections | Panchayat elections: December–January in Haridwar district |
| 2018 | Fifth general elections | Municipal general elections: November in all 13 districts |
| 2019 | Sixth general elections | Panchayat general elections: November in 12 districts |
| 2019 | Sixth general elections | Municipal elections: July in Bajpur and Srinagar, November in Roorkee |
| 2022 | Fourth elections | Panchayat elections: They were held in September in Haridwar district |
| 2025 | Seventh general elections | Municipal general elections: They were held in all 13 districts barring a few municipalities |
| 2025 | Eighth general elections | Panchayat general elections: They were held in July in 12 districts |
| 2026 | Ninth general elections | Municipal general elections: Held in Narendranagar, Garhinegi and Pati. |

== Municipalities ==
- Municipal Corporations
- Municipal Councils
- Nagar Panchayats

== Panchayats ==
- District Councils (Zila Panchayats)
- Block Development Councils (Block Panchayats)
- Gram Panchayats

== See also ==
- Election Commission of India
- Local government in India
- Elections in Uttarakhand
- Local elections in Uttarakhand
