= 2019 Uttarakhand local elections =

Indian state elections

2019 Uttarakhand panchayat general elections
- 5, 11 and 16 October 2019
- Turnout: 69.59%
	First party
Leader	none
Party	Independent
Last election	11100
Seats won	10825
Seat change	▼275

2019 Uttarakhand municipal elections
- 8 July and 22 November 2019

	First party	Second party	Third party
Leader	Ajay Bhatt	Pritam Singh
Party	BJP	INC	BSP
Leader since	2016	2017
Last election	10	15	0
Seats won	24	8	1
Seat change	▲14	▼7	▲1
	Fourth party
Leader	none
Party	Independent
Last election	18
Seats won	36
Seat change	▲18

The 2019 Uttarakhand Panchayat general elections were held in the Indian state of Uttarakhand on in three phases on 5, 11, and 16 October 2019.

Previously, in the same year on 14 June 2019, the Uttarakhand State Election Commission also announced the poll dates for the municipal councils of Srinagar and Bajpur on 8 July 2019 and the results were declared on 10 July 2019.

Additionally, the Uttarakhand State Election Commission announced the poll date for Roorkee Municipal Corporation on 22 November 2019 and results were declared on 24 November 2019.

== Timeline ==
Event	Date	Day
Date for Nominations	18 June 2019	Tuesday
Last Date for filing Nominations	19 June 2019	Wednesday
Date for scrutiny of nominations	20 June 2019	Thursday
Last date for withdrawal of candidatures	21 June 2019	Friday
Allotment of Symbols	22 June 2019	Saturday
Date of poll	8 July 2019	Monday
Date of counting	10 July 2019	Wednesday

== Results ==
=== Municipal Corporation Mayoral result ===
Municipal Corporation Mayoral result
S. No.	Municipal Corporation	District	Winner	Party	Runner-up	Party	Margin
1	Roorkee Municipal Corporation	Haridwar	Gaurav Goyal	Independent	Rishu Singh Rana	Indian National Congress	3,451

=== Municipal Council Chairpersons results ===
Municipal Council Chairpersons results
S. No.	Municipal Council	District	Winner	Party	Runner-up	Party	Margin
1	Bajpur	Udham Singh Nagar	Gurjit Singh Gitte	Indian National Congress	Raj Kumar	Bharatiya Janata Party	2,990
2	Srinagar	Pauri Garhwal	Punam Tiwari	Indian National Congress	Sarojini Rawat	Bharatiya Janata Party	638

=== Municipal election results ===
Municipal election results
Party	Mayors/Chairpersons		Corporators/Ward Members		Total	
Party	Seats	+/-	Seats	+/-	Seats	+/-
Bharatiya Janata Party	0	Steady	24	▲14	24	▲14
Indian National Congress	2	▲1	6	▼8	8	▼7
Bahujan Samaj Party	0	Steady	1	▲1	1	▲1
Independents	1	▼1	35	▲19	36	▲18
Total	3	Steady	66	▲26	69	▲26

=== Panchayat general election results ===
Panchayat general election results
District	Members of District Councils		Members of Block Councils		Presidents of Village Councils	
District	Seats	+/-	Seats	+/-	Seats	+/-
Almora	45	▼3	391	▼6	1160	▼8
Bageshwar	19	▼1	120	Steady	407	▼9
Chamoli	26	▼1	246	▼8	610	▼5
Champawat	15	Steady	134	Steady	313	Steady
Dehradun	30	▼13	220	▼20	401	▼59
Haridwar	No elections were held in Haridwar district					
Nainital	27	▼4	266	▼5	479	▼32
Pauri Garhwal	38	▼4	372	▼26	1174	▼38
Pithoragarh	33	Steady	290	▼1	686	▼4
Rudraprayag	18	Steady	117	▼1	336	▼3
Tehri Garhwal	45	Steady	351	▲6	1035	▼3
Udham Singh Nagar	35	▼7	273	▼7	376	▼15
Uttarkashi	25	Steady	204	▼2	508	▲4
Total	356	▼33	2984	▼70	7485	▼172

== See also ==
- 2019 Roorkee Municipal Corporation election
- 2019 elections in India
- 2025 Uttarakhand local elections
- 2026 Uttarakhand local elections
