= July 2025 Uttarakhand local elections =

Indian state elections

2025 Uttarakhand panchayat general elections
- 24 and 28 July 2025
- Turnout: 69.16%(▼0.43 pp) (Note: As compared to 2019 Uttarakhand local elections.)
	First party
Leader	none
Party	Independent
Last election	10,825
Seats won	11,082
Seat change	▲257

The 2025 Uttarakhand Panchayat general elections were held in the Indian state of Uttarakhand in two phases on 24 and 28 July 2025.The votes were counted and the results were declared on 31 July 2025.

== Timeline ==
The elections were initially scheduled in June 2025 but were suspended after an order from the Uttarakhand High Court. However, this decision was later revoked and they were held in July 2025 and the schedule for the elections was announced thereafter. The elections were held in two phases. Panchayat elections are nonpartisan in Uttarakhand, though many political parties give support to the candidates.

== Election schedule ==
Poll event	Phase	
Poll event	I	II
Notification Date	2 July	
Last Date for filing nomination	5 July	
Scrutiny of nomination	7 July	
Last Date for withdrawal of nomination	11 July	
Allotment of symbols	14 July	18 July
Date of poll	24 July	28 July
Date of counting of votes/Result	31 July	

== Results ==
=== Panchayat general election results ===
Panchayat general election results
District	Members of District Councils		Members of Block Councils		Presidents of Village Councils	
District	Seats	+/-	Seats	+/-	Seats	+/-
Almora	45	Steady	391	Steady	1160	Steady
Bageshwar	19	Steady	107	▼13	407	Steady
Chamoli	26	Steady	270	▲24	607	▼3
Champawat	15	Steady	134	Steady	313	Steady
Dehradun	30	Steady	220	Steady	401	Steady
Haridwar	No elections were held in Haridwar district (Note: Rural local body elections in Haridwar are held separately. The latest one being held in 2022.)					
Nainital	27	Steady	256	▼10	475	▼4
Pauri Garhwal	38	Steady	370	▼2	1212	▲38
Pithoragarh	32	▼1	290	Steady	690	▲4
Rudraprayag	18	Steady	115	▼2	339	▲3
Tehri Garhwal	45	Steady	351	Steady	1049	▲14
Udham Singh Nagar	35	Steady	269	▼4	309	▼67
Uttarkashi	28	▲3	201	▼3	520	▲12
Total	358	▲2	2974	▼10	7499	▲14

== By election ==
Additionally by elections to numerous vacant seats were held on 20 November 2025 and the results were declared on 22 November 2025.

== See also ==
- 2025 elections in India
- 2025 Uttarakhand local elections
- 2026 Uttarakhand local elections
