= Local elections in Uttarakhand =

Elections to the local bodies in Uttarakhand, India, are conducted once in five years to elect the representatives to the urban and rural local bodies. These elections are conducted by the Uttarakhand State Election Commission and were mandated by the 74th Constitutional Amendment Act to ensure local government in urban and rural areas.

== Urban local bodies in Uttarakhand ==
Urban local bodies include 11 Municipal Corporations, 46 Municipal Councils, 51 Nagar Panchayats and 9 Cantonment Boards.

Elections are not held in the nagar panchayats of Badrinath, Kedarnath and Gangotri due to their status of temporary settlements. Local interim administration councils administer these three pilgrimage sites for a period of six months during the summers.

Additionally, elections in the Cantonment Boards are conducted by the Ministry of Defence, Union Government of India.

== Rural local bodies in Uttarakhand ==
Rural local bodies include 13 District Councils, 95 Block Development Councils and 7793 Gram Panchayats.

== Previous elections ==
The first general election to the local bodies after statehood in Uttarakhand were held in 2003. Subsequent elections were conducted in 2008, 2013, 2014, 2018, 2019 , 2025 and 2026.

=== 2025-26 Urban local body elections ===
2025-26 Uttarakhand Municipal general election results
Party	Mayors/Chairpersons	Corporators/Ward Members	Total
Bharatiya Janata Party	43	461	504
Indian National Congress	27	171	198
Bahujan Samaj Party	2	2	4
Aam Aadmi Party	0	2	2
Uttarakhand Kranti Dal	0	1	1
Independents	31	662	693
Total	103	1302	1405

=== 2025 Rural local body elections ===
2025 Uttarakhand Panchayat general election results
District	Members of District Councils	Members of Block Councils	Presidents of Village Councils
Almora	45	391	1160
Bageshwar	19	107	407
Chamoli	26	270	607
Champawat	15	134	313
Dehradun	30	220	401
Haridwar	No elections were held in Haridwar district. (Note: Rural local body elections in Haridwar are held separately. The latest one being held in 2022.)		
Nainital	27	256	475
Pauri Garhwal	38	370	1212
Pithoragarh	32	290	690
Rudraprayag	18	115	339
Tehri Garhwal	45	351	1049
Udham Singh Nagar	35	269	309
Uttarkashi	28	201	520
Total	358	2974	7499

== See also ==
- Local government in India
- Elections in Uttarakhand
