= Didihat Municipality =

Civic body that governs the town of Didihat in Uttarakhand, India

Didihat Municipal Council नगर पालिका परिषद दीदीहाट Nagar Palika Parishad Didihat
- Unicameral Legislature

Type
- Type: Municipal Council

Leadership
- Chairperson: Girish Chuphal, INC since 7 February 2025

Structure
- Seats: 7
- Political groups: Government (4): INC (3); IND (1); Opposition (3): BJP (3)

Elections
- Voting system: first-past-the-post
- Last election: 23 January 2025
- Next election: 2030

Meeting place
- Nagar Palika Bhavan, Didihat

Website
- Nagar Palika Didihat

Nagar Palika Parishad Didihat (also known as Didihat Municipal Council) is the urban local body responsible for the civic administration of the hill town of Didihat in the Pithoragarh district of Uttarakhand, India.

== Structure ==
This council consists of 7 wards and is headed by a chairperson who presides over a deputy chairperson and 6 other ward members representing the wards. The chairperson is elected directly through a first-past-the-post voting system and the deputy chairperson is elected by the ward members from among their numbers.

== List of Chairpersons ==
The following individuals have served as the Chairperson of the Nagar Palika Parishad Didihat since its modern administrative municipal composition:

List of Chairpersons of Didihat Municipal Council
S. No.	Name	Term			Party
1	Munni	3 May 2008	2 May 2013	4 years, 364 days	Bharatiya Janata Party
2	Kavindra Shahi	3 May 2013	3 May 2018	5 years, 0 days	Independent
Administrator		3 May 2018	2 December 2018	212 days	Government of Uttarakhand
3	Kamla Chuphal	3 December 2018	3 December 2023	5 years, 0 days	Bharatiya Janata Party
Administrator		3 December 2023	7 February 2025	1 year, 66 days	Government of Uttarakhand
4	Girish Chuphal	7 February 2025	Incumbent	1 year, 261 days	Indian National Congress

== Current members ==
Didihat Nagar Palika has a total of 7 ward members, who are directly elected after a term of 5 years. The council is led by the Chairman. The latest elections were held on 23 January 2025. The current Chairman of Didihat is Girish Chufal of the Indian National Congress.

Chairman: Girish Chufal
Ward Name	Name of Ward Member	Party	Remarks
Tehsil	Kavindra Singh Sahi	Indian National Congress	
Subhash	Sujata Devi	Indian National Congress	
Shiv Mandir	Diwan Sahi	Bharatiya Janata Party	
GIC	Naeem Baksh	Independent	
Shimla	Rajni Kanyal	Bharatiya Janata Party	
Ambedkar	Dipesh Jangpangi	Bharatiya Janata Party	
Post Office	Simran Dhapwal	Indian National Congress	

== Functions ==
Nagar Palika Parishad Didihat is mandated to provide core civic amenities to the residents of the town, which include:

- Water Supply and Sanitation: Management of localized drinking water distribution systems and public drainage pipelines.
- Solid Waste Management: Daily waste collection, street cleaning, and disposal mechanisms across the municipal wards.
- Public Infrastructure: Construction and maintenance of interior town roads, civic pathways, and public street lighting systems.
- Civic Registrations: Maintaining official records and issuing certificates for vital statistics including births and deaths.
- Revenue Collection: Assessment and collection of local property and municipal taxes to fund infrastructure projects.

== Public Health and Facilities ==
The municipality houses localized community infrastructure. Primary medical care and emergency services within its jurisdiction are anchored by the Community Health Centre (CHC) Didihat, which links local healthcare requirements to the regional district hospital.

== Election results ==
The Didihat Municipal Council holds direct elections every five years in the state and the latest elections were those held in the year 2025.

=== Chairperson ===
Year	No. of Wards	Winner			Runner Up		Margin			
Year	No. of Wards	2025	7		Indian National Congress	Girish Chuphal	Margin	Independent	Lalit Mohan Kaphaliya	124
2018		Bharatiya Janata Party	7	Kamla Chuphal	Dhana Devi	17		Independent		

2025 Didihat Nagar Palika Parishad Election: President
Party	Candidate	Votes	%	±%
INC	Girish Chuphal	1,089	39.86	New
Independent	Lalit Mohan Kaphaliya	965	35.32	New
BJP	Lokesh Singh Bhad	661	24.19	New
NOTA	None of the above	17	0.62	New
Majority		124	4.54	
Total votes		2,732	100.00	
INC gain from BJP		Swing		

=== Ward-wise ===
==== 2025 ====
Didihat Municipal Council
Party	Won	+/−
Indian National Congress	3	Steady
Bharatiya Janata Party	3	Steady
Independents	1	Steady
Total	7	Steady

==== 2018 ====
Didihat Municipal Council
Party	Won	+/−
Bharatiya Janata Party	3	
Indian National Congress	3	
Independents	1	
Total	7	

== See also ==
- Didihat (Uttarakhand Assembly constituency)
- Pithoragarh district
