= Didihat =

- Town
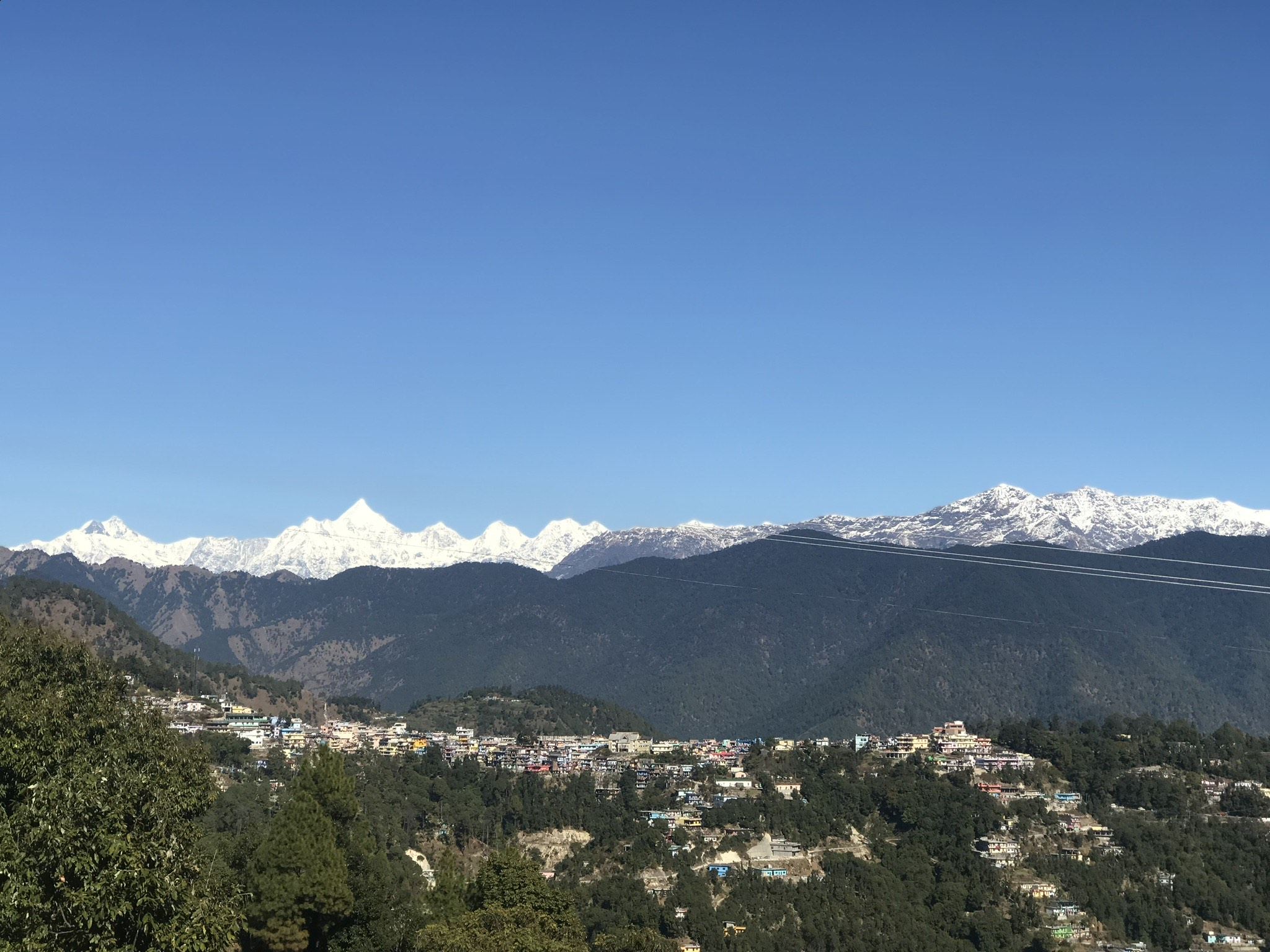
- Didihat Town and Panchachuli peaks in the background

- Location of Didihat in India Didihat (India)
- Coordinates: 29.7994255°N 80.2362226°E
- Country: India
- State: Uttarakhand
- Division: Kumaon
- District: Pithoragarh

Government
  - Type: Municipal Council
  - Body: Didihat Municipal Council
  - Chairperson: Girish Chuphal (INC)
  - MLA: Bishan Singh Chuphal (BJP)
  - Lok Sabha MP: Ajay Tamta (BJP)

Area
  - Total: 4 km^{2} (1.5 sq mi)
- Elevation: 1,850 m (6,070 ft)

Population (2011)
  - Total: 6,522
  - Density: 1,600/km^{2} (4,200/sq mi)

Languages
  - Official: Hindi
- Time zone: UTC+5:30 (IST)
- PIN: 262551

Didihat is a town and a Nagar Palika in Pithoragarh District in the state of Uttarakhand, India. It is one of the eleven administrative subdivisions of Pithoragarh district and also serves as its administrative headquarters. With a population of 6522, Didihat is located at a distance of 415 km (258 mi) from the state capital Dehradun.

Didihat is named after the Kumauni word 'Dand' meaning a small hillock. Didihat falls on the pilgrimage route to Kailash Mansarovar. Earlier it was known as “Digtad”. Present day name Didihat is derived from Hat Tharp village which is the heart of this town.

== History ==
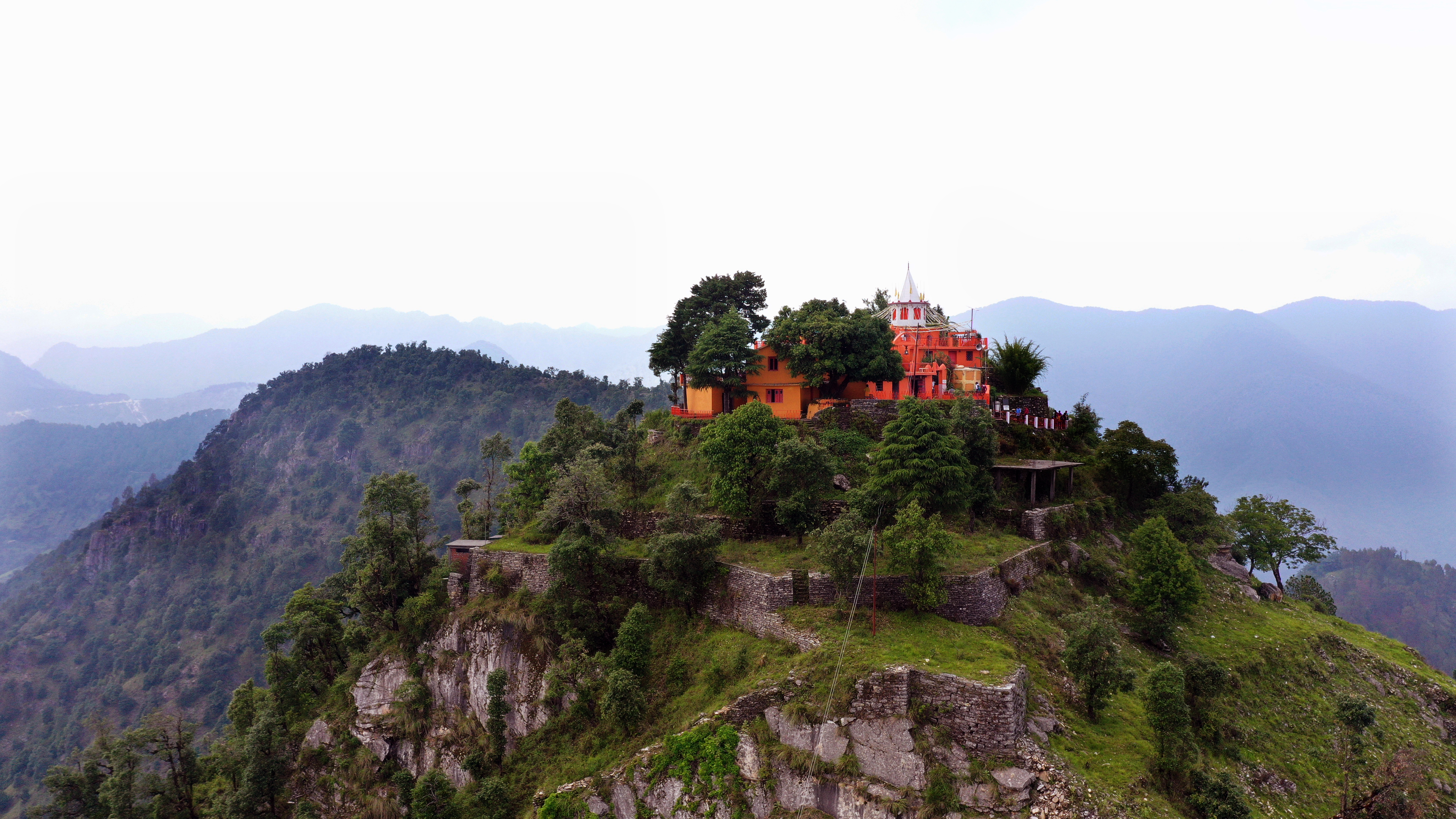
Malaynath Temple at Sirakot was built by the Raika Kings.

The area of present-day Didihat was ruled by the Katyuri dynasty. Until the time of King Hari Malla, this region was within the Doti principality established by the Katyuri dynasty. After the fall of the Katyuris, the region came under the rule of the Malla kings of Sirakot. The ancient Shirakot Temple of Lord Malay Nath was built by the Raika Kings of Doti. In 1581, when Rudra Chand ruled the Chand dynasty, this region came under the control of Chand rulers, who defeated the Raikas of Doti. Remnants of ancient forts and temples remain present in Didihat to this day.

Didihat was a Tehsil in the Almora district of United Provinces in 1947 when India won its Independence from Britain. The Didihat Tehsil, along with other north-eastern parts of Almora district, was transferred to the newly created Pithoragarh district in 1960. During 2001-2011, the new tehsil Berinag was created by transferring 298 villages from the Didihat tehsil. The creation of a new district, Didihat, was declared on 15 August 2011 by then Chief Minister of Uttarakhand, Ramesh Pokhriyal. However, the district is yet to be officially formed.

== Geography ==
Didihat lies at 29.97°N 80.15°E in Northern India at 1,725 m (5,659 ft) above sea level, in Pithoragarh district of Uttarakhand, India. It is located at a distance of 43 km (27 mi) from District Headquarters Pithoragarh. It covers an area of 4 km^{2} (1.5 sq mi). The nearest city with a population of one lakh and more is Haldwani (235 km (146 mi)) while the nearest city with a population of five lakh and more is Bareilly (285 km (177 mi)).

According to the Bureau of Indian Standards, the town falls under seismic zone 5, in a scale of 2 to 5 (in order of increasing vulnerability to earthquakes). Didihat has been struck by flash floods two times; on 20 July 2003 and 13 August 2007. Four people lost their lives in both these disasters. In Didihat, flash floods are very common hydro-meteorological hazards due to excessive rainfall or snowmelt, bursting of dams, cloudburst, etc.

== Demographics ==
Historical population
Year	Pop.	±%
1981	2,044	—
1991	3,514	+71.9%
2001	4,806	+36.8%
2011	6,522	+35.7%
Source: Census of India

Religions in Didihat
Religion	Percent
Hinduism	96.15%
Islam	3.11%
Others	0.70%

According to the 2011 Census of India, the population of Didihat Nagar Palika was 6,522. Didihat has a literacy rate of 91.03%; 95.20% of the men and 86.44% of the women are literate. Didihat's sex ratio in 2011 was 889 women per 1000 men. Almost all of the residents of Didihat are native Kumaonis. About 20.55% of the population belongs to the Scheduled Castes, numbering over 1,340 in the 2011 census. In addition, the city is home to some 649 people, who belong to the Scheduled Tribes. Didihat is the native place of 'Rajis', a Scheduled Tribe. Approximately 1,400 people live in slums within the city. Didihat had a population of 4805 according to the 2001 Census and 3514 according to the 1991 Census of India.

== Economy ==
Didihat had traditionally been a place where merchants from adjoining areas brought their goods for sale on a prescribed day of the week. Wool and salt from Tibet were exchanged for grain here. The "Kumaon Scheduled Tribes Development Corporation" established a "Carpet Center", a "Blanket Production Center" and a "Wool Production and Sales Center" at Didihat for the all-around economic-development of the Scheduled Tribes living here.

== Culture ==
Didihat observes a wide range of festivals. Popular celebrations and observances include Kumauni Holi, which is celebrated in different forms such as the Baithki Holi, the Khari Holi and the Mahila Holi. The festival of lights, Deepavali, is celebrated with the lighting of lamps in every house, decorating the floors with rangoli, and sharing of sweets with relatives and friends. Kumaoni is the mother tongue of the majority in Didihat; however people speak Hindi as well. The dialect of Kumaoni spoken in Didihat is called 'Sirali'.

Village Hat Tharp is famous for its Hiran Chital Festival during the rainy season. This village also conducts one of the oldest Ramlilas of the Didihat area.

Residents of the village of Hat Tharp conserved their forest by dedicating it to Maa Bhagwati of Pankhu for 10 years. Tree cutting is prohibited, and only the collection of dry wood is permitted.

== Tourism ==
Didihat is a Himalayan tourist destination situated 43 km from Pithoragarh. Didihat is situated on the hilltop plain of 'Digtarh' with the river Charamgad (Bhadigad) flowing below. Below the town there is a fertile 'Haat valley'. Within Didihat is the temple (mandir) known as Sirakot (Malaynath Mandir) of Lord Shiva (Bholenath). Another mandir is situated in the top hill of the nanpaupu village is known as dechula.

Views of Himalayan snow-capped peaks can be observed from Didihat, especially Panchachuli and Trishul. Didihat is known for the ancient Shirakot Temple of Lord Malay Nath, built by Raika Kings. Approximately 8 km from here, is Narayan Swamy Ashram at Narayan Nagar. The regional Headquarters of ITBP is situated at Merthi at 6 km from Didihat. Askot Musk Deer Sanctuary is administratively situated in Didihat Tehsil.

There’s a large stone bigger than a house in the middle of a field in Village Hat Tharp known as Bheem Ka Patthar; every year people of village worship there. It is believed Bheem brought that stone and left there.

About 53 km from Didihat, the small hilly town Berinag is known for its natural environment, its nag mandirs, and a small tea garden. One of the most well-known gufa is known as "Patal Bhuvaneshwar", this is related to "Pandavas" Dvapara Yuga.

== Administration ==
Didihat is a Class-V town and a nagar palika in Pithoragarh district in the state of Uttarakhand, India. The Didihat city is divided into 7 wards for which elections are held every 5 years. Didihat Municipality has a committee consisting of a chairman with ward members. Membership consists of a minimum of ten elected ward members and three nominated members. The Municipal Council members of the Nagar Palika are elected from the several wards of the Nagar Palika on the basis of adult franchise for a term of five years. Two Non-Notified Slums exist in Didihat; Nai Basti having 150 households and G.I.C. Ward with 180 households.

Administratively it is also a tehsil and a subdivision of the Pithoragarh district. Tehsil Didihat is divided into three developmental blocks—Didihat, Kanalichhina, and Berinag. Didihat tehsil is the second most populous tehsil in Pithoragarh and has the highest number of villages. There are about 367 villages in Didihat Tehsil.

== Transport ==
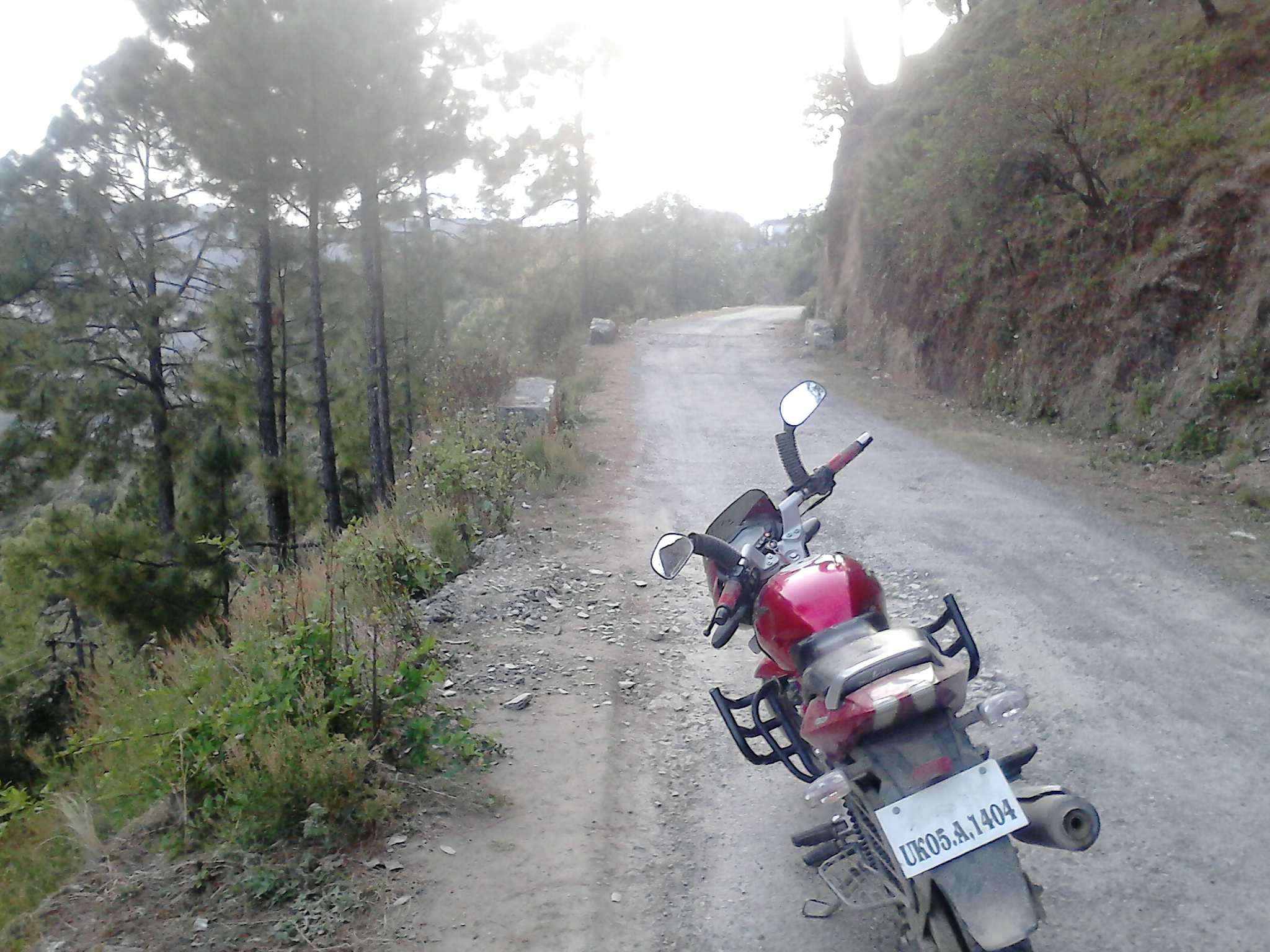
A Road in Didihat

Buses are the main form of transport that connect the town to the national capital Delhi and other cities. Buses are either run by state controlled Uttarakhand Transport Corporation or the private Kumaon Motor Owners Union. The nearest railway station to Didihat is Tanakpur (210 km (130 mi)).

== Education ==
Didihat had a literacy rate of 79% in 2001 which rose to 91.03 percent in 2011. As of 2011, literacy rate among male and female were 95.20 and 86.44 percent respectively. Schools in Didihat are run either by the municipal corporation, or privately by entities, trusts and corporations. The majority of schools are affiliated with the Uttarakhand Board of School Education, although some are affiliated with the Central Board for Secondary Education, Council for the Indian School Certificate Examinations and National Institute of Open Schooling.
