= 2025 Roorkee Municipal Corporation election =

Election to the municipal corporation of Roorkee

- 23 January 2025

All 40 seats in the Roorkee Municipal Corporation 21 seats needed for a majority

	Majority party	Minority party	Third party
Leader	Anita Agarwal	Pooja Gupta	Satyavati Verma
Party	BJP	INC	BSP
Last election	17	2	1
Seats won	24	2	1
Seat change	▲7	Steady	Steady
	Fourth party
Leader	None
Party	Independent
Last election	20
Seats won	13
Seat change	▼7
Mayor before election
Gaurav Goyal
Independent
Elected mayor
Anita Agarwal
BJP

The 2025 Roorkee Municipal Corporation election was a municipal election to the Roorkee Municipal Corporation which governs Roorkee city in Uttarakhand. It took place on 23 January 2025.

== Election schedule ==
The election schedule was announced by the state election commission on 23 December 2024.

Poll Event	Schedule
Notification Date	27 December 2024
Last Date for filing nomination	30 December 2024
Scrutiny of nomination	31 December 2024
Last Date for Withdrawal of nomination	2 January 2025
Allotment of Symbols	3 January 2025
Date of Poll	23 January 2025
Date of Counting of Votes	25 January 2025

== Candidates ==
=== Mayoral election ===
No.	Party	Symbol	Candidate's Name
1	Bharatiya Janata Party		Anita Agarwal
2	Indian National Congress		Pooja Gupta

=== Ward-wise candidates ===
Ward No.	Ward Name				
Ward No.	Ward Name	BJP		INC	
1	Sherpur	BJP	Kanika	INC	Sudesh
2	Adarsh Nagar	BJP	Sachin Kashyap	INC	Ashish Saini
3	Solanipuram	BJP	Devaki Joshi	INC	
4	Khanjarpur	BJP	Pratigya	INC	Deepa
5	CBRI	BJP	Preeti Bharadwaj	INC	
6	IIT Roorkee	BJP	Rajan Goyal	INC	Tushar Arora
7	Civil Lines Central	BJP	Akash Jain	INC	Ravinder Khanna
8	Jadugar Road	BJP	Satveer Singh	INC	Manoj Kumar Sharma
9	Northern Mohanpura	BJP	Pratima Paul	INC	Renu Devi
10	Southern Mohanpura	BJP	Mayank Paul	INC	
11	Defence Colony	BJP	Vinay Kumar	INC	
12	Asaf Nagar Roorkee	BJP	Ankit Gautam	INC	
13	Civil Lines South	BJP	Navneet Sharma	INC	Ravindra Kumar Khewaria
14	Preet Vihar	BJP	Anurag Tyagi	INC	
15	Purvavali	BJP	Neetu Sharma	INC	
16	Southern Ganeshpur	BJP	Sandeep Yadav	INC	Nitin Kumar
17	Sheikhpuri	BJP	Sanjeev Tomar	INC	Sanjay Kumar
18	Northern Ganeshpur	BJP	Kuldeep Tomar	INC	Ravi Tomar
19	Shivpuram	BJP	Veera Devi	INC	Manu Jain
20	Chavmandi	BJP	Rishu Verma	INC	Mamata Saini
21	Subhash Nagar	BJP	Yajur Prajapati	INC	Naeem Ahmed
22	Krishna Nagar	BJP	Alka Saini	INC	Vishakha Saini
23	Salempur Rajputana	BJP	Shivani Saini	INC	
24	Salempur Industrial Centre	BJP		INC	Pooja Dhariwal
25	Ramnagar	BJP	Pankaj Satija	INC	
26	Awas Vikas	BJP	Rakesh Garg	INC	
27	Maktulpuri	BJP	Vibha Saini	INC	
28	Deendayal East	BJP	Subodh Yadav	INC	Mohammad Tahir
29	Saket	BJP	Dheeraj Pal	INC	Rohit Kumar
30	Ambar Talab West	BJP	Sudhir Kumar Jatav	INC	Charu Chandra
31	Ambar Talab East	BJP	Seema Verma	INC	
32	World Bank Colony	BJP	Shivam Agarwal	INC	Harshil Singh
33	Sot	BJP	Sanjeev Rai	INC	Mubashir
34	Sati	BJP		INC	Mohsin Ali
35	Mahigran	BJP		INC	Mahzabi
36	Bharat Nagar	BJP	Shama Praveen	INC	Shahnaz Sahil
37	Purani Tehsil	BJP	Avnish Sharma	INC	Manju Kashyap
38	Sunehra	BJP	Manish Valmiki	INC	Lakshmi Chand
39	Kashipuri	BJP	Pravesh Dhiman	INC	Abdul Basit
40	Matlabpur	BJP	Nabh Maurya	INC	Pankaj Ashtwal

== Results ==
=== Mayoral election ===
2025 Roorkee Municipal Corporation Election: Mayor
Party	Candidate	Votes	%	±%
BJP	Anita Agarwal	35,008	37.99	▲15.79
Independent	Shreshtha Rana	32,157	34.9	New
INC	Pooja Gupta	18,417	19.99	▼9.74
BSP	Satyavati Verma	3,671	3.98	▼1.33
NOTA	None of the above	341	0.38	▼0.03
AAP	Sumita	249	0.27	▼0.21
Majority		2,851	3.09	▼0.91
Turnout		92,127		
BJP gain from Independent		Swing	▲15.79	

=== Results by party ===
Party	Seats					
Party	±pp	Contested	Won	+/−		
Bharatiya Janata Party				37	24	▲7
Indian National Congress				22	2	Steady
Other parties				3	1 (Note: BSP won Ward No. 1 Sherpur.)	Steady
Independents				95	13	▼7
NOTA						
Total		100%			40	

== See also ==
- 2025 Uttarakhand local elections
- 2019 Roorkee Municipal Corporation election
- 2025 Dehradun Municipal Corporation election
- 2025 Pithoragarh Municipal Corporation election
- 2025 Haridwar Municipal Corporation election
- 2025 Haldwani Municipal Corporation election
- 2025 Rudrapur Municipal Corporation election
- 2025 Kotdwar Municipal Corporation election
- 2025 Rishikesh Municipal Corporation election
- 2025 Almora Municipal Corporation election
- 2025 Kashipur Municipal Corporation election
- 2025 Srinagar Municipal Corporation election
