= Sultanpur, Uttarakhand =

Sultanpur Patti Sultanpur Patti
- Location in Uttarakhand, India Sultanpur Patti (India)
- Coordinates: 29°45′21.731″N 78°6′29.794″E
- Country: India
- State: Uttarakhand
- District: Udham Singh Nagar

Government
  - Type: Nagar panchayat

Population (2011)
  - Total: 9,881

Languages
  - Official: Hindi
  - Native: Tharu, Kauravi
- Time zone: UTC+5:30 (IST)
- Postal code: 244713
- Vehicle registration: UK-18
- Website: uk.gov.in

Sultanpur is a town in Udham Singh Nagar district in the Indian state of Uttarakhand. It is located approximately 15 kilometres (9.3 mi) from Kashipur and 42 kilometres (26 mi) from Rudrapur.

== Location ==
Sultanpur is located in the Terai tract, which runs from the Uttar Pradesh border to the Haldwani at north. It is at the east bank of the holy Koshi river, which is well known for its illegal mining of sand.

== Administration and politics ==
Sultanpur patti falls in the Bazpur Legislative assembly of the Uttarakhand state. The local MLA is Yashpal Arya. The town is in charge of the Chairman & Executive Officer. It has a committee consisting of a chairman with ward members. It is divided into seven wards for election purposes. Namely Shivnagar, aryanagar, tanda-banjara, gandhinagar, adarshnagar, netanagar and shyamnagar. Municipal elections are held once every five years, with results being decided by popular vote. Elections to the Sultanpur patti were held in 2025, and Rajeev Kumar, BJP candidate was elected. Sharma defeated Sajjid Hussain, an independent candidate by 1,044 votes.

== Civil administration ==
The local police station is the substation of nearest Bajpur thana, which is headed by a Sub-inspector-level officer.

== Transport ==
Train service in Sultanpur started in 1905, upon the construction of a branch line by Kumaon Railway connecting Lalkuan line with Kashipur. Sultanpur railway Halt (was station until 2006) lies on the Kashipur-Lalkuan Broad gauge railway line and the city falls under the Izzatnagar railway division of North Eastern Railway Zone of Indian Railways. A major National highways run through Sultanpur. National Highway 309, which runs from Malaut in Punjab to Pithoragarh in Uttarakhand passes through Sultanpur. Other roads starting from here connect it to Rampur via Maswasi. Sultanpur has no Bus station. The demand of a permanent station is on fire by the locals.

== Education ==
1. Government primary school Sultanpur l
2. Government primary school sultanpur ll
3. Government Urdumedium school sultanpur
4. Government Girls Intercollege sultanpur
5. S.N.sharma Government boys intercollege sultanpur
6. Sarswati shishu vidya mandir Sultanpur
7. Government Polytechnic Bazpur. (https://www.gpbazpur.in)
