= Rudrapur Municipal Corporation =

Civic body that governs the city of Rudrapur in Uttarakhand, India

Rudrapur Municipal Corporation रुद्रपुर नगर निगम Rudrapur Nagar Nigam
- Unicameral Legislature

Type
- Type: Municipal Corporation

Leadership
- Mayor: Vikas Sharma, BJP since 7 February 2025
- Municipal Commissioner: Naresh Durgapal, IAS

Structure
- Seats: 40
- Political groups: Government (21): BJP (21); Opposition (19): INC (14); IND (5)

Elections
- Voting system: First-past-the-post
- Last election: 23 January 2025
- Next election: 2030

Meeting place
- Nagar Nigam Bhavan, Rudrapur

Website
- Nagar Nigam Rudrapur

The Rudrapur Municipal Corporation is the highest governing body of the city of Rudrapur in Uttarakhand, India.

== Structure ==
This corporation consists of 40 wards and is headed by a mayor who presides over a deputy mayor and 39 other corporators representing the wards. The mayor is elected directly through a first-past-the-post voting system and the deputy mayor is elected by the corporators from among their numbers.

== List of mayors ==
S. No.	Name	Term			Party
1	Soni Koli	3 May 2013	3 May 2018	5 years, 0 days	Bharatiya Janata Party
Administrator		3 May 2018	2 December 2018	212 days	Government of Uttarakhand
2	Rampal Singh	2 December 2018	2 December 2023	5 years, 0 days	Bharatiya Janata Party
Administrator		2 December 2023	6 February 2025	1 year, 66 days	Government of Uttarakhand
3	Vikas Sharma	7 February 2025	Incumbent	1 year, 247 days	Bharatiya Janata Party

== List of Municipal Commissioners ==
S.No.	Name	Duration From	Duration To
1	Nidhi Yadav PCS	30 March 2013	17 February 2014
2	Deepti Singh PCS	18 February 2014	7 September 2014
3	Tirth Pal Singh PCS	8 September 2014	4 March 2015
4	Deepti Singh PCS	2 March 2015	12 October 2015
5	Jogdande Vijay Kumar IAS	13 October 2015	7 February 2016
6	Deepti Singh PCS	8 February 2016	14 August 2017
7	Jai Bharat Singh PCS	15 August 2017	18 September 2020
8	Rinku Bisht PCS	1 October 2020	7 September 2021
9	Vishal Mishra IAS	7 September 2021	15 July 2022
10	Naresh Chandra Durgapal	15 July 2022	

== Current members ==
Rudrapur Municipal Corporation has a total of 40 members or corporators, who are directly elected after a term of 5 years. The council is led by the Mayor. The latest elections were held in 23 January 2025. The current mayor of Rudrapur is Vikas Sharma of the Bharatiya Janata Party.

Mayor: Vikas Sharma
Ward No	Ward Name	Name of Corporator	Party	Remarks
1	Phulsunga/Phulsungi	Pawan Kumar Rana	Bharatiya Janata Party	
2	Transit Camp East	Mahendra Pal	Bharatiya Janata Party	
3	Transit Camp Central	Shubham Das	Indian National Congress	
4	Transit Camp West	Sushil Mandal	Indian National Congress	
5	Mukherjee Nagar	Kusum Sharma	Bharatiya Janata Party	
6	Jagatpura	Nimit Kumar Sharma	Bharatiya Janata Party	
7	Azadnagar	Kailash Rathore	Bharatiya Janata Party	
8	Vivek Nagar	Shiv Kumar	Bharatiya Janata Party	
9	Shiv Nagar	Rajendra Rathore	Bharatiya Janata Party	
10	Raja Colony/Thakur Nagar	Mukesh Kumar Rastogi	Bharatiya Janata Party	
11	Sanjay Nagar	Neetu	Independent	
12	Audyogik Kshetra	Mahendri Sharma	Bharatiya Janata Party	
13	Dudhiya Nagar	Mohammad Ashfaque	Indian National Congress	
14	Bhadaipura	Jagdeep Bhatia	Independent	
15	Paharganj	Nuruddin Ahmed	Bharatiya Janata Party	
16	Bigwada	Pramod Kumar Sharma	Bharatiya Janata Party	
17	Khera South	Shalu Pal	Independent	
18	Khera Central	Vikki Ansari	Independent	
19	Khera North	Sunil Kumar	Bharatiya Janata Party	
20	Bhootbangla Northeast	Sabir Qureshi	Indian National Congress	
21	Bhootbangla Southwest	Girish Kumar	Bharatiya Janata Party	
22	Rampura East	Poonam	Bharatiya Janata Party	
23	Rampura Central	Anjali	Indian National Congress	
24	Rampura West	Soni	Independent	
25	Fazalpur Mehraula	Priyanka Gupta	Bharatiya Janata Party	
26	Seergotia	Shanno	Indian National Congress	
27	Gandhi Colony	Madhu Sharma	Indian National Congress	
28	Mukhya Bazaar	Chirag Kalra	Indian National Congress	
29	Adarsh Colony SRA	Suman Rana	Indian National Congress	
30	D1D2	Gaurav Khurana	Indian National Congress	
31	Alliance Colony	Pooja Munjal	Bharatiya Janata Party	
32	Bhurarani	Gaurav Giri	Indian National Congress	
33	Singh Colony	Sushil Chauhan	Bharatiya Janata Party	
34	Indira Colony	Indrajeet Singh	Indian National Congress	
35	Adarsh Indira Colony	Saro Ray	Bharatiya Janata Party	
36	Adarsh Colony Ghas Mandi	Jitesh Sharma	Indian National Congress	
37	Kalyani New/Ravindra Nagar	Vishnu	Bharatiya Janata Party	
38	Awas Vikas West	Rajesh Kumar Jagga	Bharatiya Janata Party	
39	Awas Vikas East	Saurabh Bahed	Indian National Congress	
40	Sidkul	Beenu	Bharatiya Janata Party	

== Election results ==
The Rudrapur Municipal Corporation holds direct elections every five years in the state and the latest elections were those held in the year 2025.

=== Mayoral ===
Year	No. of Wards	Winner				Runner Up				Margin
Year	No. of Wards	Party	Candidate	Votes	%	Party	Candidate	Votes	%	Margin
2025	40	Bharatiya Janata Party	Vikas Sharma	54,069	55.96	INC	Mohan Khera	41,148	42.59	12,921

=== Ward-wise ===
==== 2025 ====
Rudrapur Municipal Corporation
Party	Won	+/−
Bharatiya Janata Party	21	▲4
Indian National Congress	14	▼3
Independents	5	▼1
Total	40	

== See also ==
- 2025 Rudrapur Municipal Corporation election
