= 2026 Uttarakhand local elections =

Uttarakhand elections

June 2026 Uttarakhand municipal elections
- 9 June 2026 (21 seats)

21 seats of the urban local bodies in Uttarakhand
- Turnout: 76.36% (▲10.95 pp)

	First party	Second party	Third party
Leader	Mahendra Bhatt	Ganesh Godiyal	none
Party	BJP	INC	Independent
Leader since	2022	2025
Last election	2	1	5
Seats won	5 (Note: Excludes Abhishek Sukhuja and Narayan Lal who are BJP members but were not the official party candidate. However, officially they fought as an independent candidate.)	3	13 (Note: Includes Abhishek Sukhuja and Narayan Lal who are BJP members but were not the official party candidate. However, officially they fought as an independent candidate.)
Seat change	▲3	▲2	▲8

September 2026 Uttarakhand municipal elections
- 22 September 2026 (26 seats)

26 seats of the urban local bodies in Uttarakhand

Leader	Mahendra Bhatt	Ganesh Godiyal	none
Party	BJP	INC	Independent
Leader since	2022	2025
Last election	6	4	11

The 2026 Uttarakhand Municipal elections were held on 9 June 2026 to elect members of 3 municipalities and on 22 September to elect 2 municipalities in the state whose election could not happen with 100 other municipalites in 2025. The election results to the first 2 municipal committees and 1 municipal council was declared on 11 June and the counting of votes and the declaration of results was done on 24 September for the other 2 municipal councils.

Though the Bharatiya Janata Party won the Narendranagar municipality's chairman post unopposed and won a majority of the wards in the municipality, it faced setbacks in the newly formed rural to urban bodies of Pati and Garhinegi. The elected chairpersons of Garhinegi and Pati were incidentally BJP rebels who had been denied ticket by the party. They affirmed their support to the party after their victory. While both the BJP and the Congress did not field candidates in wards of Pati and Garhinegi, Congress did not contest in any municipal chairman post. The party only fielded candidates in wards of Narendranagar municipality, of which it won 3. Ultimately both BJP and independent candidates emerged as the top getters securing 9 seats each.

== Background ==
The local body elections in Kichha, Pati, Sirauli Kalan (disputed at the time), Narendranagar and Garhinegi were initially delayed due to ward delimitation updates and caste-based reservation revisions. Following the declaration for the schedule for the 100 other urban local bodies in December 2024, the State Election Commission officially separated the remaining urban councils due to delayed boundary restructuring and prepared the rollout for the rural panchayat layout. Finally on 25 May 2026, the election commission announced the schedule for elections for these bodies. Despite this however, elections in Kichha remained suspended due to judicial and delimitation issues. Finally on 7 September the same year, the election commission announced the schedule for election to Kichha and the municipal council carved out of it, Sirauli Kalan.

== Election schedule ==
The election schedule was announced by the state election commission on 25 May 2026 for the municipalities of Pati, Garhinegi and Narendranagar. The schedule for Kichha and Sirauli Kalan was announced by the commission on 7 September 2026.

Schedule of 2026 Uttarakhand Local Body Elections
Poll event	Phases	
Poll event	I	II
Notification date	27 May 2026	7 September 2026
Last date for filing nomination	29 May 2026	11 September 2026
Scrutiny of nomination	30 May 2026	12 September 2026
Last date for withdrawal of nomination	31 May 2026	13 September 2026
Allotment of symbols	1 June 2026	14 September 2026
Date of poll	9 June 2026	22 September 2026
Date of counting of votes	11 June 2026	24 September 2026

== Parties and Alliance ==
Alliance/Party	Flag	Symbol	Leader	Seats Contested (chairperson)
Bharatiya Janata Party			Mahendra Bhatt	4
Indian National Congress			Ganesh Godiyal	2

== Voter turnout ==
District	Seats (Chairpersons)	Turnout (%)
Tehri Garhwal	1	56.62 (lowest)
Champawat	1	77.99
Udham Singh Nagar	3	TBD (Note: 90.61 (highest) in June election in 1 seat.)
Total	5	76.36

== Results ==
=== Municipal Council Chairperson ===
Municipal Council Chairperson election
S. No.	Municipal Council	District	Winning candidate	Winning party	Runner up	Runner up party	Margin
1	Narendranagar	Tehri Garhwal	Rajendra Vikram Singh Panwar	Bharatiya Janata Party	Won uncontested		
2	Kichha	Udham Singh Nagar	Rajesh Pratap Singh	Indian National Congress	Sandeep Arora	Bharatiya Janata Party	6,077
3	Siroli Kalan	Udham Singh Nagar	Rashida Begum	Indian National Congress	Farheen Jahan	Independent	1,773

=== Nagar Panchayat Chairpersons ===
Nagar Panchayat Chairpersons election
S. No.	Nagar Panchayat	District	Winning candidate	Winning party	Runner up	Runner up party	Margin
1	Pati	Champawat	Narayan Lal	Independent	Naveen Ram	Bharatiya Janata Party	164
2	Garhinegi	Udham Singh Nagar	Abhishekh Sukhija	Independent	Sachin Bathla	Bharatiya Janata Party	94

== See also ==
- 2025 Uttarakhand local elections
- 2026 elections in India
