= Ghansali =

Town in Uttarakhand, India

Coordinates: 29°59′N 78°33′E

Ghansali (Village ID: 42916) is a town located in the Ghansali Tehsil of Tehri Garhwal district in Uttarakhand, India. The village's foundations were laid in 1925 by Hari Nanda Surira, who was a timber merchant. On the western side of the town lies the Bhilangana River, while a dense forest is located on the town's eastern side. According to the 2011 census, it had a total population of 392, living in 82 households. The town's primary agricultural product is paddies.

Every year a fair is organized at Hanuman Temple.

Ghansali is situated 3 km (1.9 mi) from the sub-district headquarters of Ghansali, and 75 km (47 mi) from the district headquarters of the city of New Tehri. Ghansali is also located 59 km (37 mi) from New Tehri, and 127 km (79 mi) from Gaurikund (Kedarnath) via Tilwara. The nearest railway stations that can be used to reach Ghansali are located in Dehradun and Rishikesh, and its nearest airport, located about 130 km (80 mi) away, is Jolly Grant Airport.

== Significance ==
Ghansali is located along an important route for pilgrimages to the Hindu religious site of Char Dham.

Ghansali is the tehsil headquarters of the Bhilangana block in Uttarakhand State. Ghansali is situated near the banks of Bhilangana River, which is a tributary of Bhagirathi River.

== Transportation ==
=== By road ===
It lies near National Highway 94 which connects Yamunotri from Rishikesh and National Highway 109 which connects Kedarnath from Rudraprayag .

=== By rail ===
The nearest train station from ghansali is Yog Nagari Rishikesh railway station which is 150 km(93 mi) away from Ghansali.

=== By air ===
The nearest airport form ghansali is Jollygrant airport which is 156 km away from Ghansali.
