= Chiliyanaula =

Town in Uttarakhand, India

- Town
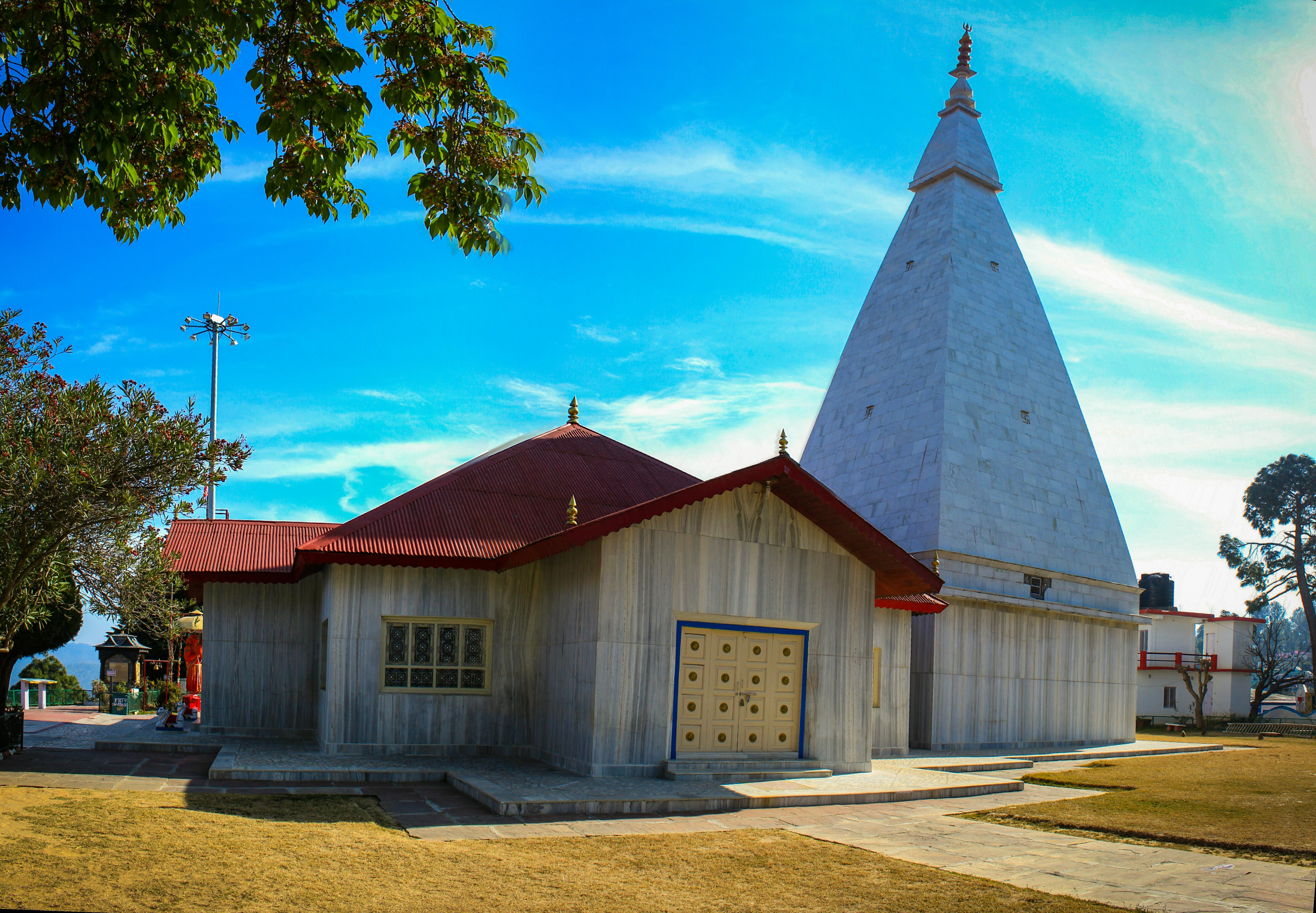
- Haidakhan temple at Chilyanaula

- Location in Uttarakhand, India Chiliyanaula (India)
- Coordinates: 29.6626°N 79.4108°E
- Country: India
- State: [ Uttarakhand
- District: Almora
- Tehsil: Ranikhet
- Elevation: 1,805 m (5,922 ft)

Population (2011)
  - Total: 20,441

Languages
  - Official: Hindi
  - Regional: Kumaoni
- Time zone: UTC+05:30 (IST)
- PIN: 263645
- Vehicle registration: UK 20
- Lok Sabha: Almora
- Vidhan Sabha: Ranikhet

Chiliyanaula is a small hill town and locality in Almora district, Uttarakhand, India. It is situated in the Kumaon region of the Himalayas, near Ranikhet, and is known for its scenic mountain surroundings, pleasant climate, and views of the Himalayan ranges.

== Etymology ==
The name of the town, Chiliyanaula, is made of two words: Cheli and Naula. Cheli means daughter and Naula means "natural source of water or well" in Kumaoni language.

== Geography ==
Chiliyanaula is located in the central Himalayan region of Uttarakhand, at approximately 29.66°N 79.41°E. The town lies at an elevation of about 1,800–2,000 metres above sea level and is surrounded by hills, valleys and forested slopes. The terrain is predominantly mountainous, with settlements and agricultural areas distributed along the slopes.

The vegetation of the surrounding area includes (Pinus roxburghii), oak (Quercus), buransh (Rhododendron arboreum) and deodar (Deodar Cedar) forests that host a large variety of fauna, such as leopards, rhesus monkeys, pine martens, Himalayan langur, dhole, rabbits, barking deer, sambar, and more. Exotic plants of Chiliyanaula include Ginkgo biloba and saffron.The region receives most of its annual rainfall during the southwest monsoon, while winters are cool and may occasionally experience snowfall.

== Climate ==
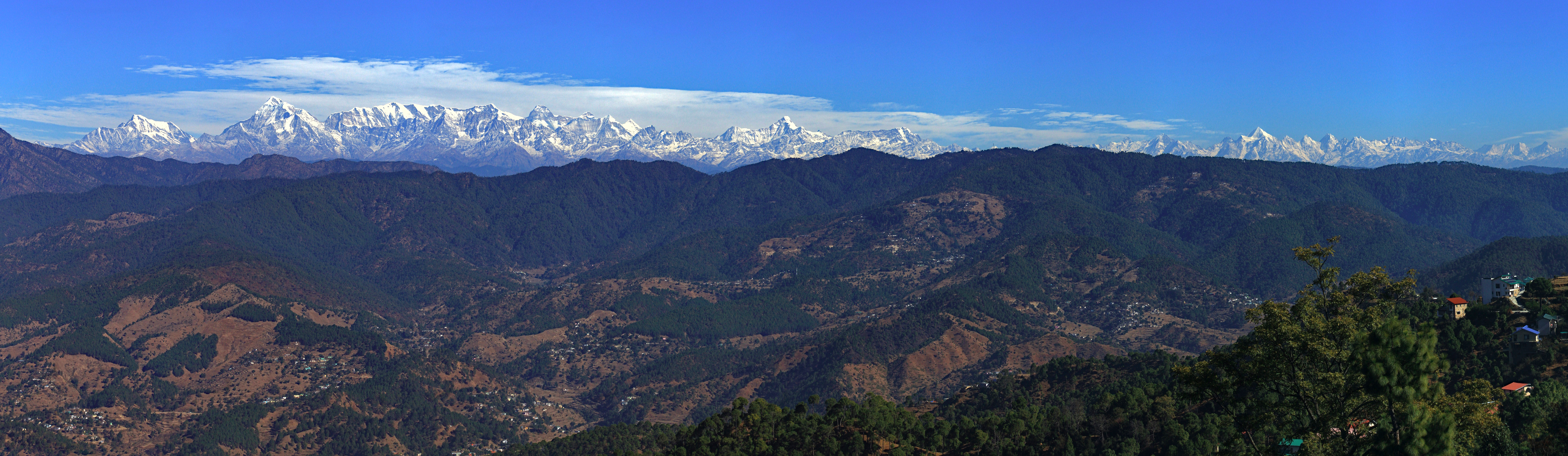
A panoramic view of the Kumaon Himalayas from Ranikhet, showing Trisul (7,120 m (23,360 ft)), Nanda Devi (7,817 m (25,646 ft)), Nanda Kot (6,861 m (22,510 ft)), Panchachuli (6,904 m (22,651 ft)) and other giant peaks.

Chiliyanaula has a subtropical highland climate, influenced by its elevation. Summers are generally mild compared with the plains of northern India, while winters are cold. The monsoon season brings substantial rainfall, particularly between June and September.

== History ==
Earlier, the place was known by the name of "Malla Badhan" (In Kumaoni it means Upper Badhan. Badhan is a village near Chiliyanaula). Until 1915, Chiliyanaula had just one small market surrounded by oak trees. Local tax collectors of the British government (known as Thokdar in Kumaoni language) used to stay in that during their travel to collect the taxes in neighboring villages.

This place had a lot of sources of natural water. In 1920, some local people upgraded those resources with basic constructions of stones and bricks and shaped them into wells. Those people named the constructed wells by the names of their daughters. Hence the place was called Cheli Naula ("Daughter's Wells") – which converted into Chiliyanaula as the time passed. Unfortunately, all the wells are dried now. Chiliyanaula established as a town in recent years. Before 1980, the town was just a street with few shops.

After 1980 when Haidakhan Ashram and G D Birla Memorial School kind of international institute established in this area, it shaped into a town. Today, Chiliyanaula is a Nagar Palika (municipal council) and turning into a city.

== Demographics ==
The population of Chiliyanaula consists primarily of people belonging to the various communities of the Kumaon region. Hindi and Kumaoni are widely spoken, while English is also used in educational and official contexts.
