= Banbasa =

- Town
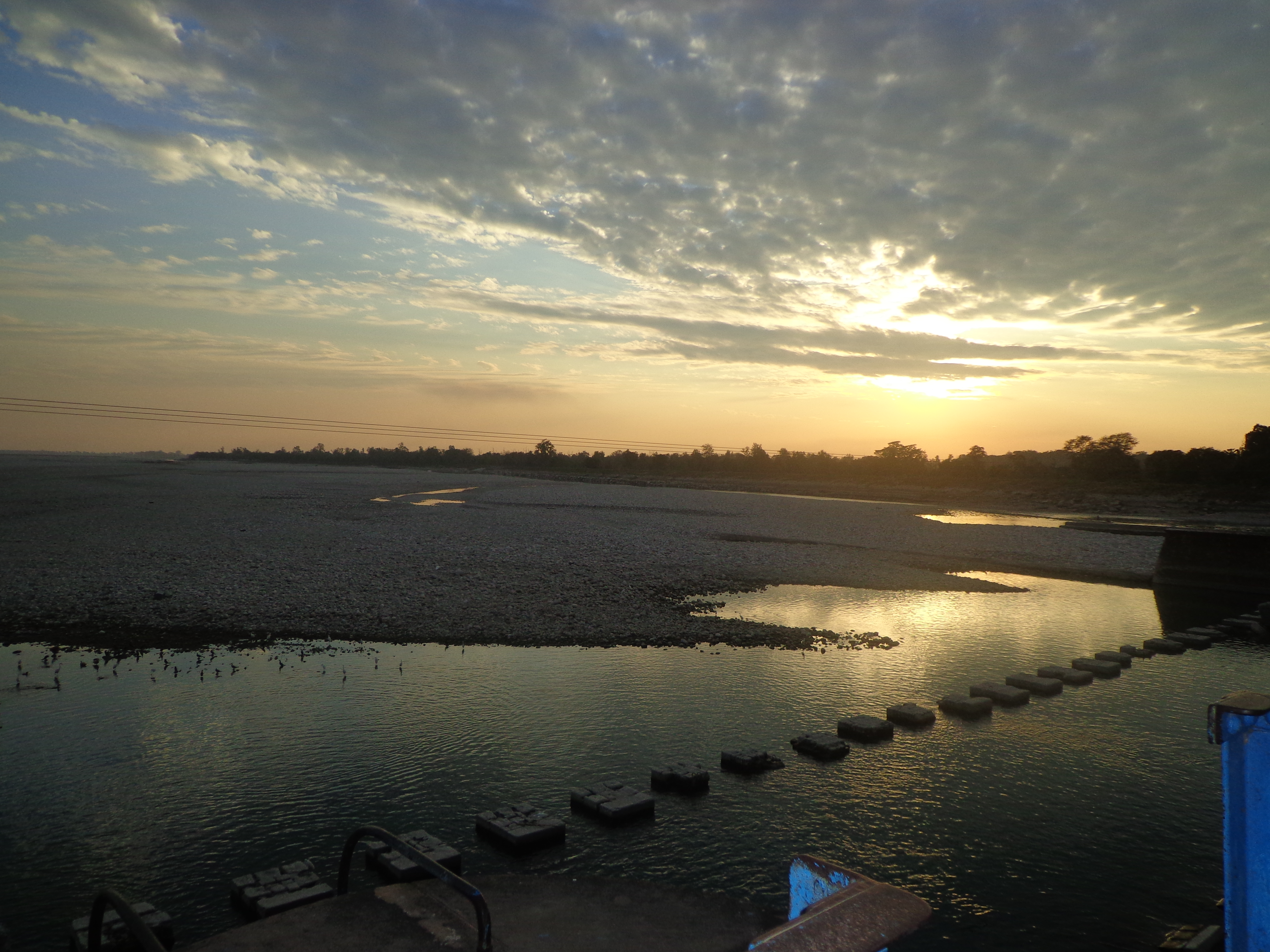
- Banbasa Canal Range

- Location in Uttarakhand, India Banbasa (India)
- Coordinates: 28.979913°N 80.080032°E
- Country: India
- State: Uttarakhand
- District: Champawat
- Elevation: 466 m (1,529 ft)

Population (2011)
  - Total: 7,990
- Time zone: UTC+5:30 (IST)
- PIN: 262310
- Telephone code: 91 5943
- Vehicle registration: UK-03
- Website: uk.gov.in

Banbasa is a nagar panchayat in Champawat district in the state of Uttarakhand, India most famous for its border crossing into Nepal from India. The major occupation is agriculture.

== Demographics ==
As of 2011 India census, Banbasa had a population of 7,990, up from 7,138 in 2001. The human sex ratio of Banbasa is 887, with 52% of the population being Male and other 48% female. Children constitute 12.22% of total population of Banbasa. The literacy rate of Banbasa is 77.19%. The Buksas and Tharus are the native inhabititants of the region.

It is located 10 km away from Tanakpur. Banbasa is known for the Banbasa Barrage and Dam across the Sharda river, its canal and what many consider the launching point for the trip up into the mountains on the Holy Purnagiri Pilgrimage.Extensive maintenance and renovation of the Canal was executed under Abinash Chandra Chaturvedi, Executive Engineer during 1962 to 64.The place abounds in sugarcane, paddy, wheat, mango orchards etc. and has a hot and humid climate, typical of the Terais, during summers, with heavy rains in late summers and hard winters.

To enter Banbassa from Delhi one passes through a 6 km stretch of jungle in which elephants, leopards, tigers, monkeys, bears, snakes, deer and many other species of wild animal are regularly seen. Much of Banbasa's outer population lives in the jungles that surround the town.

== The town and tourism ==
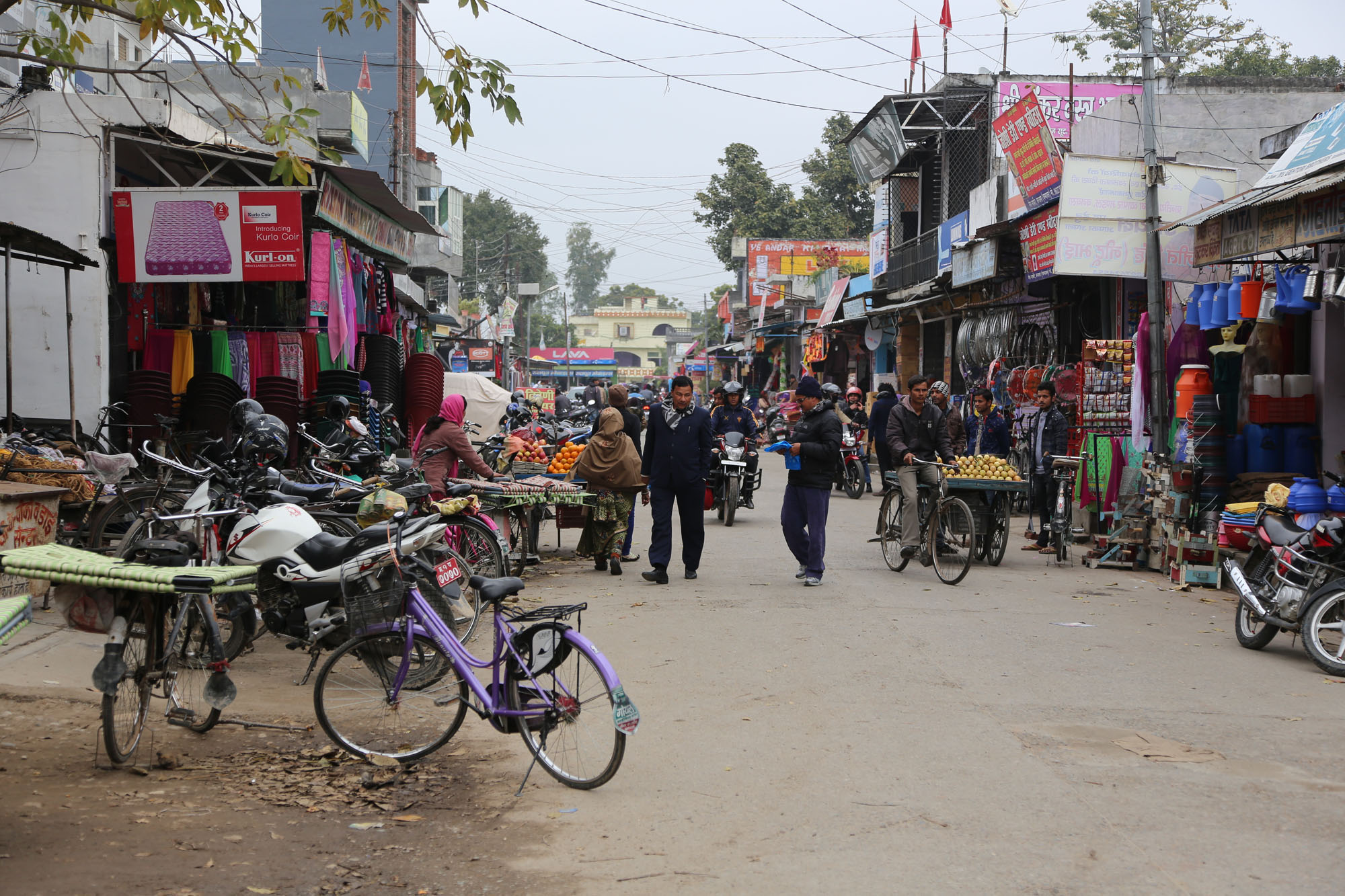
Street view of Banbasa

While Banbassa has several small hotels, it is not generally considered a 'tourist destination'. The majority of tourists and visitors that arrive in Banbasa are either crossing into Nepal (via Mahendranagar) or heading up in to the Himalayas and its hill stations.

Banbasa is a popular spot for people to cross into Nepal from India as there is an immigration office for both countries. The Nepal border is about 5 km from Banbasa and rickshaws, tuktuk or horse-drawn carts can be hired with ease. Vehicles can also cross the border into Nepal/India but specific times are held when this can happen (3-4 times per day).

== Transport ==
Buses run direct between Banbasa and Delhi, Agra, Bareilly, Rudrapur, Nanital, Haldwani, Dehradun, Haridwar, Amritsar, Chandigarh, Shimla and many other places. Most services have several timings but some only have 1-3 buses per day. Banbasa is one of the last stops before the Himalayan mountain climb begins on the road to Almorah, Champawat and Pithoragarh.

Trains also run to Banbasa, a direct line from Delhi via Bareilly.

Banbasa is near India's border with Nepal, across from the Mahendranagar municipality. Nepalese and Indian nationals may cross unrestricted, however there is a customs checkpoint for goods and third country nationals.

=== Education ===
One notable institution is Seemant Public School, a co-educational English-medium school located in Ward No. 7, Meena Bazar, Banbasa. It has been established by the Seemant Sewa Foundation (Trust).
