= Naugaon =

Village in Uttarakhand, India

Coordinates: 30°47′21.17″N 78°8′26.75″E

Naugaon is a village of approximately 500 people in the Uttarkashi district of the Indian state of Uttarakhand. It is situated beside the Yamuna river. It lies at the junction of Naugaon-Purola Rd and National Highway 507 near the towns Barkot, Purola and Damta.
