= Kashipur Municipal Corporation =

Civic body that governs the city of Kashipur in Uttarakhand, India

Kashipur Municipal Corporation काशीपुर नगर निगम Kashipur Nagar Nigam
- Unicameral Legislature

Type
- Type: Municipal Corporation

Leadership
- Mayor: Deepak Bali, BJP since 7 February 2025
- Municipal Commissioner: Ravindra Singh Bisht, PCS

Structure
- Seats: 40
- Political groups: Government (32): BJP (19); IND (13); Opposition (8): INC (8)

Elections
- Voting system: First-past-the-post
- Last election: 23 January 2025
- Next election: 2030

Meeting place
- Nagar Nigam Bhavan, Kashipur

Website
- Nagar Nigam Kashipur

The Kashipur Municipal Corporation is the civic body that governs the city of Kashipur in Uttarakhand, India.

== Structure ==
This corporation consists of 40 wards and is headed by a mayor who presides over a deputy mayor and 39 other corporators representing the wards. The mayor is elected directly through a first-past-the-post voting system and the deputy mayor is elected by the corporators from among their numbers.

== List of mayors ==
S. No.	Name	Term			Party
1	Usha Chaudhary	3 May 2013	3 May 2018	5 years, 0 days	Independent
Administrator		3 May 2018	2 December 2018	212 days	Government of Uttarakhand
(1)	Usha Chaudhary	2 December 2018	2 December 2023	5 years, 0 days	Bharatiya Janata Party
Administrator		2 December 2023	6 February 2025	1 year, 66 days	Government of Uttarakhand
3	Deepak Bali	7 February 2025	Incumbent	1 year, 113 days	Bharatiya Janata Party

== Current members ==
Kashipur Municipal Corporation has a total of 40 members or corporators, who are directly elected after a term of 5 years. The council is led by the Mayor. The latest elections were held in 23 January 2025. The current mayor of Kashipur is Deepak Bali of the Bharatiya Janata Party.

Mayor: Deepak Bali
Ward No	Ward Name	Name of Corporator	Party	Remarks
1	Rampura Nijhda	Beena Negi	Bharatiya Janata Party	
2	Jaspur Khurd	Sanjay Sharma	Bharatiya Janata Party	
3	Krishna Ward	Anil Kumar	Bharatiya Janata Party	
4	Khadakpur Devipur North	Seema Sagar	Bharatiya Janata Party	
5	Kanchanal Gausai	Kadir Ahmed	Indian National Congress	
6	Hempur Ismail North	Satish Kumar	Independent	
7	Hempur Ismail South	Anup Singh	Independent	
8	Khadakpura Devipur East	Kuldeep Sharma	Independent	
9	Khadakpur Devipur Central	Abhishek	Bharatiya Janata Party	
10	Vaishali Ward	Anjana	Bharatiya Janata Party	
11	Fasiyapuri	Mamata Kumari	Bharatiya Janata Party	
12	Lakshmipur Patti	Abdul Qadir	Indian National Congress	
13	Tanda Ujjain West	Gunjan Prajapati	Independent	
14	Tanda Ujjain South	Prince Bali	Bharatiya Janata Party	
15	Bazpur Road	Sandeep Singh	Bharatiya Janata Party	
16	Subhash Ward	Manoj Kumar Jagga	Bharatiya Janata Party	
17	Awas Vikas Central	Pushkar Bisht	Bharatiya Janata Party	
18	Shaktinagar	Gurvinder Singh Chandok	Bharatiya Janata Party	
19	Ganj	Shivansh Goley	Independent	
20	Maheshpura Central	Rashid Hussain	Indian National Congress	
21	Maheshpura West	Husan Jahan	Independent	
22	Lakshmipur Patti Central	Afroz Jahan	Indian National Congress	
23	Allikha West	Nazma Begum	Indian National Congress	
24	Allikha Central	Mohammad Monish	Independent	
25	Allikha South	Mohammad Sharif	Independent	
26	Ojhan	Sarfaraz	Indian National Congress	
27	Singhan Kajibagh	Zeenat Bano	Indian National Congress	
28	Lahoriyan	Seema Tandon	Bharatiya Janata Party	
29	Qila	Mehraj Jahan	Independent	
30	Pakkakot	Suresh Kumar Saini	Bharatiya Janata Party	
31	Katoratal West	Arshad Ali	Independent	
32	Katoratal Central	Tabassum	Independent	
33	Patelnagar	Deepa Pathak	Independent	
34	Girital	Vijay Kumar	Bharatiya Janata Party	
35	Chamunda Vihar	Mayank Mehta	Independent	
36	Katoratal North	Shah Alam	Indian National Congress	
37	Pakkakot East	Vaishali Gupta	Bharatiya Janata Party	
38	Adarsh Ward	Ashok Kumar Saini	Bharatiya Janata Party	
39	Prabhat Colony	Anita Kamboj	Bharatiya Janata Party	
40	Kachnalgaji	Ravi Kumar	Bharatiya Janata Party	

== See also ==
- 2025 Kashipur Municipal Corporation election
