= Roorkee Municipal Corporation =

Civic body that governs the city of Roorkee in Uttarakhand, India

Roorkee Municipal Corporation रुड़की नगर निगम Roorkee Nagar Nigam
- Unicameral Legislature

Type
- Type: Municipal Corporation

Leadership
- Mayor: Anita Agarwal, BJP since 7 February 2025
- Municipal Commissioner: Rakesh Chandra Tiwari, PCS

Structure
- Seats: 40
- Political groups: Government (24): BJP (24); Opposition (16): INC (2); BSP (1); IND (13)

Elections
- Voting system: First-past-the-post
- Last election: 23 January 2025
- Next election: 2030

Meeting place
- Nagar Nigam Bhavan, Roorkee

Website
- Nagar Nigam Roorkee

The Roorkee Municipal Corporation is the civic body that governs the city of Roorkee in Uttarakhand, India.

== Structure ==
This corporation consists of 40 wards and is headed by a mayor who presides over a deputy mayor and 39 other corporators representing the wards. The mayor is elected directly through a first-past-the-post voting system and the deputy mayor is elected by the corporators from among their numbers.

== List of mayors ==
S. No.	Name	Term			Party
1	Yashpal Rana	3 May 2013	3 May 2018	5 years, 0 days	Independent
Administrator		3 May 2018	2 December 2019	1 year, 212 days	Government of Uttarakhand
2	Gaurav Goel	3 December 2019	30 July 2023	3 years, 241 days	Independent
Administrator		10 August, 2023	6 February 2025	1 year, 180 days	Government of Uttarakhand
3	Anita Agarwal	7 February 2025	Incumbent	1 year, 247 days	Bharatiya Janata Party

== Current members ==
Mayor: Anita Agarwal
Ward No	Ward Name	Name of Corporator	Party	Remarks
1	Sherpur	Sonia Devi	BSP	
2	Adarsh Nagar	Sachin Kumar	BJP	
3	Solanipuram	Devki Joshi	BJP	
4	Khanjarpur	Babita	IND	
5	CBRI	Preeti Bhardwaj	BJP	
6	IIT Roorkee	Rajan Goyal	BJP	
7	Civil Lines Central	Akash Jain	BJP	
8	Jadugar Road	Satveer Singh	BJP	
9	Northern Mohanpura	Pratibha Pal	BJP	
10	Southern Mohanpura	Pramod Pal	IND	
11	Defence Colony	Kulbir	IND	
12	Asaf Nagar Roorkee	Sachin Chaudhary	IND	
13	Civil Lines South	Navneet Sharma	BJP	
14	Preet Vihar	Anurag Tyagi	BJP	
15	Purwawali	Neetu Sharma	BJP	
16	Southern Ganeshpur	Ankit Chaudhary	IND	
17	Sheikhpuri	Sanjeev Tomar	BJP	
18	Northern Ganeshpur	Kuldeep Tomar	BJP	
19	Shivpuram	Veera Devi	BJP	
20	Chavmandi	Rishu Verma	BJP	
21	Subhash Nagar	Yajur Prajapati	BJP	
22	Krishna Nagar	Alka Saini	BJP	
23	Salempur Rajputana	Sarita	IND	
24	Salempur Industrial Centre	Sapna Dhariwal	BJP	
25	Ramnagar	Pankaj Satija	BJP	
26	Awas Vikas	Rakesh Garg	BJP	
27	Maktulpuri	Vibha Saini	BJP	
28	Deendayal East	Tahir	IND	
29	Saket	Dheeraj Pal	BJP	
30	Ambar Talab West	Charu Chandra	INC	
31	Ambar Talab East	Seema Verma	BJP	
32	World Bank Colony	Shivam Agarwal	BJP	
33	Sot	Sanjeev Rai	BJP	
34	Sati	Fazul Rahman	IND	
35	Mahigran	Mahzabi	INC	
36	Bharat Nagar	Shahnaz	IND	
37	Purani Tehsil	Nitin Tyagi	IND	
38	Sunehra	Manish Baller	IND	Expelled from BJP
39	Kashipuri	Mohammad Muntazir	IND	
40	Matlabpur	Manoj Kumar	IND	

== See also ==
- 2019 Roorkee Municipal Corporation election
- 2025 Roorkee Municipal Corporation election
