= Bajpur =

Bazpur
- Town
- Location in Uttarakhand, India Bazpur (India)
- Coordinates: 29.17°N 79.16°E
- Country: India
- State: Uttarakhand
- District: Udham Singh Nagar
- Established: 1920
- Founder: Shri Banta Ram
- Named for: Raja Baz Bahadur Chand

Population (2011)
  - Total: 22,255

Languages
  - Official: Hindi
  - Native: Khariboli
- Time zone: UTC+5:30 (IST)
- Postal code: 262401
- Vehicle registration: UK

Bazpur, or Bajpur, is a city and a municipality in Udham Singh Nagar district in the state of Uttarakhand, India.

Bazpur is well connected with the industrial city of Rudrapur and the historical city of Kashipur. Bazpur is nearest city to Nainital. It is an affluent town, mainly due to large agricultural estates. It was initially, like most of the area which forms present day Udham Singh Nagar District, a part of the Terai, and was gradually transformed into arable land by migrants from Punjab. Most of the early settlers were those rendered homeless by the Partition of India in 1947.

India's first co-operative sugar mill went into production in Bazpur on 16 February 1959.

== History ==
Bazpur was established in early in the 17th century, by Chand king Lakshmi Chand (1597–1621), and named after a former Rajput dynasty Chand king, Baz Bahadur. Later, when Bazpur was fully jungle area the people of Punjab who were rendered homeless due to the partition of India and Pakistan founded this area and transformed it into arable land and founder was Shri Banta Ram who own more than half of the land of Bazpur legally. He also gave some other people land from free of cost to live who were rendering homeless in the area in that time.

Bazpur is the location of the first co-operative sugar mill in India, which was dedicated to the nation by Jawahar Lal Nehru. It was the first effort of establishment of a sugar factory in the co-operative sector, which went into production on 16 February 1959.

== Demographics ==
As of the 2001 census of India, Bazpur had a population of 21,782. Males constituted 55% of the population and females 45%. Bazpur had an average literacy rate of 66%, higher than the national average of 59.5%, with 60% of the males and 40% of females literate. 14% of the population were under 6 years of age.

== Education ==
Schools in the region include:

- Riverdale International
- St Nila Carmel School
- St Mary's School
- Sri Dashmesh School
- Genius Global Academy
- Gyandeep Global School
- D.A.V Public School

A new state government college of nursing opened in October 2024 behind the Shri Dashmesh School, offering a course of Basic B.Sc. Nursing under affiliation of HNB Medical University.

== Nearby places of interest ==
- Jim Corbett National Park
- Kashipur
- Moradabad
- New Delhi
- Nainital
- Rampur
- Haldwani
