= Chamba, Uttarakhand =

- Town
- Location in Uttarakhand, India Chamba, Uttarakhand (India)
- Coordinates: 30.21°N 78.23°E
- Country: India
- State: Uttarakhand
- District: Tehri Garhwal

Area
  - Total: 4 km^{2} (1.5 sq mi)
- Elevation: 1,524 m (5,000 ft)

Population (2011)
  - Total: 7,771
  - Density: 1,900/km^{2} (5,000/sq mi)

Languages
  - Official: Hindi, Sanskrit
  - Native: Garhwali
- Time zone: UTC+5:30 (IST)
- PIN: 249145
- Telephone code: 01376
- Vehicle registration: UK 09
- Website: uk.gov.in

Chamba is a town and a hill station, nearby New Tehri City in Tehri Garhwal district in the state of Uttarakhand, India. It is situated at a junction of roads connecting Mussoorie and Rishikesh with the Tehri Dam reservoir and New Tehri. The town is about 50 km from Mussoorie and also near Dhanaulti, Surkanda Devi Temple, Ranichauri, New Tehri, and Kanatal, tipri halfway between Chamba and Dhanaulti.Chamba is situated at an altitude of 1600m above sea level. One can reach Chamba in about 7-8 hrs from Delhi via Haridwar, Rishikesh and Narendranagar (290 km).

== Demographics ==
As of 2011 India census, Chamba is a Nagar Palika city in the district of Tehri Garhwal, Uttarakhand. The Chamba city is divided into seven wards for which elections are held every 5 years. The Chamba Nagar Palika has population of 7,771, of which 4,149 are males while 3,622 are females as per report released by Census India 2011.

Population of Children with age of 0-6 is 1010 which is 13.00% of the total population of Chamba (NPP). In Chamba Nagar Palika, Female Sex Ratio is of 873 against state average of 963. Moreover, the child sex ratio in Chamba is around 857 compared to the Uttarakhand state average of 890. Literacy rate of Chamba city is 89.04% higher than state average of 79.82%. In Chamba, the male literacy rate is around 91.71%, while female literacy rate is 85.99%.

Chamba Nagar Palika has a total administration over 1,971 houses to which it supplies basic amenities like water and sewerage. It is also authorized to build roads within Nagar Palika limits and impose taxes on properties coming under its jurisdiction.

- Caste Factor

Schedule Caste (SC) constitutes 7.73% while Schedule Tribe (ST) were 0.59% of total population in Chamba (NPP).

- Work Profile

Out of the total population, 2,517 were engaged in work or business activity. Of this 2,085 were males while 432 were females. In census survey, a worker is defined as a person who does business, job, service, and cultivator and labour activity. Of total 2517 working population, 85.78% were engaged in Main Work while 14.22% of total workers were engaged in Marginal Work.

== World War 1 and Chamba ==
The Chamba area, and indeed, most of Uttarakhand, has rendered in the past deep historical sacrifices during World War I. The village Manjud was one of the villages of South Asia to produce the most soldiers and volunteers, about 480 who joined various army regiments and served in various theatres of war between 1914-1918 It is also worth noting that the famous Victoria Cross recipient, Rifleman Gabbar Singh Negi, also belonged to this area, and an annual fair is still held in Chamba at 21st of April each year to commemorate Negi's great and gallant sacrifice as a young man of barely 19 or 20 years. This annual fair and festival is widely attended by many people and is a major tourist attraction.

== See also ==
- Kanatal
