= New Tehri =

- City
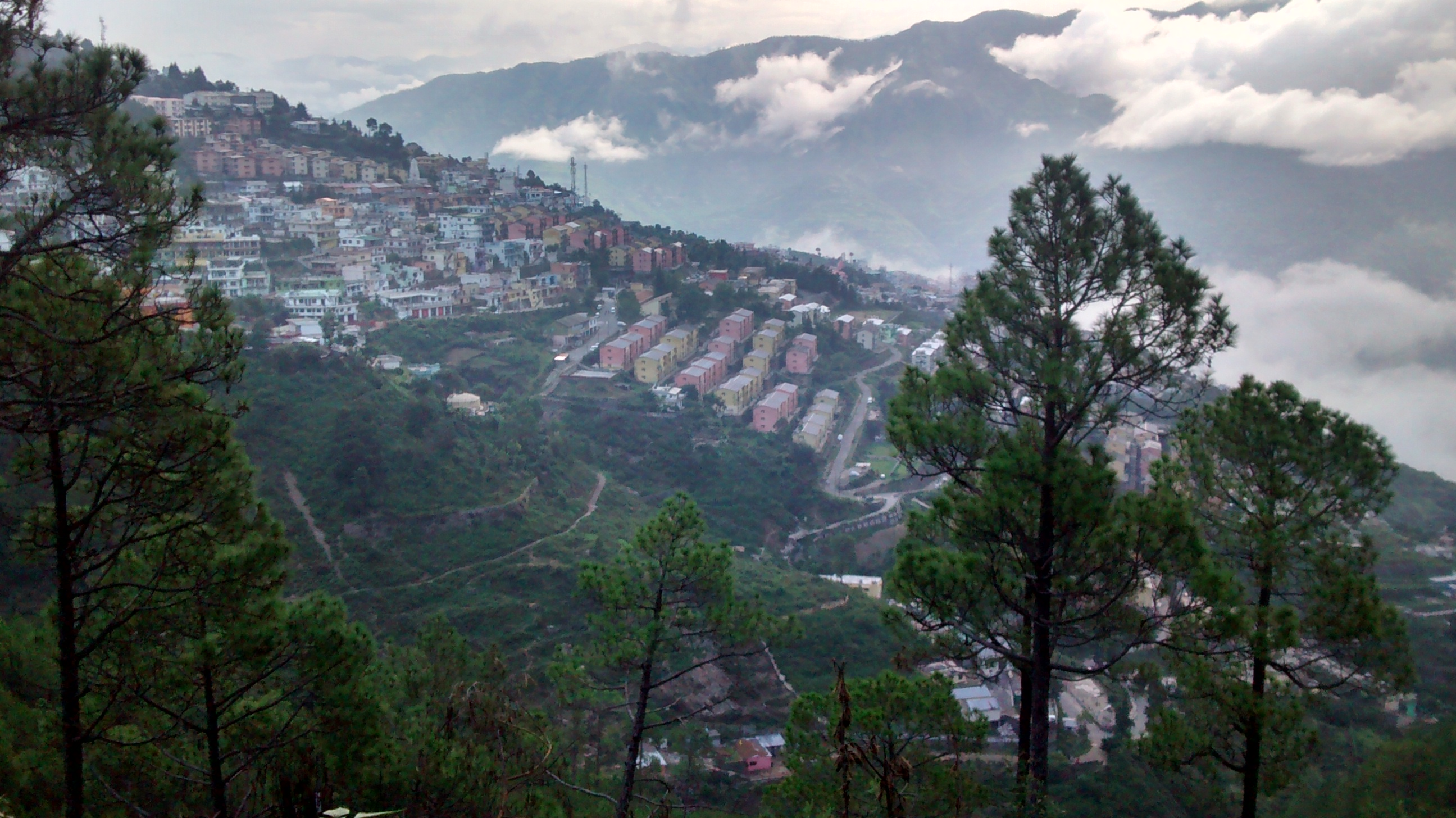
- New Tehri city view

- Location in Uttarakhand, India New Tehri (India)
- Coordinates: 30°22′37.173″N 78°26′14.642″E
- Country: India
- State: Uttarakhand
- District: Tehri Garhwal
- Founder: King Sudarshan Shah (New Tehri by THDC)

Government
  - Type: Municipal
  - Body: New Tehri Nagar Palika (Chairperson-Mr. Mohan Singh Rawat, Independent), 2025/01/25-present
- Elevation: 1,750 m (5,740 ft)

Population (2011)
  - Total: 24,014

Languages
  - Official: Hindi, Sanskrit
  - Native: Garhwali
  - Literacy: 90.55%
- Time zone: UTC+5:30 (IST)
- Postal code: 249001
- Telephone code: 01376
- Vehicle registration: UK-09
- Website: http://tehri.nic.in/

New Tehri is a city and a municipal board in Tehri Garhwal district in the Indian state of Uttarakhand. It is the administrative headquarters of Tehri Garhwal District. New Tehri's urban municipality area has 9 wards.

Mohan Singh Rawat is the current chairperson of Nagar Palika Tehri. He won as an independent. Tehri is represented by the Tehri assembly seat of Uttarakhand and the Tehri Lok Sabha seat of India, which are represented by Kishore Upadhyaya (Bhartiya Janta Party) and Mala Rajya Laxmi Shah (Bhartiya Janta Party) respectively.

== History ==
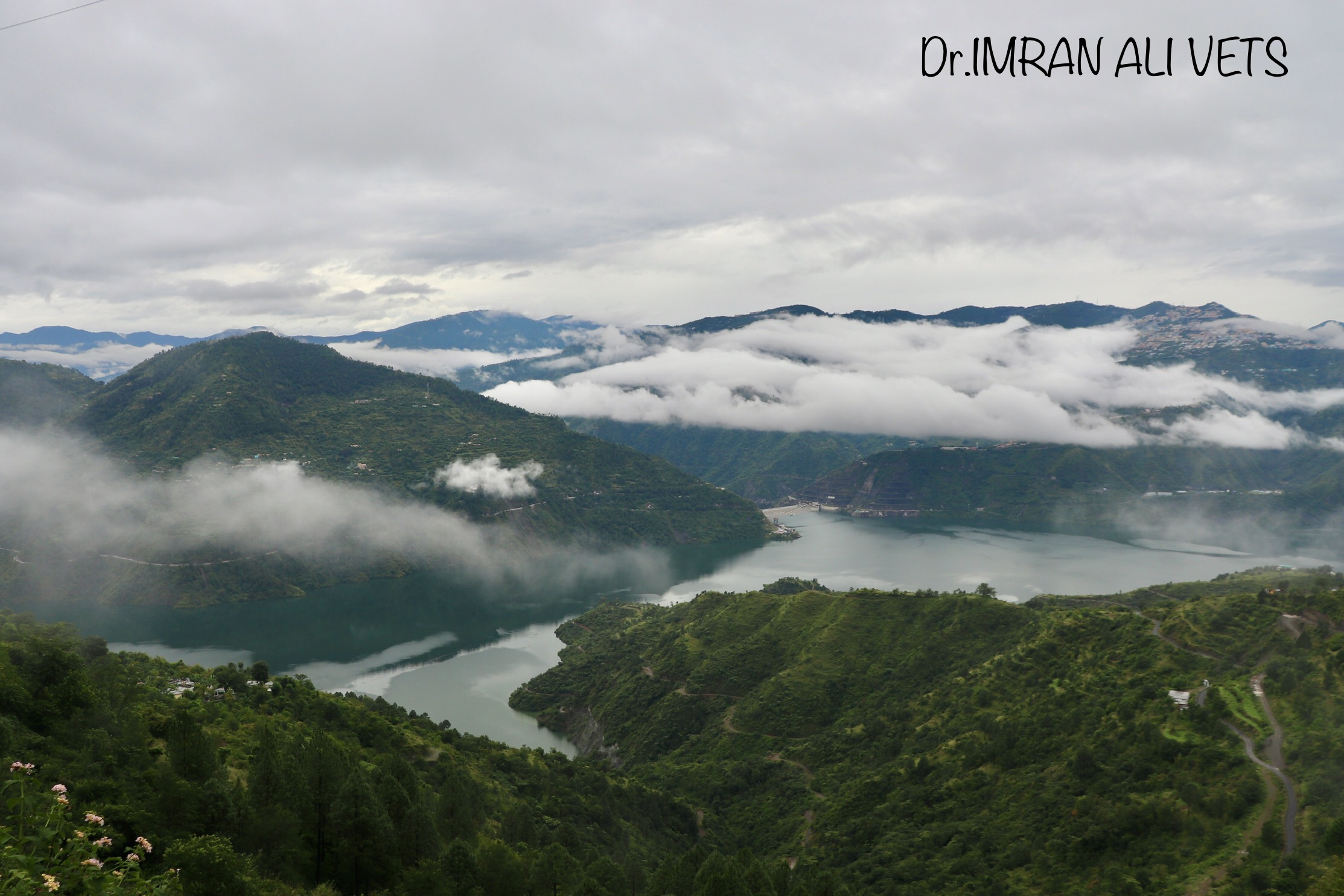
Lake created By Tehri Dam on river Bhagirathi

The old town of Tehri sat at the confluence of the Bhagirathi and Bhilangna rivers. It was formerly known as Ganeshprayag. It adjoined the district of Garhwal, and its topographical features were similar. It contained the sources of both the Ganges and the Yamuna, which are visited by thousands of Hindu pilgrims.

Construction of the Tehri Dam totally submerged the old town of Tehri, and the population was shifted to the town of New Tehri.

The town is famous for being the site of the protests against the dam by Sundarlal Bahuguna and his followers during the Chipko movement.

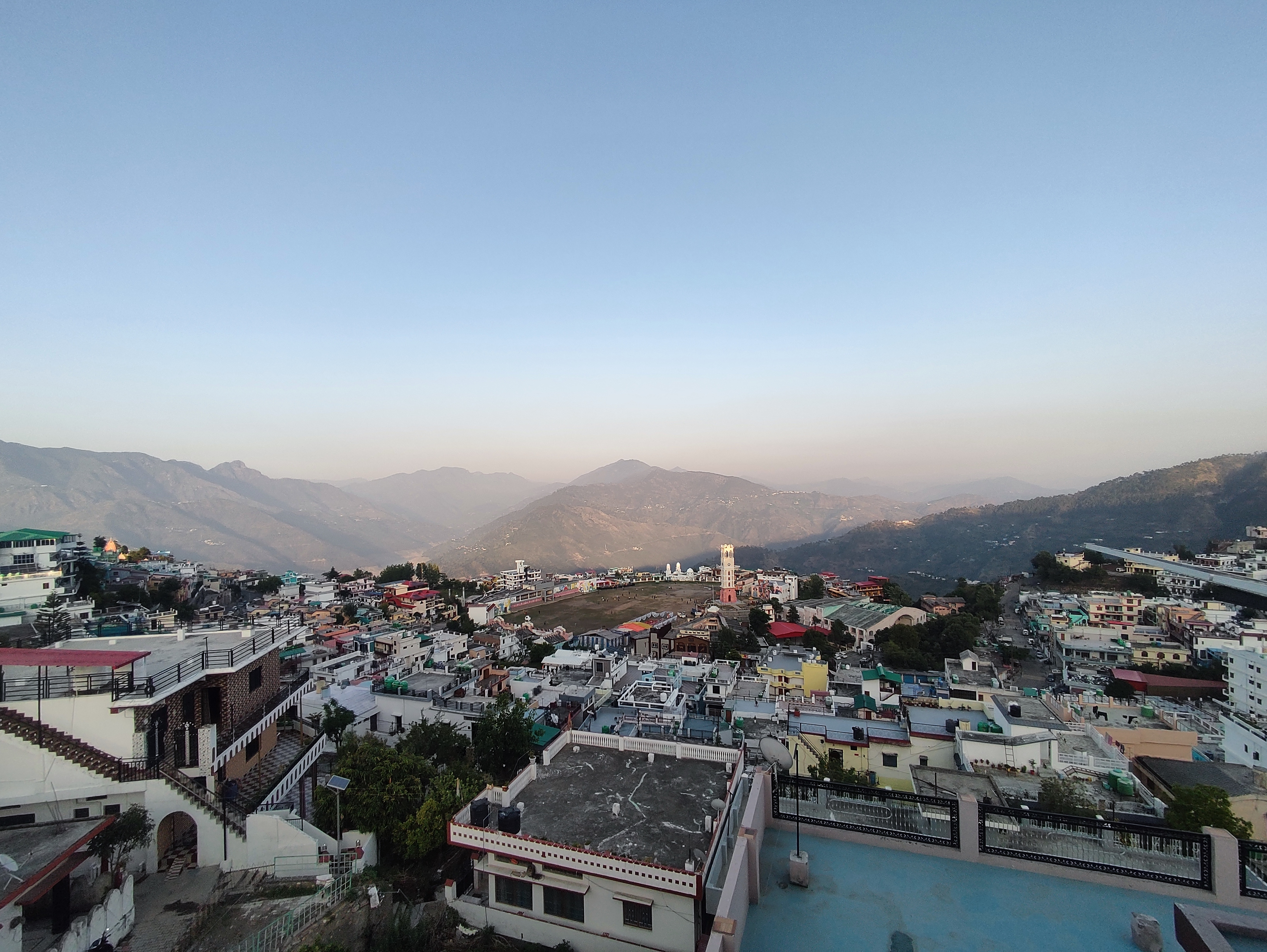
View of New Tehri Town in Tehri District in Uttarakhand.

== Climate ==
Climate data for Tehri (1991–2020)
Month	Jan	Feb	Mar	Apr	May	Jun	Jul	Aug	Sep	Oct	Nov	Dec	Year
Record high °C (°F)	25.6 (78.1)	30.6 (87.1)	36.7 (98.1)	41.0 (105.8)	42.5 (108.5)	43.8 (110.8)	40.2 (104.4)	37.2 (99.0)	37.1 (98.8)	36.7 (98.1)	31.7 (89.1)	29.7 (85.5)	43.8 (110.8)
Mean daily maximum °C (°F)	15.1 (59.2)	16.5 (61.7)	21.6 (70.9)	25.3 (77.5)	27.6 (81.7)	28.2 (82.8)	26.0 (78.8)	25.9 (78.6)	25.7 (78.3)	23.5 (74.3)	20.0 (68.0)	17.1 (62.8)	22.6 (72.7)
Mean daily minimum °C (°F)	3.5 (38.3)	5.2 (41.4)	9.1 (48.4)	12.5 (54.5)	15.1 (59.2)	17.7 (63.9)	18.5 (65.3)	18.5 (65.3)	16.6 (61.9)	11.5 (52.7)	7.3 (45.1)	4.5 (40.1)	11.5 (52.7)
Record low °C (°F)	−2.4 (27.7)	−3.8 (25.2)	−0.3 (31.5)	3.8 (38.8)	7.0 (44.6)	10.2 (50.4)	12.8 (55.0)	14.6 (58.3)	11.2 (52.2)	5.3 (41.5)	1.6 (34.9)	−1.5 (29.3)	−3.8 (25.2)
Average rainfall mm (inches)	50.9 (2.00)	82.9 (3.26)	60.1 (2.37)	45.1 (1.78)	54.6 (2.15)	119.8 (4.72)	271.5 (10.69)	226.5 (8.92)	117.1 (4.61)	19.6 (0.77)	6.2 (0.24)	19.8 (0.78)	1,074 (42.28)
Average rainy days	3.9	4.8	3.9	4.0	5.0	5.6	12.8	12.3	5.3	1.3	0.8	1.6	61.3
Average relative humidity (%) (at 17:30 IST)	57	57	49	40	42	55	74	78	73	62	60	57	59
Source: India Meteorological Department

== Demographics ==
As of 2011 India census, Tehri had a population of 24,014. Males constitute 65% of the population and females 35%. The total literacy rate of Tehri was 90.55% in 2011 which is greater than the average literacy rate of 78.82% of Uttarakhand. Population-wise, out of total 19,496 literates, males were 11,260 while females were 8,236. Also the male literacy rate was 95.28% and the female literacy rate was 84.79% in Tehri.. In Tehri, 10% of the population is under 6 years of age.

== Notable sites ==
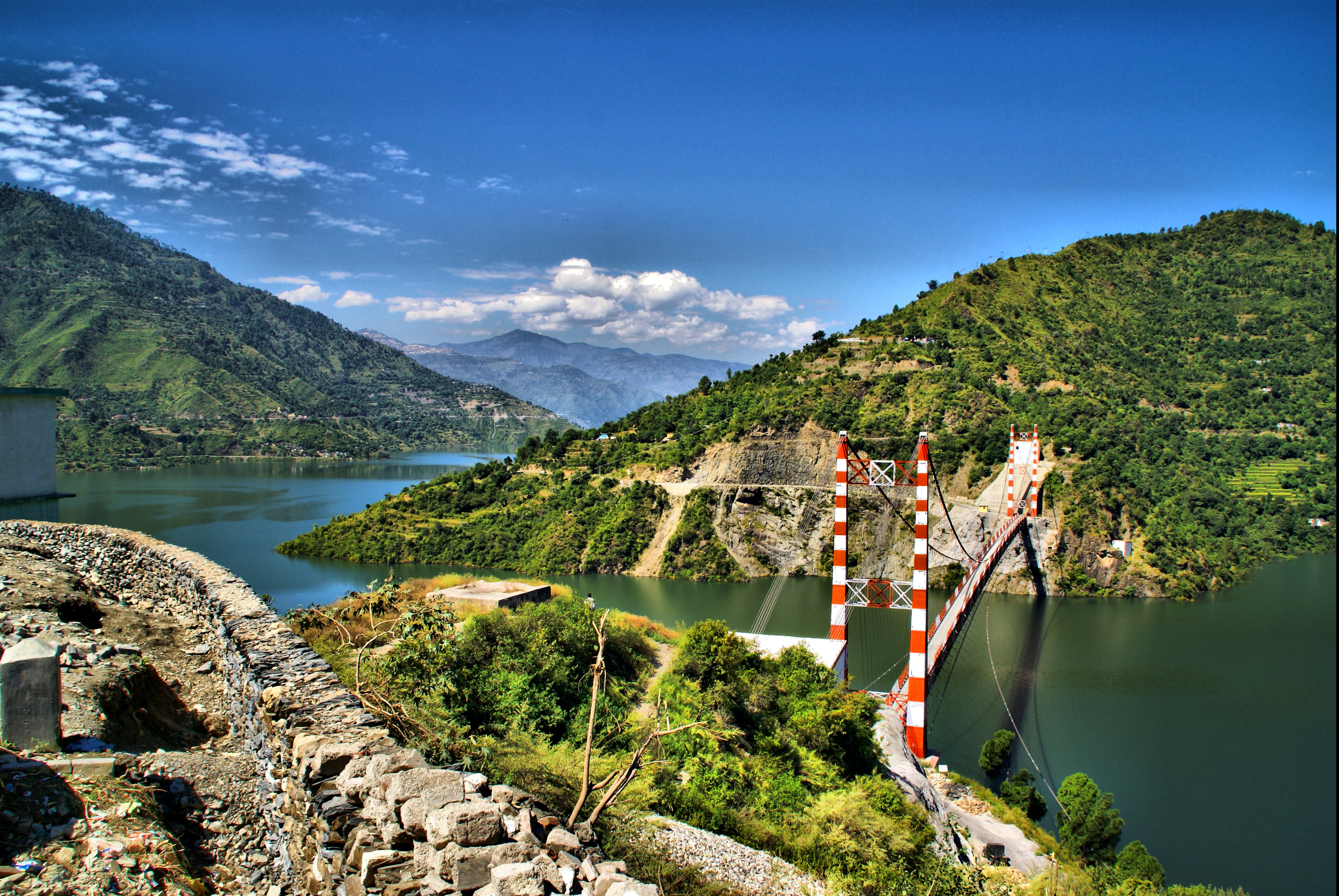
Tehri lake the most popular tourist site

A notable temple in the town is Chandrabadani Devi. The Khatling Glacier is close by.

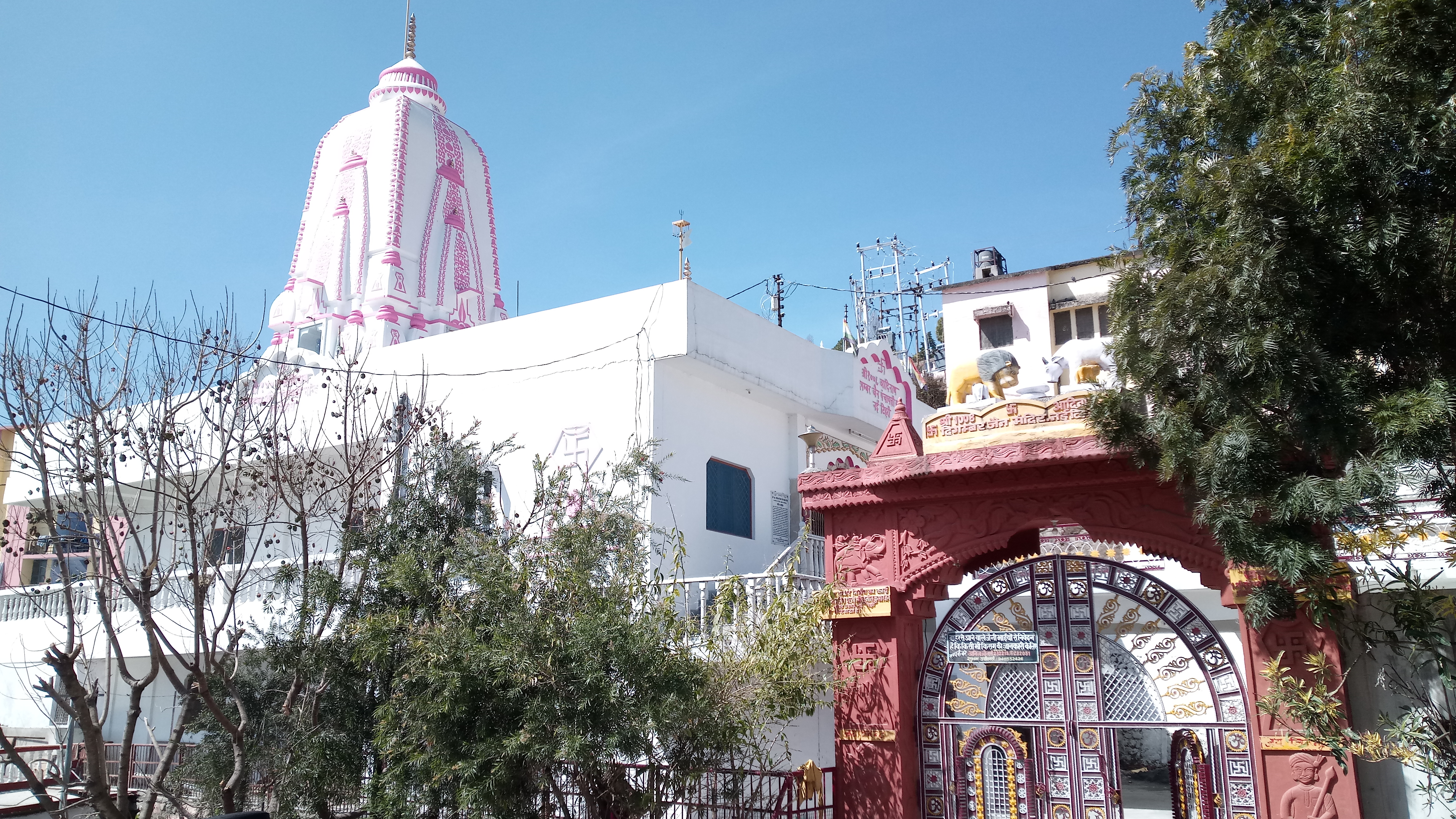
Shri Aadinath Digamber Jain Mandir, New Tehri, Uttarakhand

Notable sites	Sea Level in Meters	Nearby Town	Tracking Route (distance from road)
Chandravadni	2756	Devprayag	1.5 km
Kanatal	2590	Kaddukhal	9 km
Khait Parvat	3030	Ghansali, Ghonti	8.5 km
Khatling Glacier	3717	Ghuttu	45 km
Dobra Chanti Bridge	850	Dobra	250 meter
Kunjapuri	1645	Narendra Nagar	200 meters
Maithiyana Devi	2500	Tilwara, Bhardar	9 km
Panwali Kantha	3963	Ghuttu	15 km
Sahastra Tal	4572	Ghuttu, Rih	32 km
Surkanda Devi	2757	Dhanaulti	1.5 km
Mauriyana Top	2050	Chinyali Saur, Suwakholi and Mussoorie	30 km, 35 km and 80 km

== Transport ==
=== By road ===
The major highway that links New Tehri is National Highway 34. It connects to major Uttarakhand cities Dehradun and Rishikesh. It is 99 km from Dehradun and 75 km from Rishikesh. A daily Uttarakhand Transport Corporation bus service connects the town to Dehradun.

=== By train ===
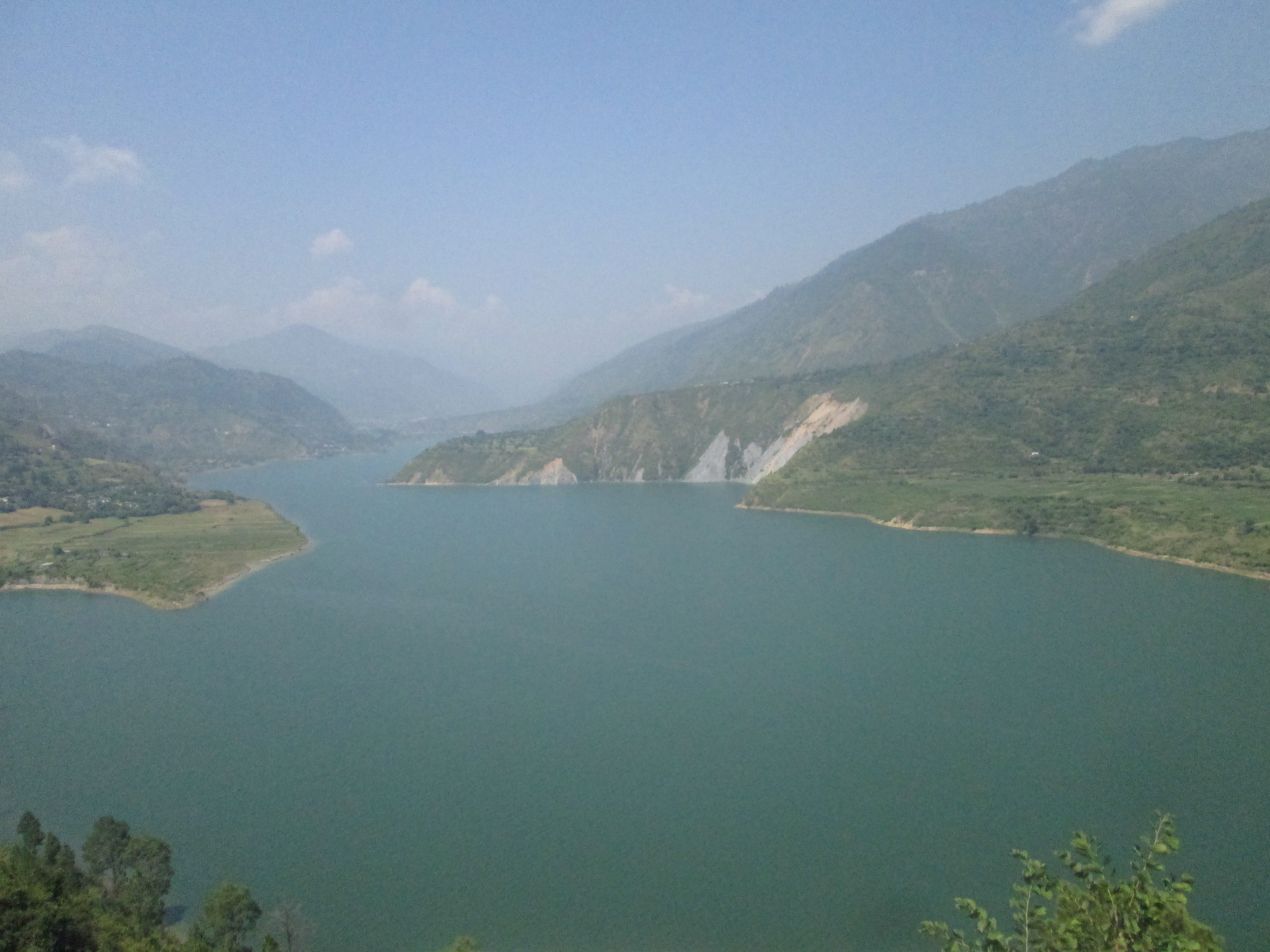
Tehri Lake/Reservoir

The nearest railway station is Rishikesh Railway Station, which is 71 km from New Tehri.

=== By air ===
The nearest airport is Dehradun Airport in Dehradun, which is 76 km from New Tehri.

== In literature ==
Letitia Elizabeth Landon's poetical illustration on Davis Cox's picture 'The Grass-Rope Bridge at Teree, in the Province of Gurwall', refers back to the time when the hill country of this province was resorted to for recuperation by Europeans suffering from the heat of the plains.

== Education ==
=== Universities ===
- Hemwati Nandan Bahuguna Garhwal University
- Sri Dev Suman Uttarakhand University

=== Colleges ===
- THDC Institute of Hydropower Engineering and Technology
