= ITEC =

ITEC is an acronym or abbreviation with several meanings:

- Indian Technical and Economic Cooperation Programme, India's foreign aid development program
- Induced thymic epithelial cell, a type of stem cell
- International Therapy Examination Council, an international examination board offering a variety of qualifications worldwide
- International Turbine Engine Corporation, a joint venture company between Honeywell and Aerospace Industrial Development Corporation
- Inter-Tribal Environmental Council, a consortium of over 40 Native American tribes in Oklahoma, New Mexico and Texas
- Into the Electric Castle, an album by progressive metal musical project Ayreon
- ITEC Kasaragod, the Information Technology Education Centre, affiliated with Kannur University, Kannur, India
- Indigenous People's Technology and Education Center, a not-for-profit organization in Dunnellon, Florida
- International Tuba Euphonium Conference
