= Narendranagar =

- Town
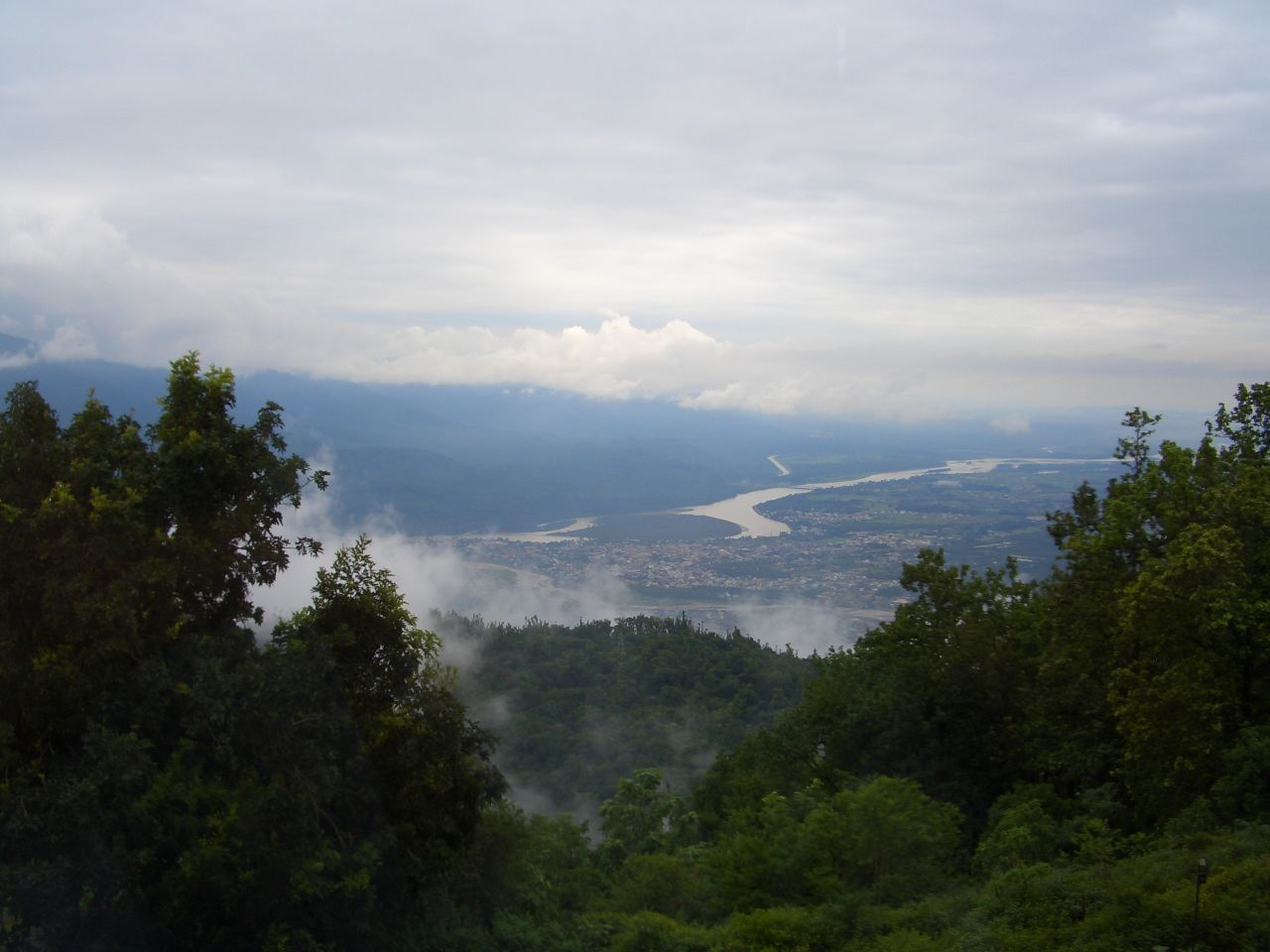
- Himalayan view from Ananda Hotel & Spa, Narendranagar

- Location in Uttarakhand, India Narendranagar (India)
- Coordinates: 30.17°N 78.30°E
- Country: India
- State: Uttarakhand
- District: Tehri Garhwal
- Elevation: 1,020 m (3,350 ft)

Population (2001)
  - Total: 3,349

Languages
  - Official: Hindi
  - Spoken: Garhwali
- Time zone: UTC+5:30 (IST)
- PIN: 249175
- Area code: +91 1378
- Vehicle registration: UK
- Website: uk.gov.in

Narendranagar is a town and a municipal board in Tehri Garhwal district in the Indian state of Uttarakhand.

== Geography ==
Narendranagar is located at 30.17°N 78.30°E. It has an average elevation of 1,020 metres (3,349 feet).

== Demographics ==
As of 2001 India census, Narendranagar had a population of 4796. Males constitute 59% of the population and females 41%. Narendranagar has an average literacy rate of 82%, higher than the national average of 59.5%: male literacy is 86%, and female literacy is 74%. In Narendranagar, 11% of the population is under 6 years of age.

== History ==
The present town of Narendranagar came into existence in 1919, when Maharaja Narendra Shah of Tehri Garhwal moved his capital from Tehri to a more picturesque locale. The small town of Odathali, nestled in the Shivalik foothills, was chosen not only for its extraordinary scenic beauty but also for its proximity to the plains below. On a clear day, one can get an aerial view of Rishikesh, Haridwar and the Ganga flowing from the mountains to the plains of Haridwar. The move mirrored earlier decisions by his predecessors—Pratap Shah and Kirti Shah—who had founded Pratapnagar and Kirtinagar, respectively

Odathali is a place of historic and mythological significance. It has been known to be a seat of spirituality and meditation since ancient times. According to legend, the sage Uddhava is known to have performed severe penance at this spot. Also, Purasara, the founder of astrology, has been known to conduct various experiments on the movements of planets and stars. His observatory has now been converted into the local polytechnic.

Some of the buildings like the hospital and the secretariat are still in use today. The bazaar buildings are a century old.

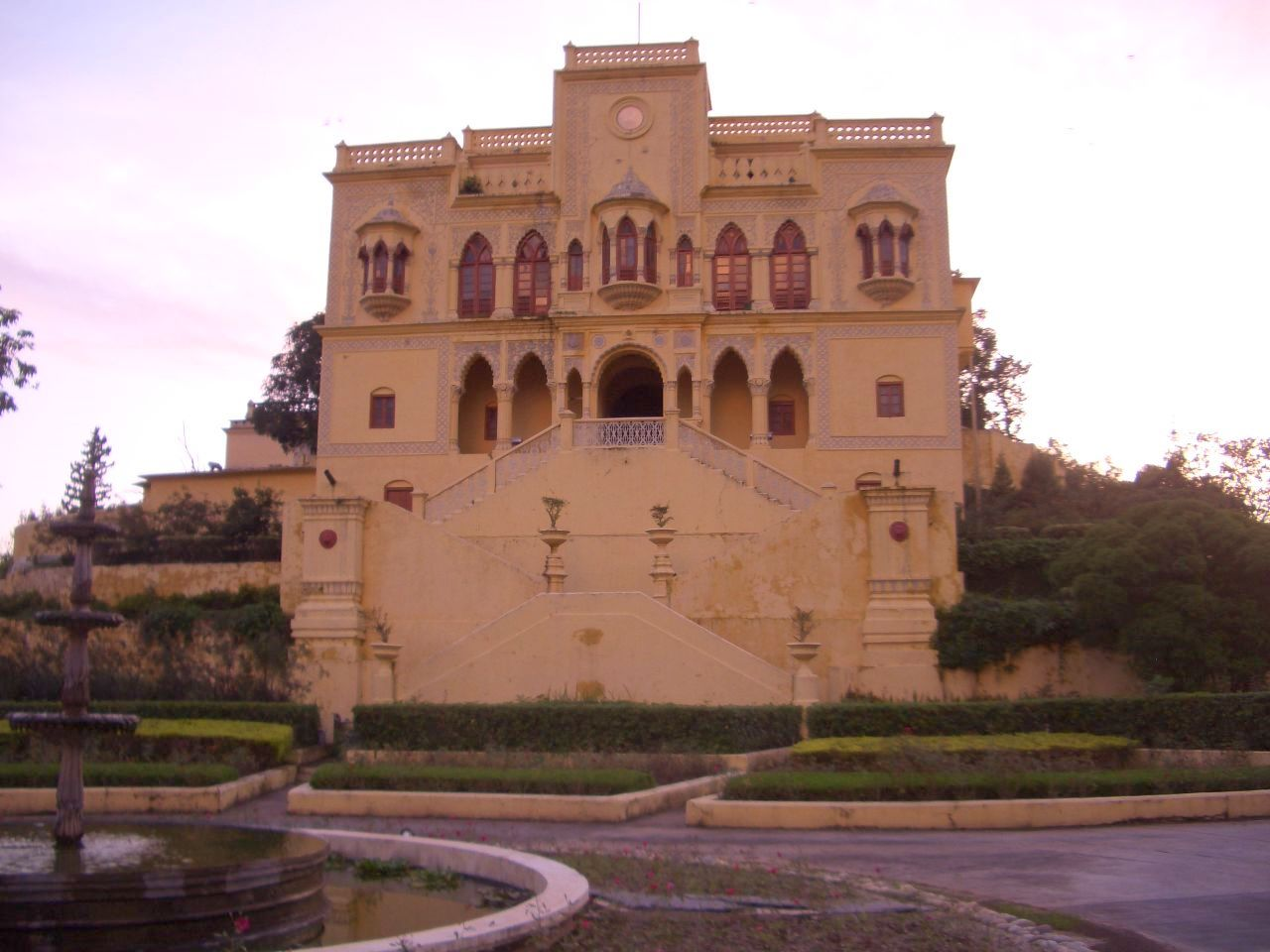
Viceregal Palace, built by the Maharaja of Tehri Garhwal, ca 1910, now Ananda - In the Himalayas

In the early 1900s, Narendra Nagar became a popular destination with the British Viceroys of the time. The Palace 'Annexe' was added to the original palace building in 1910 to house the Viceroy and his entourage who visited Narendra Nagar fairly often. Over the years, the regal corridors of the Palace has echoed with the footsteps of many distinguished guests - former Prime Ministers of India, Lal Bahadur Shastri, Indira Gandhi and spiritual leaders like Anandmayi Ma and Swami Sivanand as well as the last British Viceroy of India, Lord Mountbatten of Burma.

The last Maharaja, Manabendra Shah took over the reins of Tehri Garhwal in 1946, from Maharaja Narendra Shah, who abdicated in the favour of his son. The province was eventually merged with the state of Uttar Pradesh shortly after India gained independence.

'The Narendranagar Palace', is now home to 'Ananda - In the Himalayas', a destination spa, that looks down into the Doon Valley from its height of 3000 feet. Crowning ridge of the Himalayan ranges, the palace is a symbol of the grandeur and splendour of an era gone by. Original relief work still adorns the palace walls and two magnificent World War I cannons flank the royal gateway.
