= Dhanaulti =

Dhanaulti Dhanolti
- Hill station
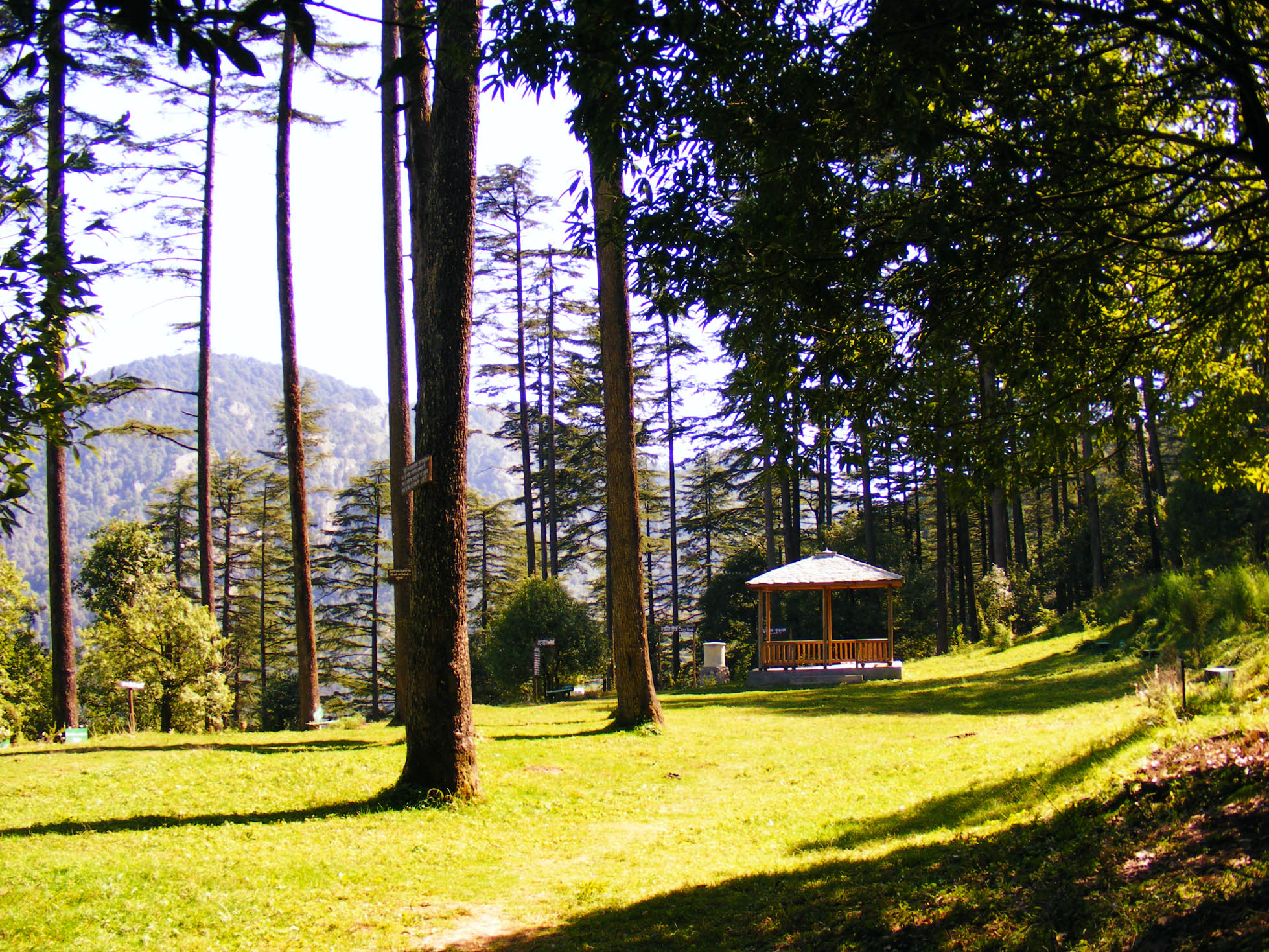

- Location in Uttarakhand, India Dhanaulti (India)
- Coordinates: 30.45°N 78.25°E
- Country: India
- State: Uttarakhand
- District: Tehri Garhwal
- Elevation: 2,286 m (7,500 ft)

Population
  - Total: 1,021

Languages
  - Official: Hindi
  - Native: Jaunpuri
- Time zone: UTC+5:30 (IST)
- Postal code: 249180
- Telephone code: 91-1376
- Vehicle registration: UK 09
- Website: uk.gov.in

Dhanaulti is a hill station and tehsil in Tehri Garhwal district, Uttarakhand, India. It is situated at an elevation of 2286 meters above sea level.

Situated in the foothills of the Garhwal Himalayas, the town is 40 km (25 mi) from New Tehri, the district headquarters. It is located on the Mussoorie-Chamba route, Dhanaulti is 24 kms from Mussoorie and 29 Kms from Chamba.

Dhanaulti is located on the important tourist circuit of Landour, Mussoorie, Kanatal, Chamba and New Tehri.

== Climate ==
The summer temperatures in the town, range from 20 °C to 25 °C, while winter temperatures remain between 7 °C and -1 °C.

== Notable sites ==
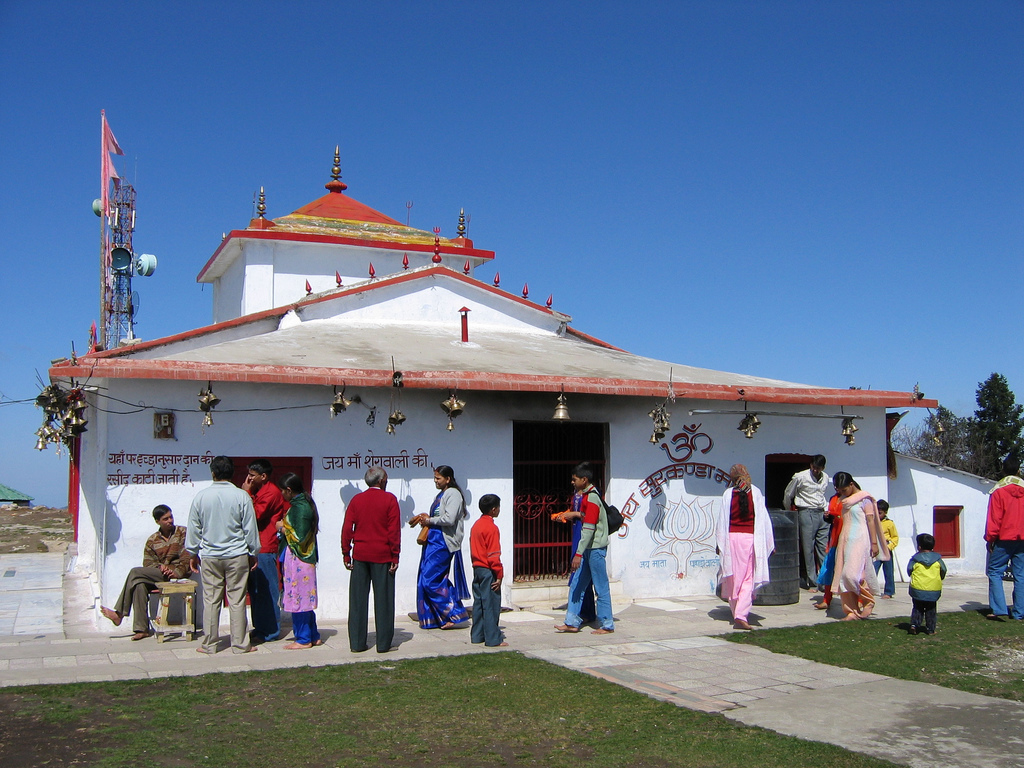
Surkanda Devi temple

Dhanaulti includes an area with two eco-parks, "Amber" and "Dhara", about 200 m apart.

Surkanda Devi is a notable Hindu temple.

== Transport ==
It is 325 km (202 mi) from Delhi, an 8-9 hrs drive away. The nearest airport is Jolly Grant Airport 82 km (51 mi) away, near Dehradun, and nearest railway head is at Dehradun, 74 km (46 mi) away.

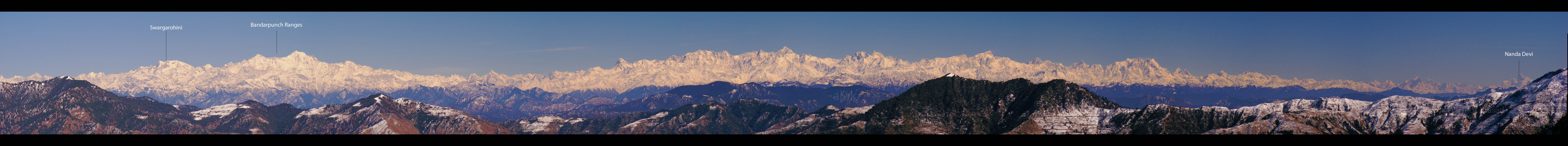
A panorama of Garhwal Himalaya from Dhanaulti

== Gallery ==
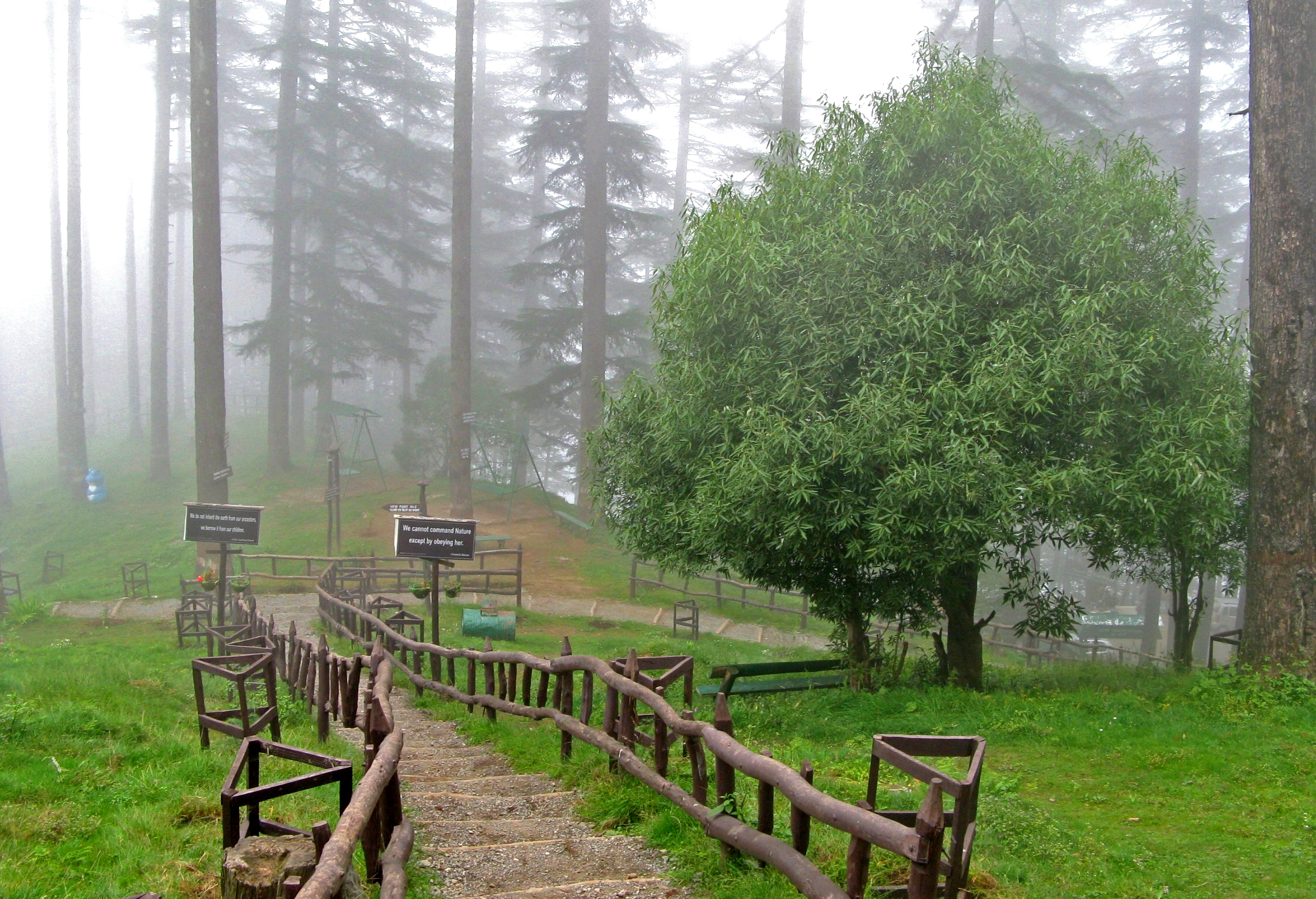
Dhanaulti Eco park

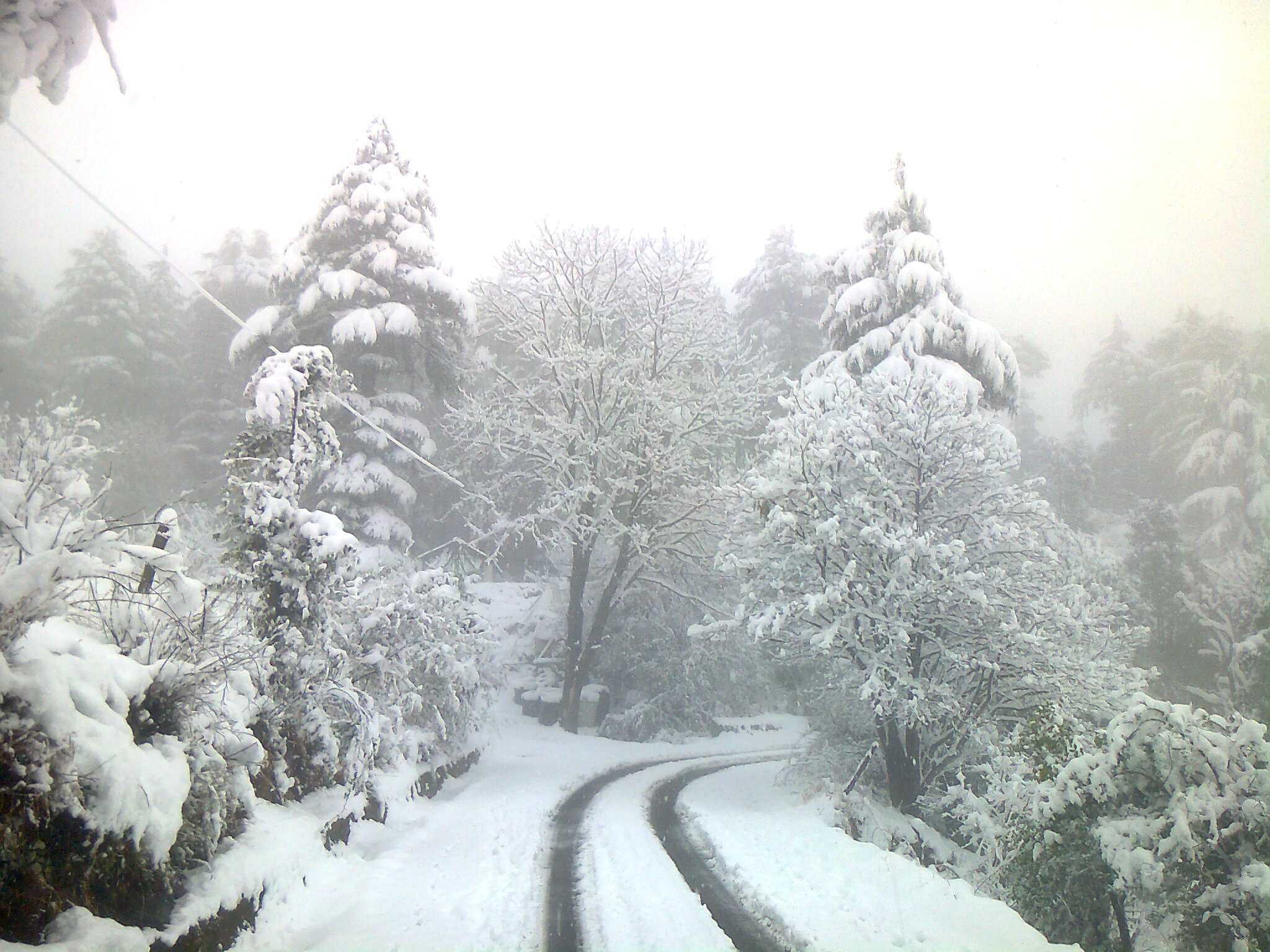
A road covered with snow in Dhanaulti

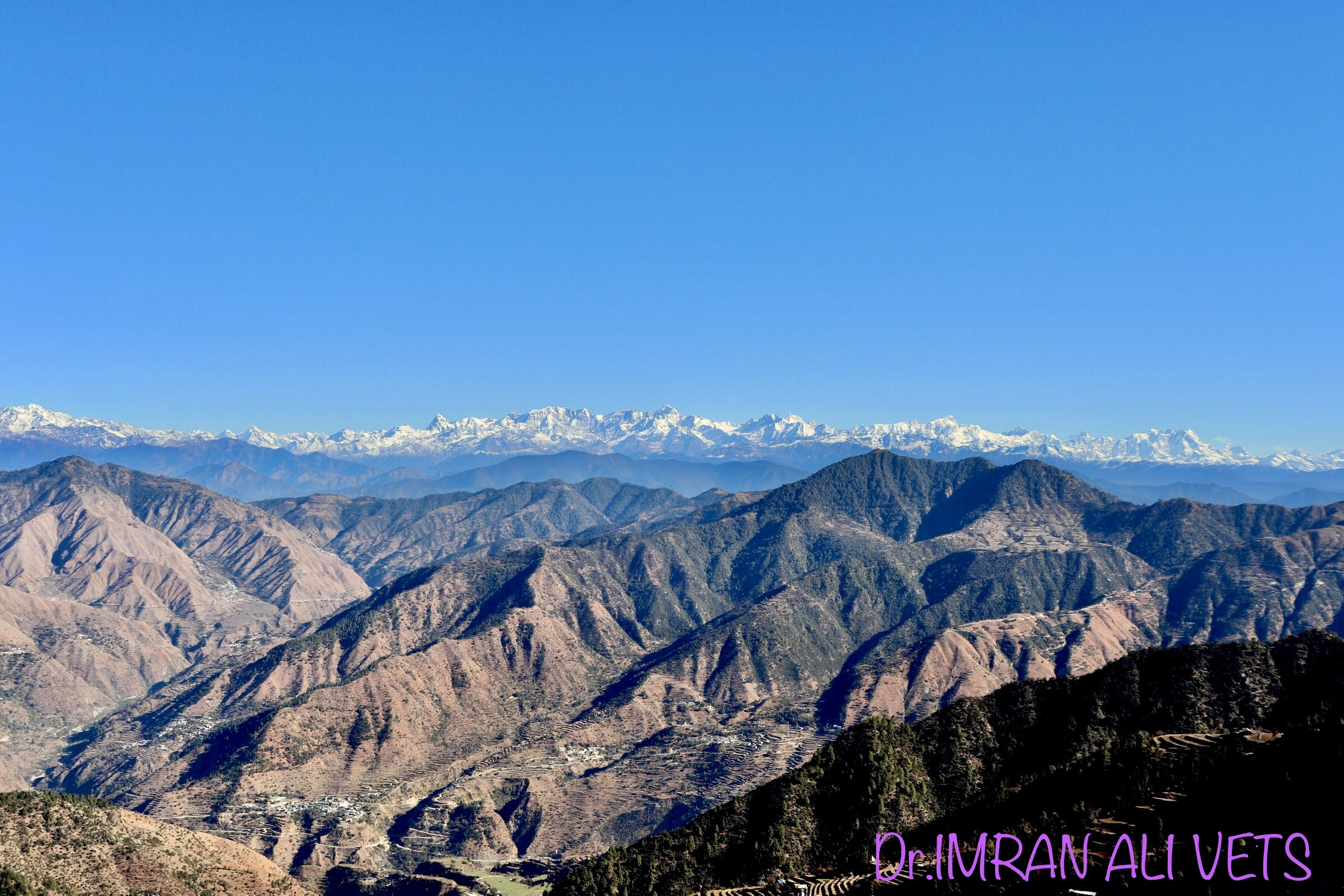
Himalayan range visible from Dehradun-Dhanaulti road.

== See also ==
- Landour
- Mussoorie
- New Tehri
- Kanatal
- Chamba
- Tehri Dam
- Surkanda Devi
