= Mathesari =

Mathisari is an Indian, Uniyal village situated near Jaled and Bangoli, located in the Tehri Garhwal district of Uttarakhand. It is the site of the Devi Rajrajeshwari Temple. According to the 2011 census of India, its population is 107 on here a 6th to 12th level school which name is Gic Khankari and Mr Girish prasad Uniyal was taught there but nowadays days they are teaching in Gic Nakot as a lecturer Sanskrit Mr.Ramesh Uniyal is Gram Prashanth of there.
