= Ananda in the Himalayas =

Building in India

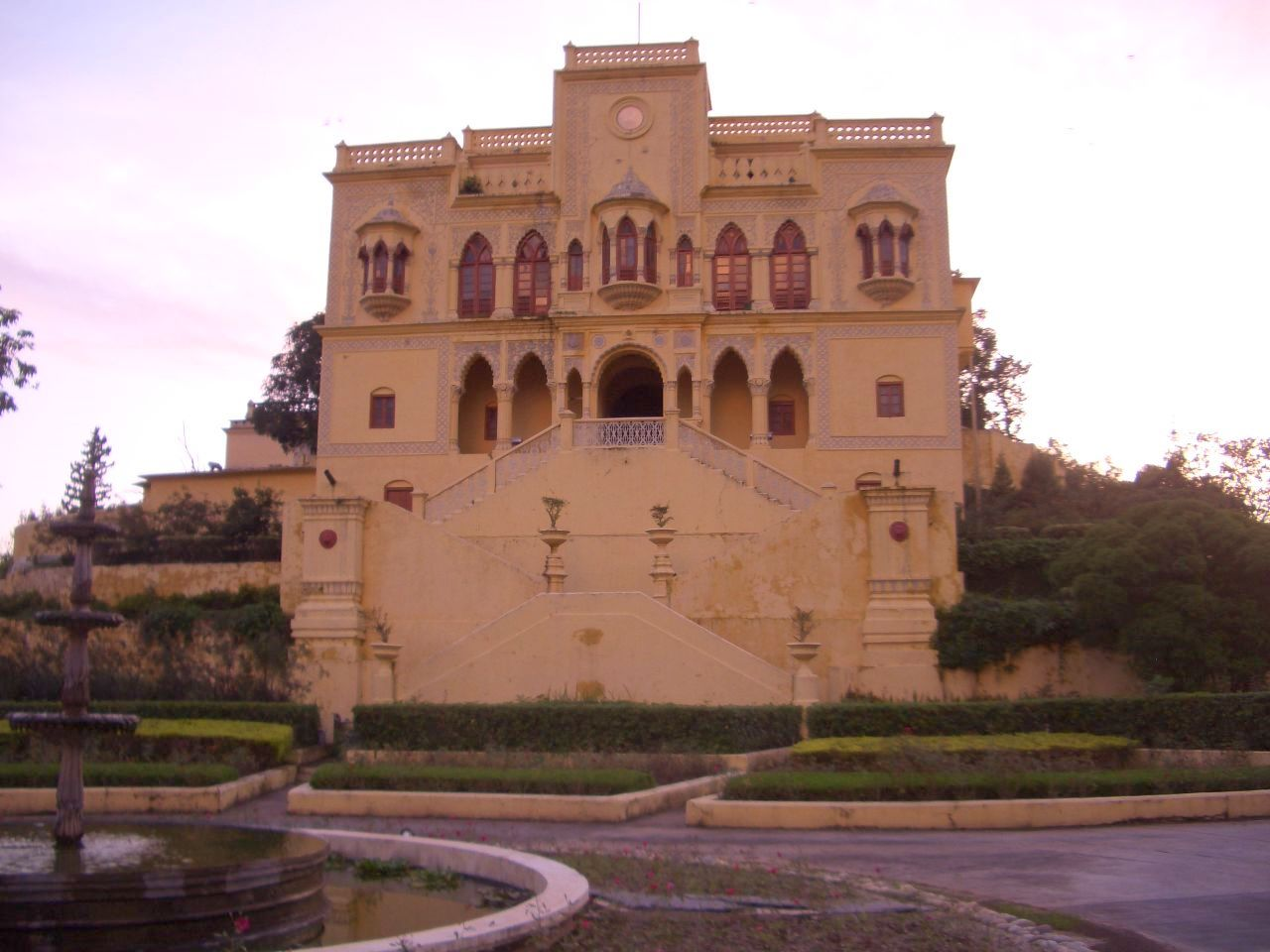
- Viceregal Palace

General information
- Location: Narendra Nagar, Uttarakhand, India
- Opening: 2000
- Owner: IHHR Hospitality Pvt. Ltd.

Website
- http://www.anandaspa.com

Ananda in the Himalayas is a luxury destination spa in Narendra Nagar, Uttarakhand, set in the Indian Himalayas.

It is located in a 100-acre (40 ha) estate surrounded by sal forests, near the river Ganges, close to the towns of Rishikesh and Muni Ki Reti, it was established in 2000, and was India's first destination spa. Ananda focusses on Yoga and Ayurveda practices, combined with international spa therapies. The property includes the royal palace of Narendra Nagar, of the Maharaja of Tehri Garhwal, the restored Viceregal Palace was built in 1910–11 by the Maharaja for an expected visit of the Viceroy of India. Though the visit never materialized, the edifice remains, and went to accommodate the likes of Lord Mountbatten of Burma, a later Viceroy of India.

In 2003 and 2007 it was considered one of the best spas in the world by The Telegraph and rated No. 1 destination spa in the world by Travel + Leisure magazine in 2008.

== Etymology ==
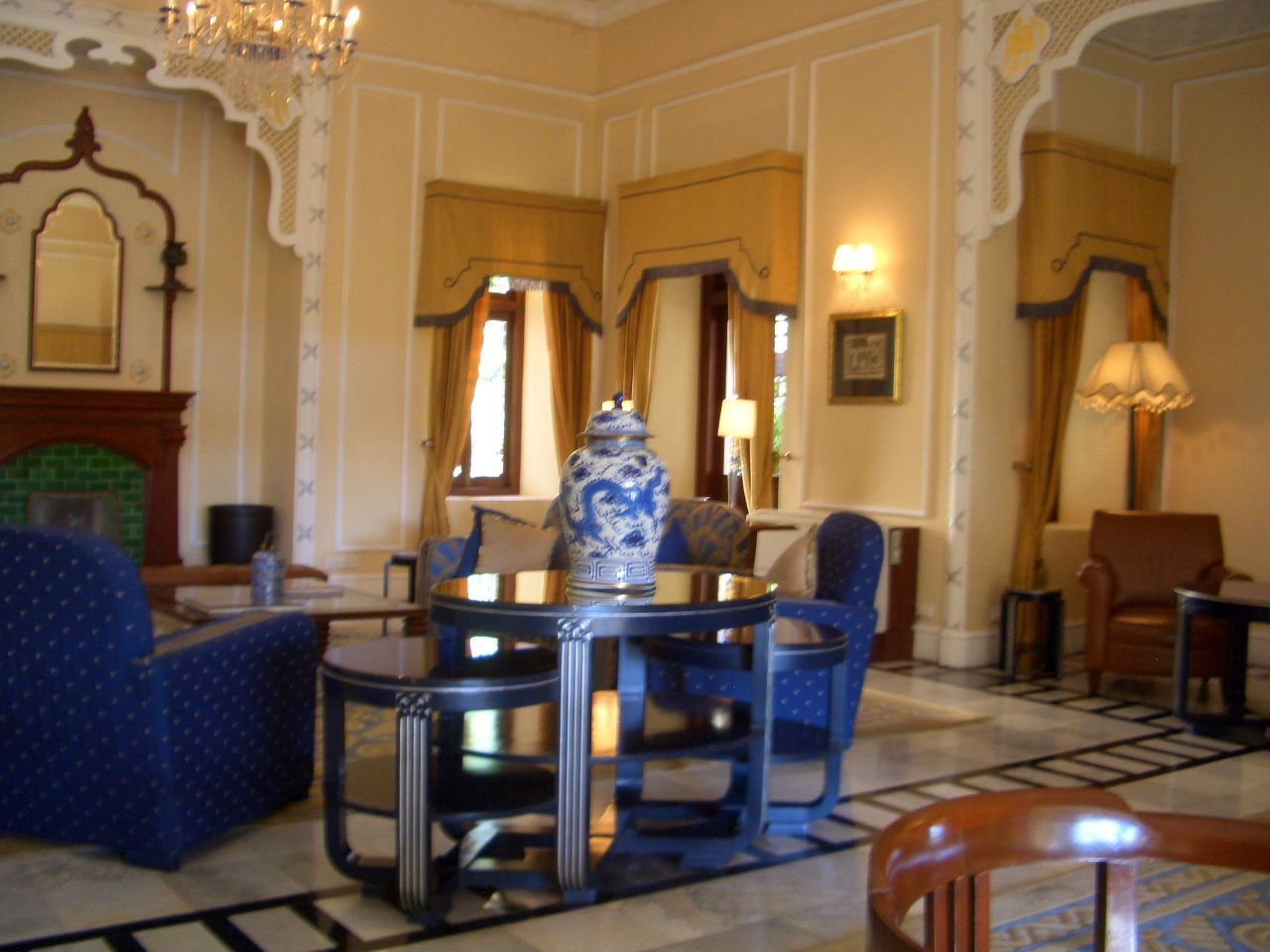
The lounge at Ananda in the Himalayas.

The word ananda means happiness in Sanskrit.

== History ==
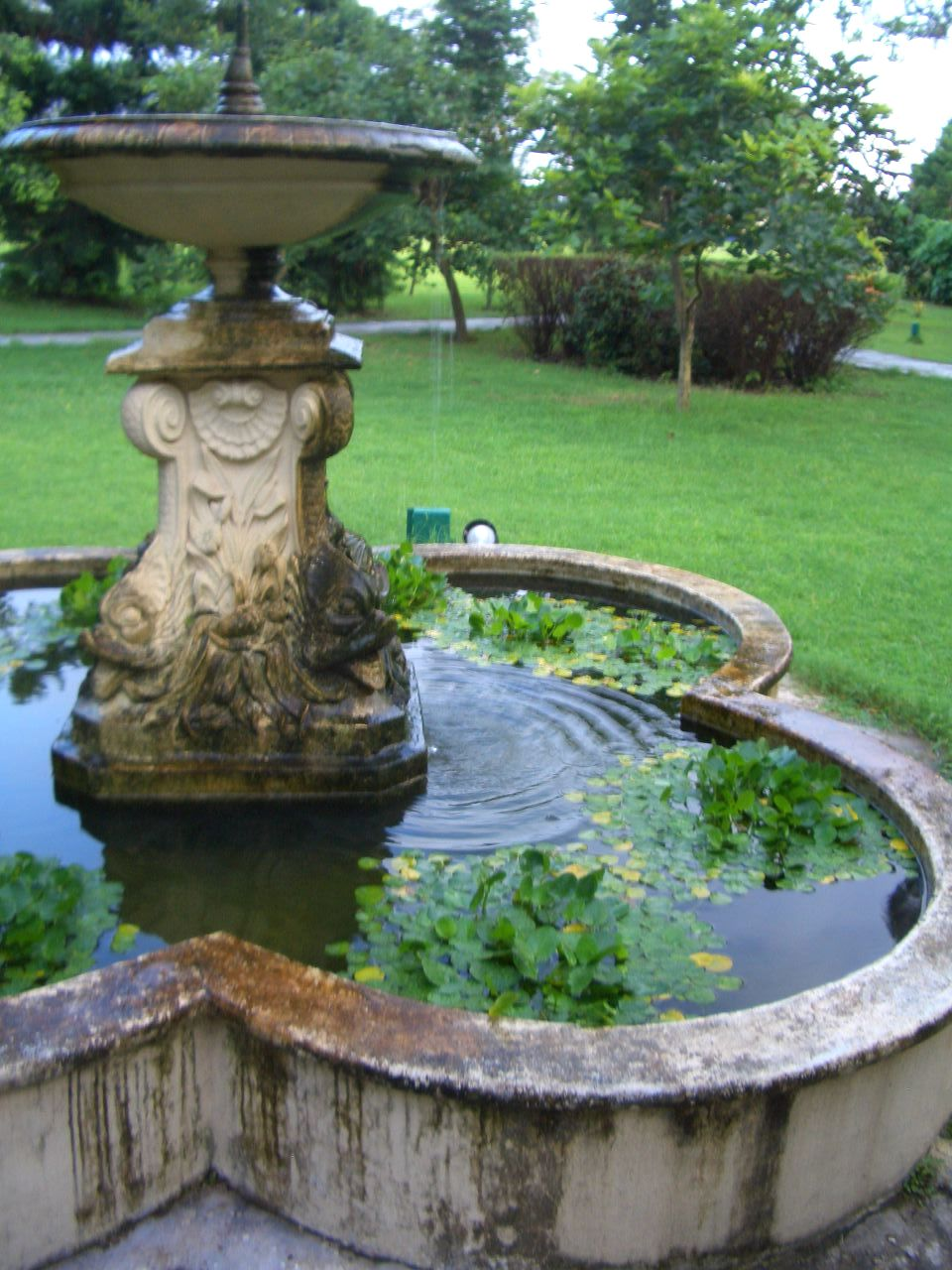
An old fountain, Ananda spa, Narendra Nagar

Some years ago, given the impetus on health and rejuvenation in the world and after an exhaustive search located a site for a destination spa, Ashok Khanna, discovered the Palace of the Maharaja at Narendra Nagar, Tehri-Garwhal. It was decided that the property was to be called "Ananda in the Himalayas", a name that embodies the spirit and ethos of what Khanna wanted to offer to his guests.

Soon the former Viceregal Palace close to the Royal palace of the Shah family, of the erstwhile princely state of Tehri Garhwal originally built in 1910–11, was restored. Narendra Nagar was the summer capital and the Palace, where the present viceregal suite of Ananda in the Himalayas is situated, is the official residence.

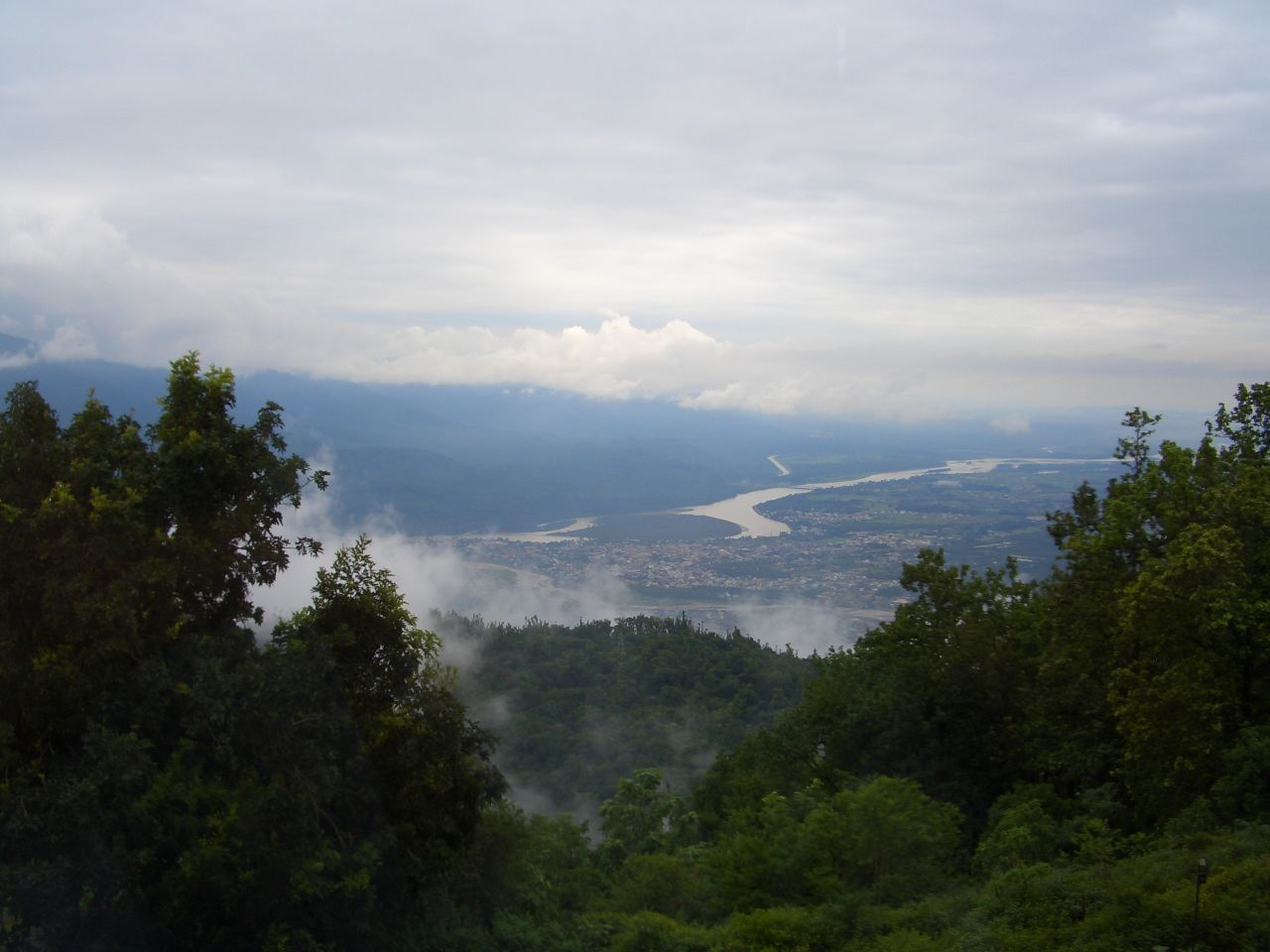
Himalayan view, from Ananda, with the meandering Ganges

Traditional Indian practices of yoga, meditation, ayurveda and vedanta are offered at the spa. Treatments include Ayurvedic spa treatments, Tibetan treatments and international therapies such as massage, body wraps and facials.

== Visitors ==
Ananda has been frequented by many famous guests, including Chris Froome and his wife Michelle Cound, Oprah Winfrey, Jerry Hall, Bill Gates and Melinda Gates, Kate Winslet, Frederick Forsyth, Deepak Chopra, Nicole Kidman, Jeremy Piven, Ricky Martin, Macklemore, Bharat Kavitha Golecha, Charles, Prince of Wales and Camilla, Duchess of Cornwall.

== Ratings ==
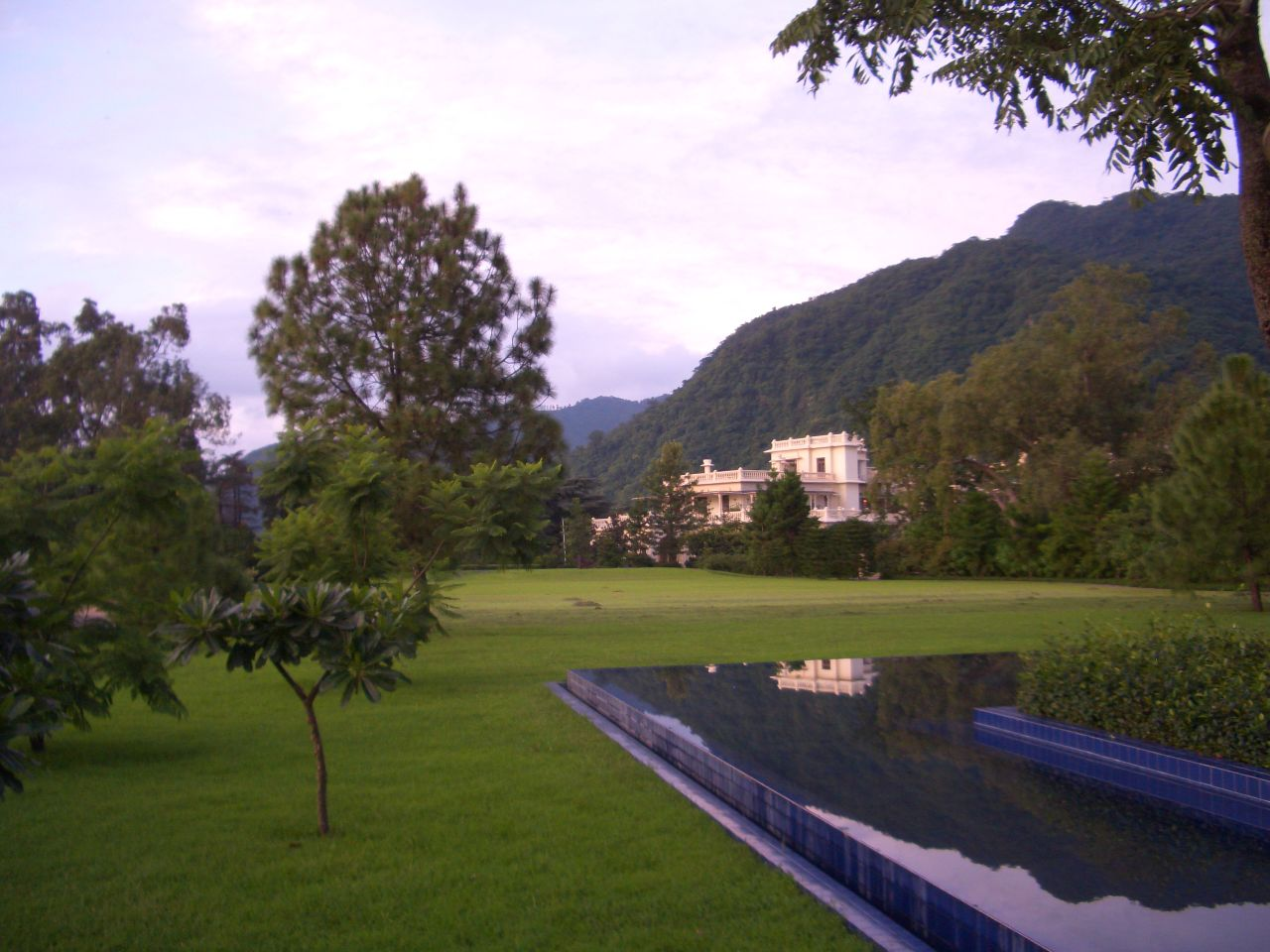
Lawns surrounding the 21,000 sq.ft. Ananda spa.

In 2005, Condé Nast Traveler rated this spa as the 'Best Overseas Spa Retreat' with a score rating of 99.62 and the Readers choice world's Number 1 destination spa (2005, 2006, 2007, 2012, 2019, 2020) It is also the only spa in India to be awarded the 5 wave certificate by BISA (British International Spa Association). Highly recommended by many other travel journals such as The New York Times, Travel and Leisure, While its judged as 'Top Spa in India' by Spa Finder, Inc. According to a reviewer of The Telegraph, Ananda "..mixes the healing principles of the East with the pampering needs of the West.".

== Business ==
Ananda is owned and managed by IHHR Hospitality Pvt. Ltd.

Ashok Khanna, the managing director of the company, is the grandson of legendary hotelier Rai Bahadur Mohan Singh Oberoi. Khanna is a graduate from the Cornell School of Hotel Administration and has over three decades of experience in hospitality. IHHR hospitality also founded a chain of luxury business hotels known as Ista Hotels. These hotels located in Hyderabad, Bangalore, Amritsar and Pune are now managed under the brand name "Hyatt".

== Education ==
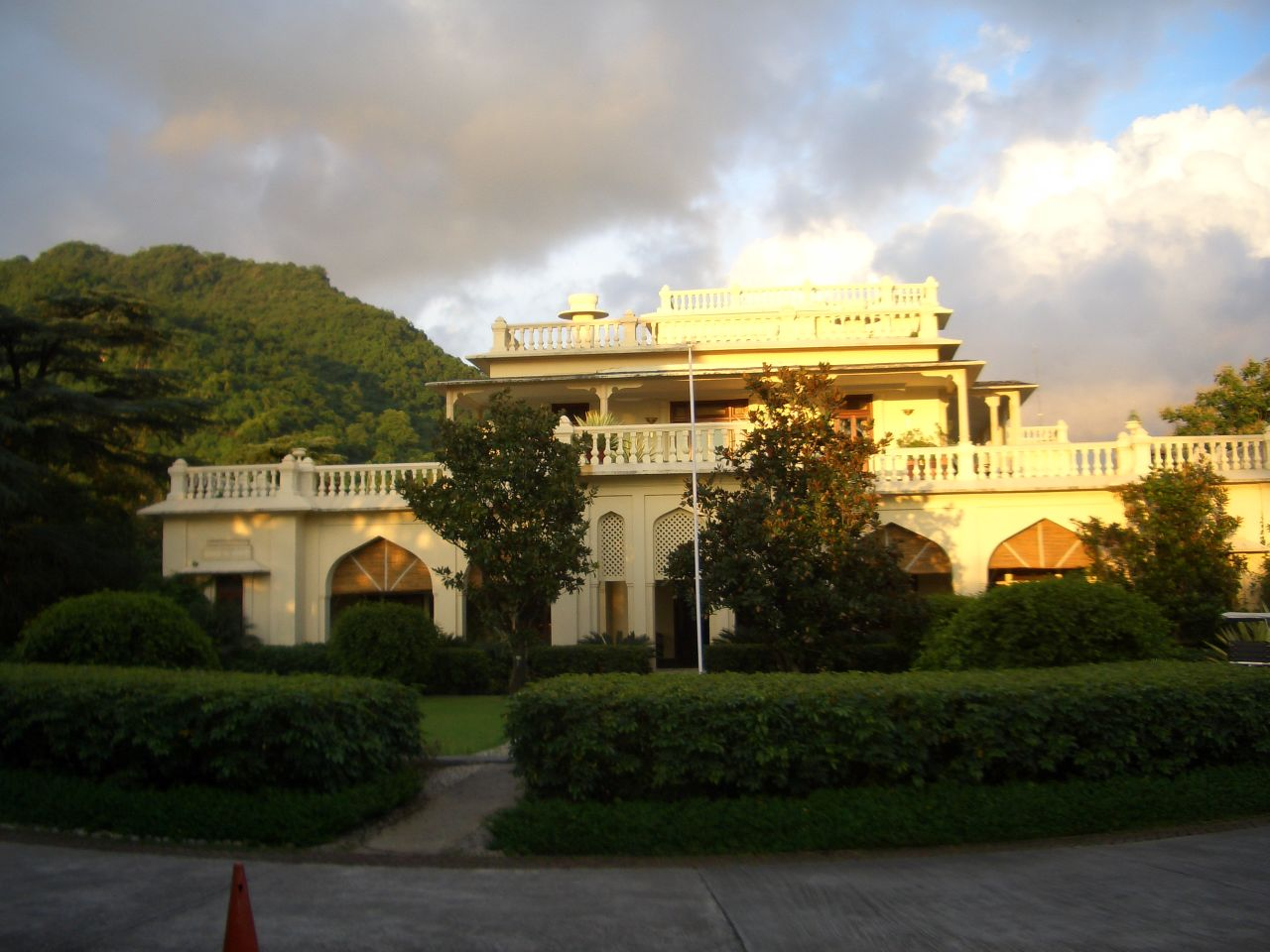
Back of the palace

The Ananda spa institute, located adjacent to the Ista hotel in Hyderabad, admitted its pilot group of students in the summer of 2008. This educational institution is the only one of its kind in the world that provides yoga, Ayurveda and international therapies under one roof. Realizing the importance of international certification, the institute has got the International Therapy Examination Council (ITEC), Confederation of International Beauty Therapy and Cosmetology (CIBTEC) to prescribe the curriculum for the courses on international treatments and give the required certification. The curriculum for the Yoga and Ayurveda courses will be framed and certified by the institute itself. The institute plans to lead spa education in South East Asia and maintain high standards throughout the region with international cooperation. Josephine Wackett has been appointed Principal. She was earlier with the world-famous Steiner School in London, where she was principal of the Steiner Beauty School for the last 30 years. Josephine is also the CIDESCO International Board member for Education.

== Sources ==
- "India: Mandarin group, Indian Hotels part ways on Himalayan resort," Businessline. Chennai: 27 December 2001. page 1.
- "Ayurveda Meets Five-Star Splendor at New 'Ananda,'" by Lisa Tsering. India - West. 18 May 2001, Vol.XXVI, Isse 29; page C32.
