= Kafald =

Akhori is a village in the Bhilangana block of Tehri Garhwal district, Uttarakhand, India. According to the 2011, Census of India has a population of 1,623, in 324 households, and two primary schools, one high school and one Intermediate College. The village lands cover an area of 326.8 hectares. The nearest major town is Ghansali.

The village code of Akhori is 249155. Akhori village is located in Ghansali tehsil of Tehri Garhwal district in Uttarakhand, India. It is situated 30 km away from sub-district headquarter Ghansali (tehsildar office) and 90 km away from district headquarter New Tehri. As per 2009 stats, Akhori village is also a gram panchayat.

The total geographical area of the village is 326.8 hectares. Akhori has a total population of 1,623peoples, out of which male population is 727 while female population is 896. Literacy rate of akhori village is 87.42% out 100% . There are about 324 houses in akhori village. Pincode of akhori village locality is 249155.

Tehri is nearest town to akhori for all major economic activities, which is approximately 90 km away.
