= Anand Sharan Raturi =

Indian educator

Anand Sharan Raturi (1919-1999) was an Indian educator who became the first vice-chancellor of M. J. P. Rohilkhand University in Uttar Pradesh, India.

== Biography ==
Raturi was born in 1919 to Godi-Sirai, Tehri Grahwal district in India to Satya Sharan Raturi and Bindeshwari Devi Ghildiyal-Raturi. After finishing his high school in Sirai, he moved to Mussoorie and finished his early education at Ghananda Inter College.

Raturi received a B.Com. from Agra University, an M.A. and D.Phil. (1947, in Economics) from the University of Allahabad, and a further M.A. from Harvard University.

After India attained independence he was appointed Finance Minister of Gharwal State (the state was later merged with Uttar Pradesh).

He was the first vice-chancellor of Rohilkhand University, combining over 100 colleges in Rohilkhand into one institution.

Raturi died in 1999.
