= Gairi Rajputon Ki =

- Village
- Location in Uttarakhand, India
- Coordinates: 30.5258°N 78.4549°E
- Country: India
- State: Uttarakhand
- District: Tehri Garhwal
- Development Block: Partap Nagar

Government
  - Type: Panchayat
  - Body: Gairi Rajputon Ki Gram Panchayat

Area
  - Total: 1.3429 km^{2} (0.5185 sq mi)
- Elevation: 1,750 m (5,740 ft)

Population (2011)
  - Total: 1,135
  - Density: 845.2/km^{2} (2,189/sq mi)

Languages
  - Official: Hindi
  - Native: Uttarakhandi Garhwali
- Time zone: UTC+5:30 (IST)
- PIN: 249196
- Telephone code: 01376
- Vehicle registration: UK 09

Gairi Rajputon Ki is a village in Pratapnagar tehsil of Tehri Garhwal district in the Indian state of Uttarakhand. Its 2011 census village code is 043466.

== Geography ==
The village covers an area of 134.29 hectares.

== Demographics ==
According to the 2011 Census of India, Gairi Rajputon Ki had a population of 1,135 living in 184 households, comprising 508 males and 627 females. Of the total population, 204 were children aged six or younger, including 106 boys and 98 girls.

The village had approximately 1,234 females per 1,000 males. Among children aged six or younger, there were approximately 925 girls per 1,000 boys.

The census recorded 667 literate residents, comprising 378 males and 289 females. Among residents aged seven and above, the literacy rate was 71.64%, with male literacy at 94.03% and female literacy at 54.63%.

== Governance ==
The village is administered by a Sarpanch (village head), who is its elected representative.
