= Chandrabadani Devi =

Hindu temple in Uttarakhand, India

Chandrabadni Devi
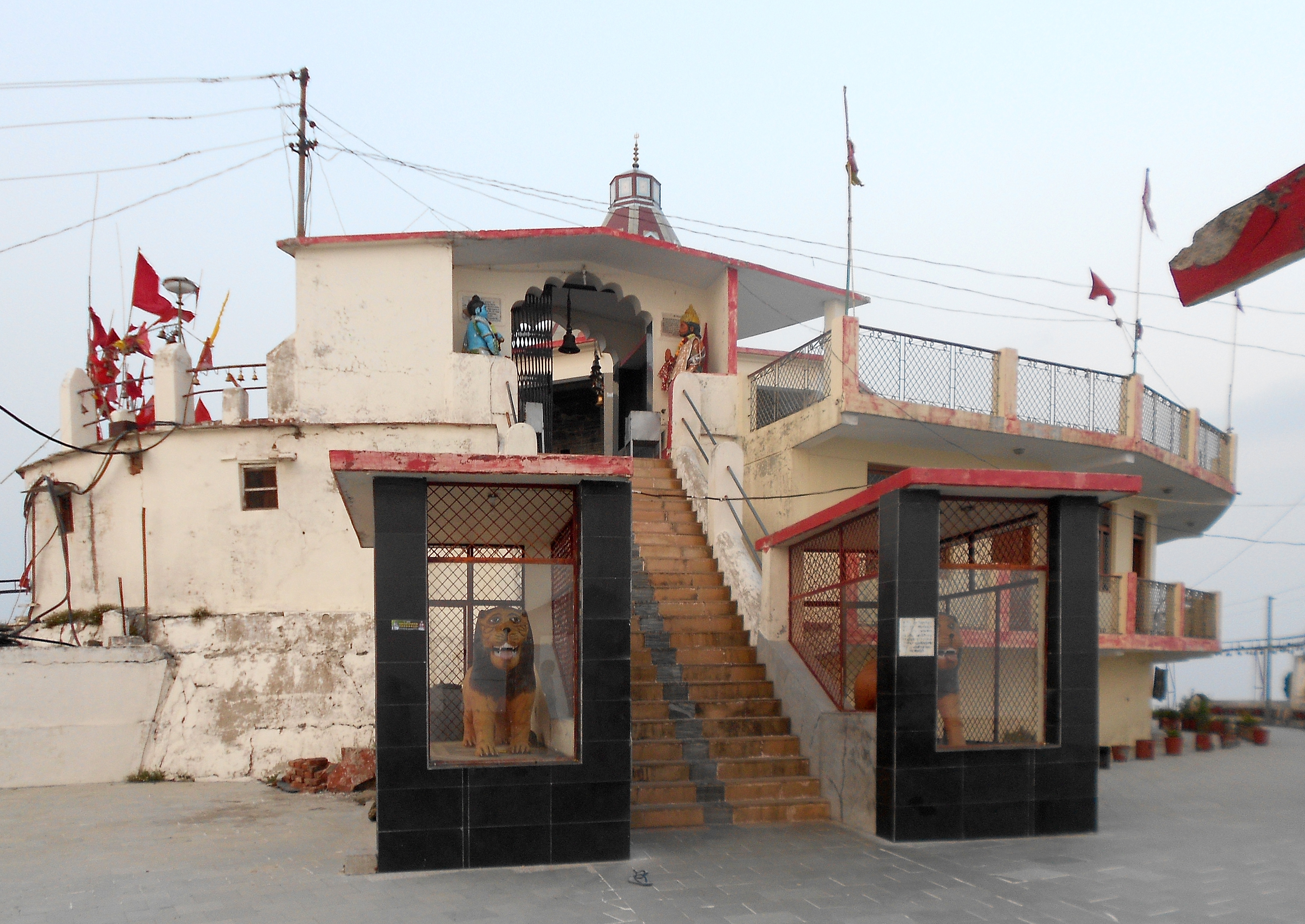
- Chandrabadni Devi

Religion
- Affiliation: Hinduism
- District: Tehri Garhwal
- Deity: Chandrabadni Devi

Location
- Location: About 10 km north of Kandi Khal, 32 km from Devprayag, 32 km from Tehri Dam and 109 km from Narendra Nagar
- State: Uttarakhand
- Country: India
- Interactive map of Chandrabadni Devi

Architecture
- Elevation: 2,277 m (7,470 ft)

Chandrabadani is a Siddhpeeth temple located on the border of Devaprayag and Pratapnagar tehsils. The temple is located 2,277 m above sea level, at the top of the Chandrakoot mountain about 32 km north of Devaprayag. It is equidistant from both Devprayag and the Tehri Dam, making it a significant spiritual landmark in the heart of the Garhwal Himalayas.

== In Indian mythology ==
The legend says that the torso of Sati fell here and her weapons got scattered all around the place. Thus, even today huge number of iron trishuls (tridents) and some old statues can be seen lying around the revered temple of Chandrabadani. The story of the temple is mentioned in the Skanda Purana. When Lord Shiva was carrying the burnt body of Maa Sati (who jumped in the Mahayagya of his father Daksh Prajapati to protest the disrespect of his husband Lord Shiva), the parts of her body scattered in different places and hence those places became Siddhpeeth. In this temple, her badan (body) was dropped; hence the name Chandrabadani.

== Priesthood ==
The temple priests traditionally belong to the Semalty Brahmin community of Pujar Gaon village, Taluk Devaprayag, located 9 km from the temple.

== Rituals, ceremonies, and fairs ==
The boutique temple is safely guarded by a Shri-yantra, skillfully carved on a flat stone instead of an idol. Each year, a cloth canopy is traditionally tied over the Shri-yantra. The Brahmin priest is blind-folded while performing the ritual. A big fair is held annually in the month of April in the premises of the Chandrabadni temple.

== Access, geography, and environment ==
By road, one can reach Jamnikhal, which is about 25 km from Devprayag by road and 109 km from Narendra Nagar. From Jamnikhal it is a 7 km plus one km walk uphill to Chandrabadani Temple. it is equidistant from both Devprayag and the Tehri Dam. The nearest railhead is at Rishikesh and the nearest airport is Jolly Grant of Dehradun. Once Rishikesh–Karnaprayag line project is completed, Pilgrims could reach out to Devaprayag by train from Rishikesh, Delhi and other destinations.

== Gallery ==
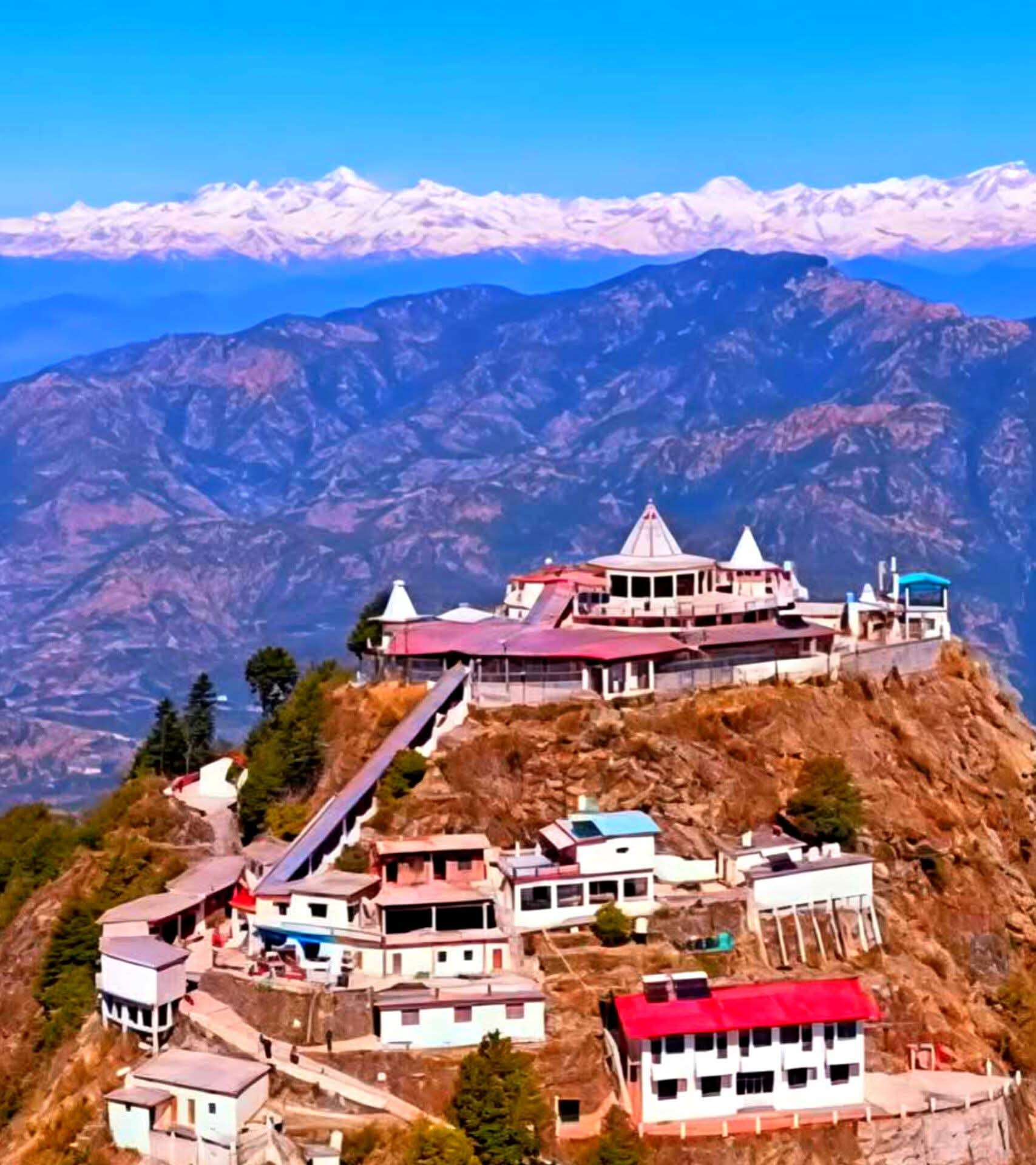
