= Kirtinagar =

- town
- Location in Uttarakhand, India Kirtinagar (India)
- Coordinates: 30.22°N 78.76°E
- Country: India
- State: Uttarakhand
- District: Tehri Garhwal

Population (2001)
  - Total: 1,040

Languages
  - Official: Hindi
- Time zone: UTC+5:30 (IST)
- PIN: 249161
- Telephone code: 01378
- Vehicle registration: UK
- Sex ratio: 1:1 ♂/♀
- Website: uk.gov.in

Kirtinagar is a town and a Nagar Panchayat and a Taluk in Tehri Garhwal district in the Indian state of Uttarakhand.

== Geography ==
Kirtinagar is located at 30.22°N 78.76°E. Kirtinagar Taluk contains around 20 villages.

== History ==
Kirtinagar was founded by Garhwal Raja Kirti Shah by the Alaknanda River in response to the destruction by flood of nearby Old Srinagar in 1894.

== Demographics ==
As of the 2011 Census Kirtinagar has a population of 1,517, of which 41% are females and 10% are children up to 6 years of age. The average literacy rate is 81%, higher than the state average of 79%, with male literacy at 79%, and female literacy at 85%. Over the ten years from 2001, the population has increased hugely, by 46% from 1040, and the proportions of females and children are both slightly down from their earlier 43% and 11% levels. Literacy is up from 76%.
