= Induced thymic epithelial cell =

An induced thymic epithelial cell (iTEC) is a cell that has been induced to become a thymic epithelial cell.
