= Tehri Garhwal district =

- District of Uttarakhand
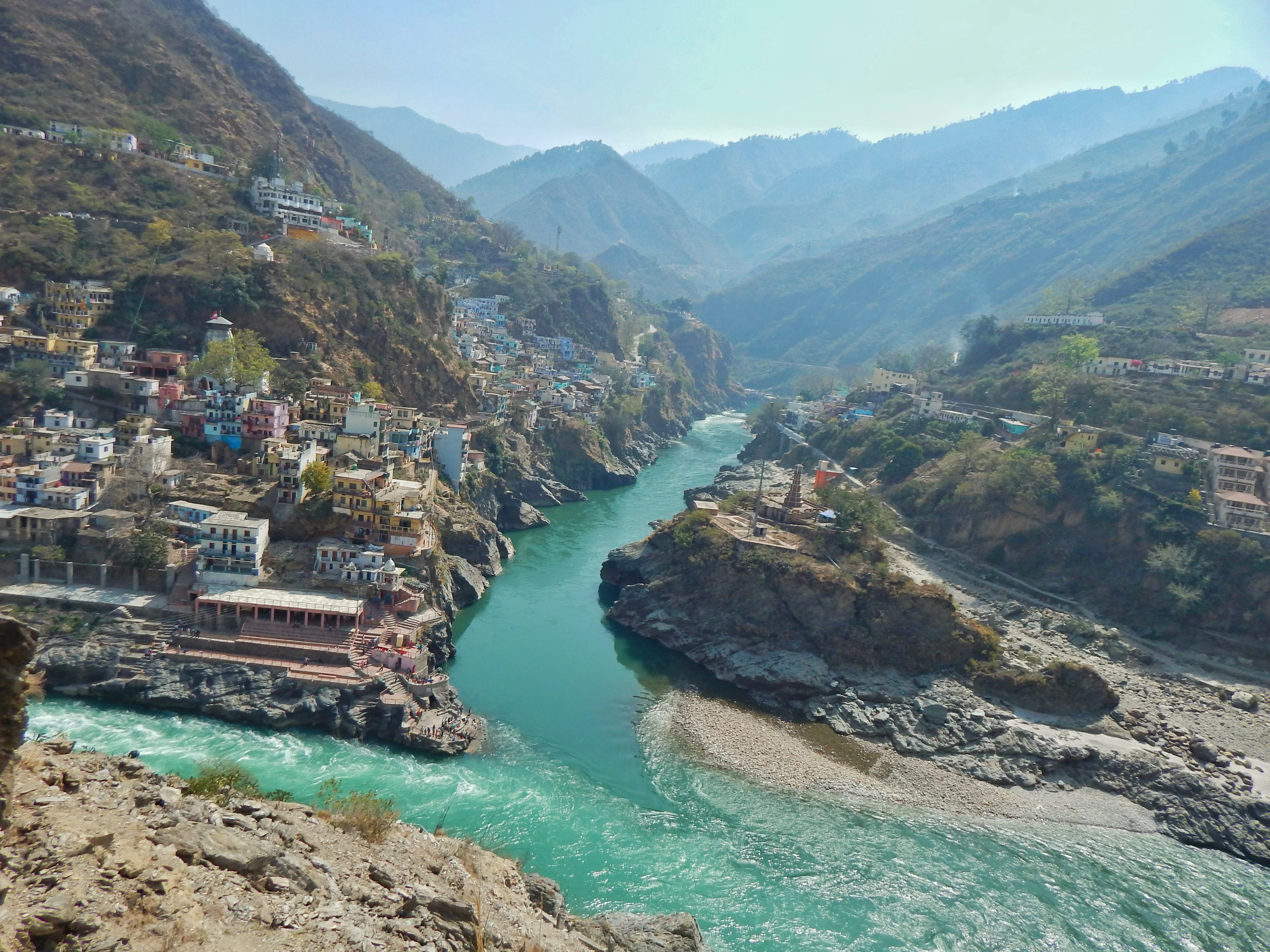
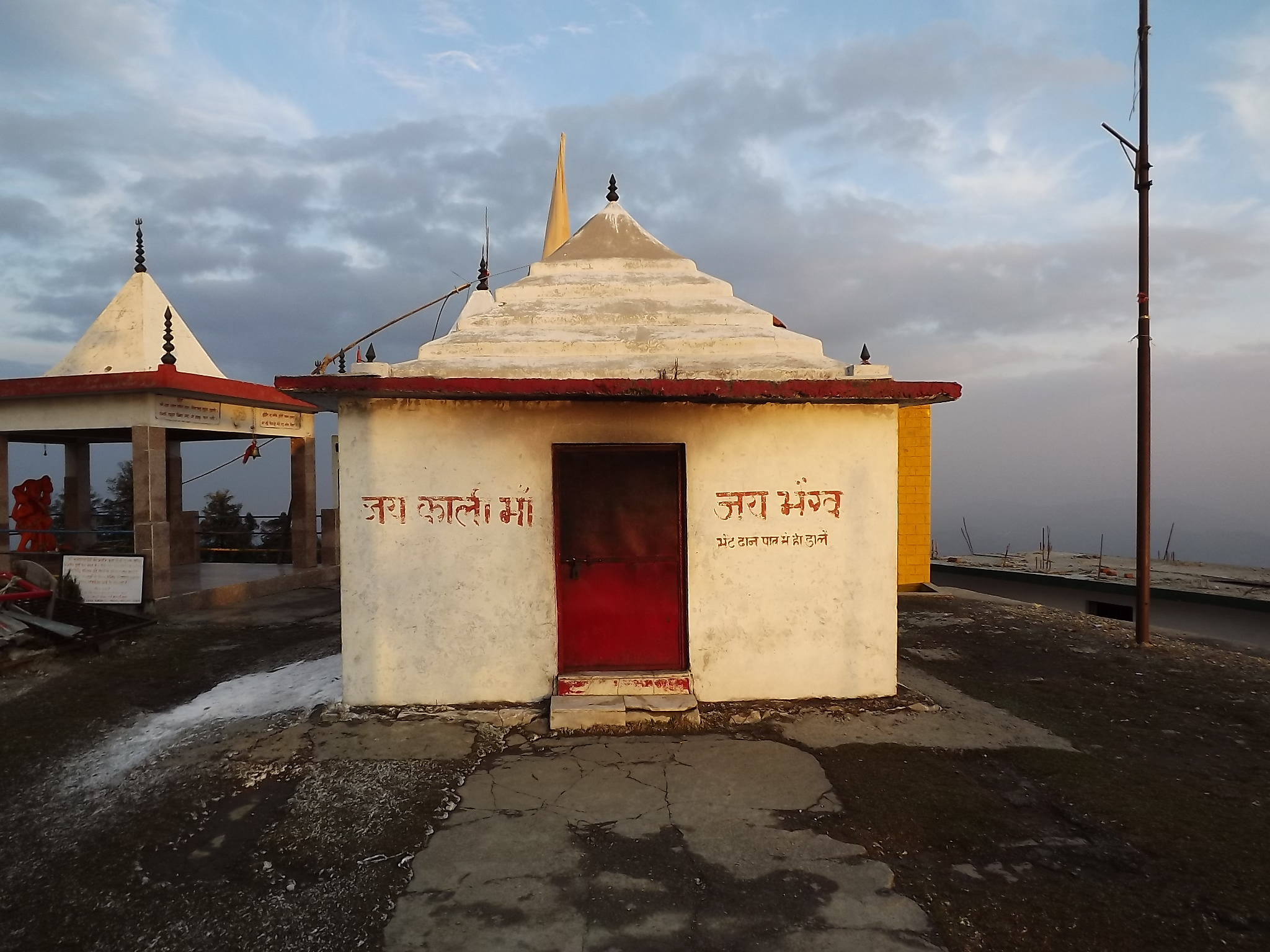
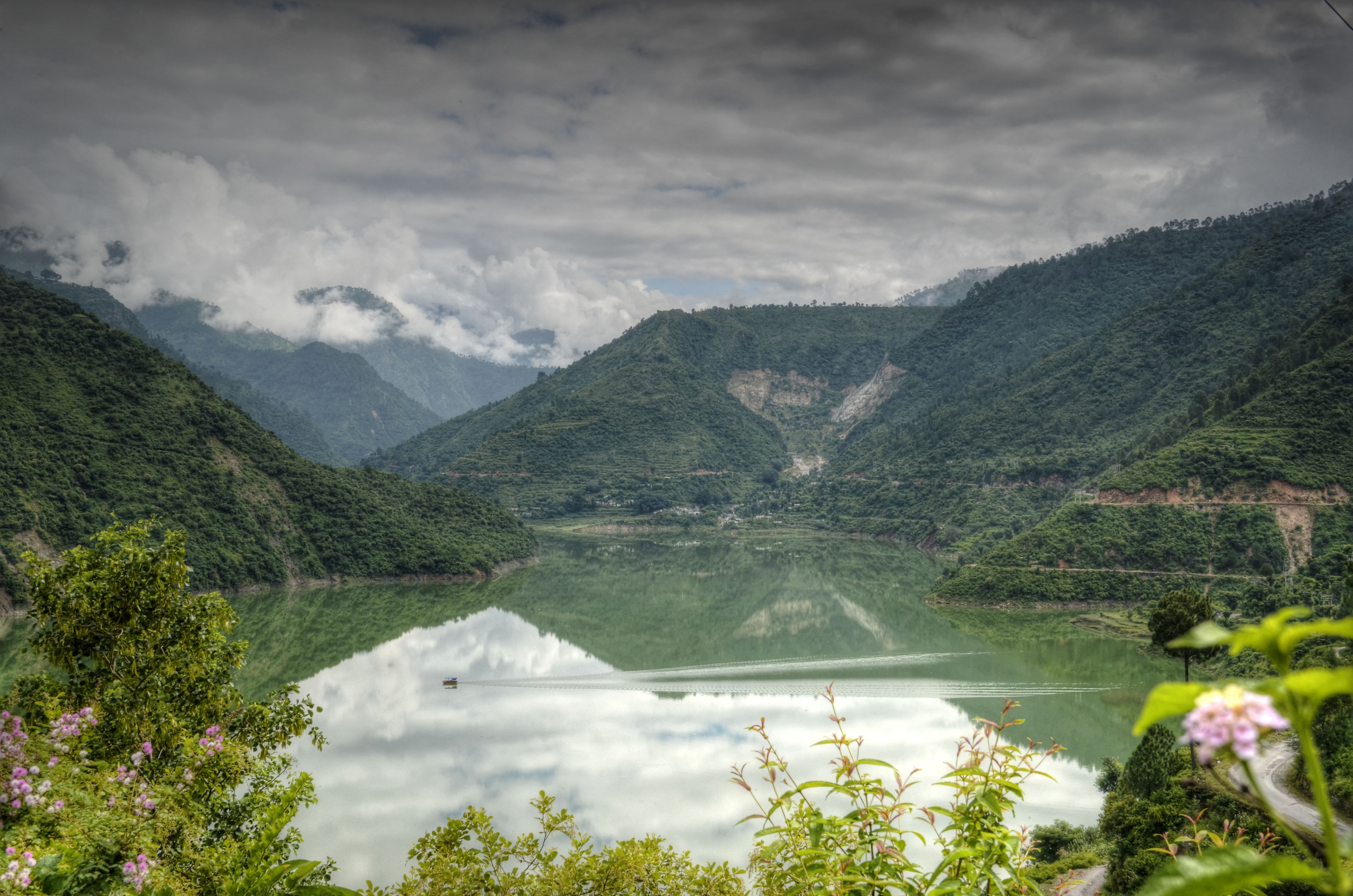
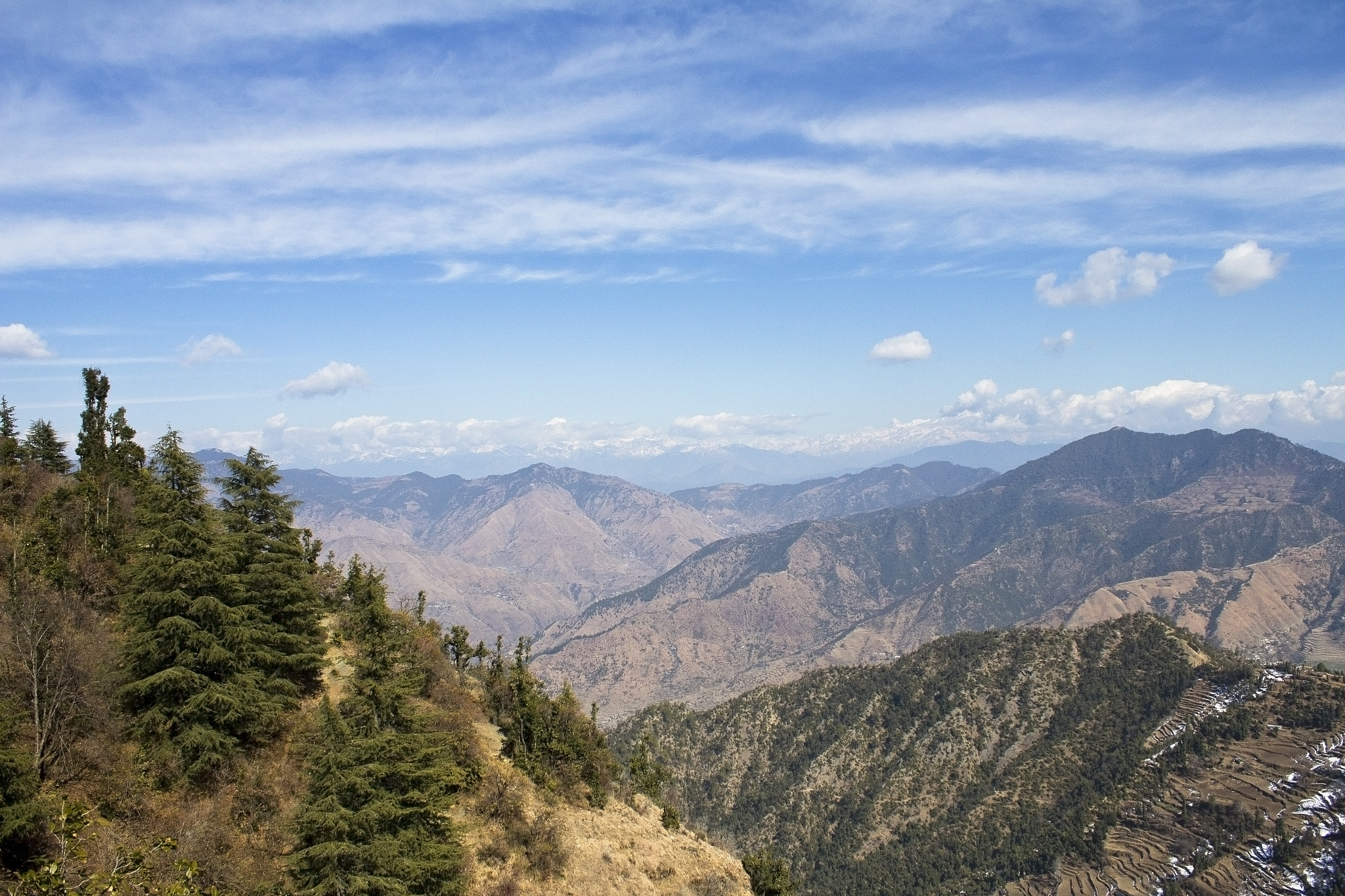
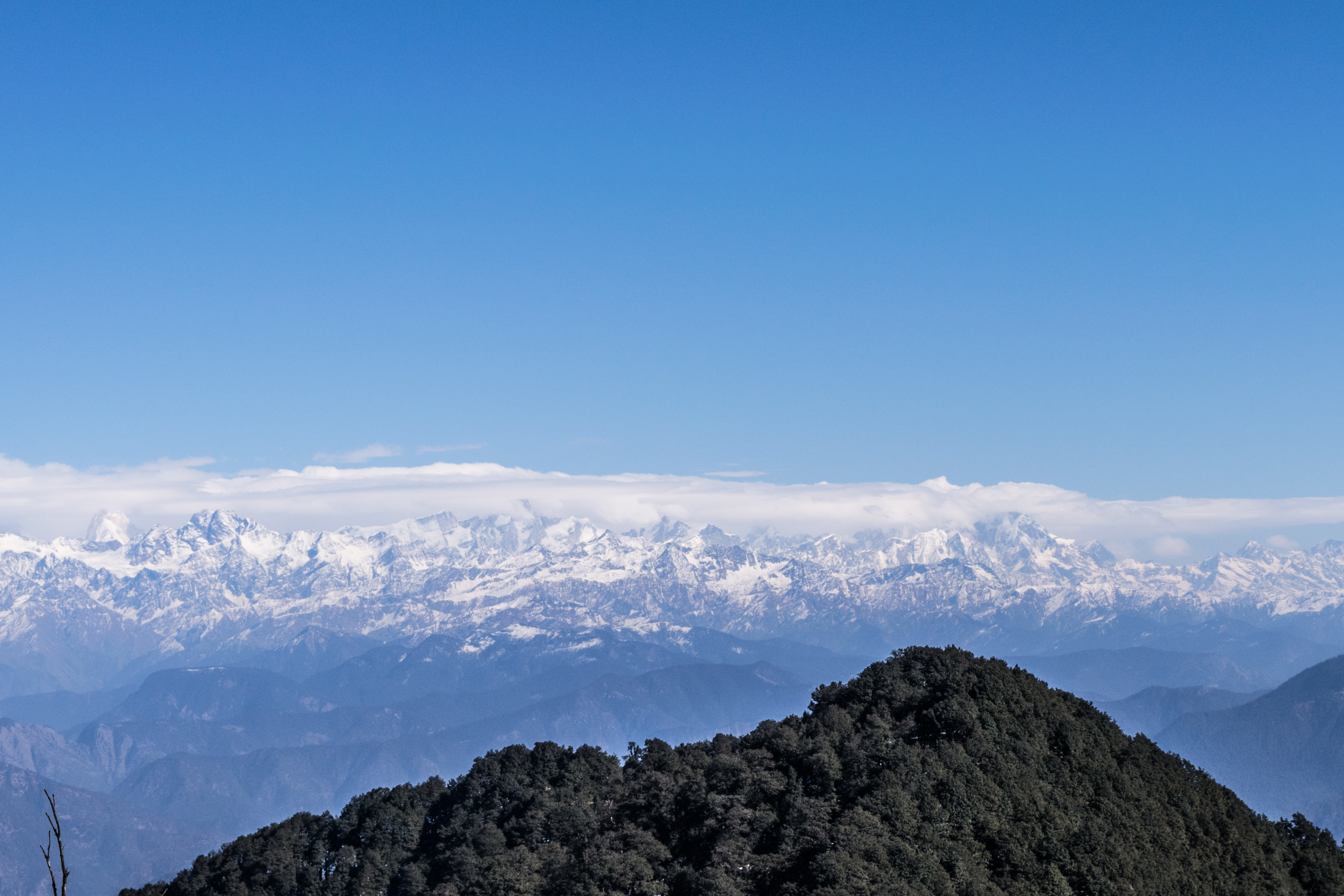
- Clockwise from top-left: Formation of Ganga river at Devprayag, Surkanda Devi Mandir, mountains near Dhanaulti, View of Himalayas from Nag Tibba, Tehri Dam

- Location in Uttarakhand
- Coordinates: 30.38°N 78.48°E
- Country: India
- State: Uttarakhand
- Division: Garhwal
- Headquarters: New Tehri

Government
  - District Magistrate: Nitika Khandelwal IAS

Area
  - Total: 4,080 km^{2} (1,580 sq mi)

Population
  - Total: 618,931
  - Density: 148/km^{2} (380/sq mi)

Languages
  - Official: Hindi; Sanskrit
  - Native: Garhwali; Jaunpuri
- Time zone: UTC+5:30 (IST)
- Vehicle registration: UK 09
- Website: tehri.nic.in

Tehri Garhwal district is a district in the hill state of Uttarakhand, India. Its administrative headquarters is at New Tehri. The district has a population of 618,931 (2011 census), a 2.35% increase over the previous decade. It is surrounded by Rudraprayag District in the east, Dehradun District in the west, Uttarkashi District in the north, and Pauri Garhwal District in the south. Tehri Garhwal is a part of the Himalayas.

== Etymology ==
The name Tehri has been derived from Trihari, signifying a place that washes away the three types of sins – sins born out of Mansa, Vacha and Karmana or thought, word and deed, respectively. Garh in Hindi means fort.

== History ==
=== Early ===
Prior to 734 CE, the region was divided into 52 garh which were ruled by independent kings. Kanakpal, on his visit to Badrinath, had met the then mightiest king Bhanu Pratap who later married his only daughter to the prince and handed over his kingdom to him. Kanakpal and his descendants gradually conquered all the garh and ruled the whole of Garhwal Kingdom for the next 915 years. These garh were brought into one province by maharaja Ajaypal, a great king of garhwal.

=== Gorkha Rule ===
In 1803, the Gorkhas invaded Garhwal commanded by army generals Amar Singh Thapa, Hastidal Shah Chautariya, Bamshah Chautariya and Ranjor Thapa against King Pradyumna Shah and his brothers Kunwar Parakrama Shah and Kunwar Pritam Shah. The Garhwal and Gorkha armies fought at Khurbura and the Garhwal king was killed. The Gorkhas occupied Dehradun, Saharanpur and Shimla and later extended their kingdom up to Kangra.

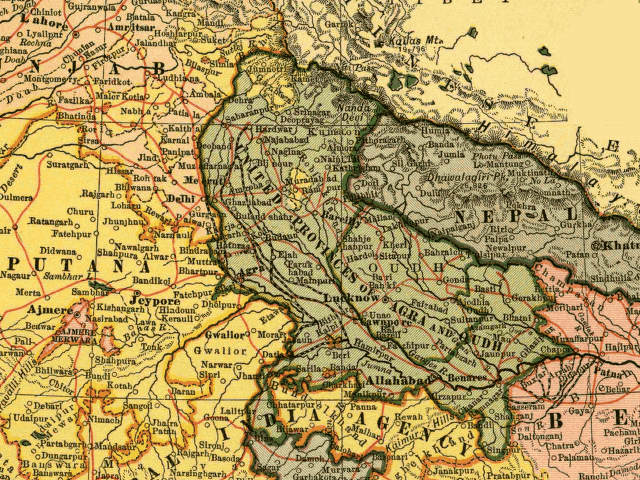
1903 map of United Provinces showing the boundaries of Garhwal Kingdom

From 1787 to 1812, the Gorkhas invaded and occupied nearly 200 villages which were under the control of the East India Company. The British argued with the king but to no avail. The Gurkha War began in 1814, when an army of 8,000 under Major General Marley attacked Kathmandu. Four thousand soldiers under Major General Wood started an operation from Gorakhpur and 3,500 soldiers attempted to take over Dehradun under Major General Zileswy. The British army captured Dehradun on 30 November 1814 and moved towards Kumaon. The Gorkha commanders Hastidal Shah and Jayrakha were killed at Vinayathal. The war ended with the Sugauli Treaty, signed on 2 December 1815 and ratified on 4 March 1816 by Gorkha supreme commander Bamshah and thus, British rule started in the hills. The East India Company then merged Kumaon, Dehradun and east Garhwal into the British Empire while west Garhwal was given back to Sudarshan Shah, then becoming known as Tehri Riyasat.

=== Garhwal Kingdom ===
Princely flag of Tehri Garhwal.

Tehri Garhwal, or the Garhwal Kingdom, was a princely state ruled by the Rajput Parmar (Shah) dynasty. Later, it became a part of the Punjab Hill States Agency of British India, which consists of the present day Tehri Garhwal District and most of the Uttarkashi district. In 1901, it had an area of about 4,180 square miles (10,800 km^{2}) and a population of 268,885. The ruler was given the title of raja, but after 1913, he was honoured with the title of Maharaja. The ruler was entitled to salutes of 11 guns and had a privy purse of rupees 300,000.

King Sudarshan Shah established his capital at Tehri town and afterwards his successors Pratap Shah, Kirti Shah and Narendra Shah established their capital at Pratap Nagar, Kirtinagar and Narendra Nagar, respectively. Their dynasty ruled over this region from 1815 to 1949. During the Quit India Movement people of this region actively worked for the independence of the country. Ultimately, when the country was declared independent in 1947, the inhabitants of Tehri Riyasat (Tehri State) started their movement to free themselves from the clutches of the maharaja.

Due to this movement, the situation became out of his control and it was difficult for him to rule over the region. Consequently, the 60th king of Panwar Vansh, Manabendra Shah, accepted the sovereignty of the Indian government. Thus, in August 1949, Tehri Riyasat was merged into Uttar Pradesh and was given the status of a new district, the Tehri Garhwal district. Subsequently, on 24 February 1960, the state government separated its one tehsil which was given the status of a separate district named Uttarkashi. The former royal palace of the Maharaja of Tehri Garhwal at Narendra Nagar, now houses the Ananda In the Himalayas spa, established 2000.

=== Modern developments ===
In the 1960s, Tehri Garhwal extended much farther east than it currently does. In 1997, much of the eastern portion of Tehri Garhwal was detached and merged with portions of the Pauri Garhwal district and the Chamoli district to form the Rudraprayag district.

Tehri Lake
With a surface area of 52 km^{2}, a man-made lake in New Tehri, is the largest lake in Uttarakhand. It has good options for Adventure Sports and various water sports like Boating, Banana Boat, Bandwagon Boat, Jet Ski, Water Skiing, Para-sailing, Kayaking.

== Notable people ==
- Gabar Singh Negi - Indian soldier and recipient of the Victoria Cross
- Ajay Kothiyal - Former officer of the Indian Army
- Sri Dev Suman - Indian independence activist from Tehri Garhwal

== Economy ==
Tehri Garhwal economy revolves around Public sector undertakings, Agriculture and Tourism.

== Crops ==
Dry season crops include wheat, barley, masoor, Bengal and red gram, rapeseed and mustard, and pea. Wet season crops include rice, barnyard millet, finger millet, black gram, sesame and soybean. Various fruits and spices grow in the district also.

== Assembly Constituencies ==
1. Ghanshali (SC)
2. Devprayag
3. Narendranagar
4. Pratapnagar
5. Tehri
6. Dhanulti

== Administrative setup ==
The district of Tehri Garhwal is divided into two subdivisions: Kirti Nagar and Tehri-Pratap Nagar. It has seven tehsils, one sub-tehsil, nine blocks, two municipalities and four town area committees. The district covers 76 Nagar Panchayats and 928 gram panchayats. It has 1,847 revenue villages and 2,508 clusters.

Particulars	Number	Name
Subdivisions	6	Kirti Nagar, Tehri, Pratap Nagar, Narendra nagar, Dhanolti, ghansali
Tehsils	11	Devprayag, Ghansali, Narendra Nagar, Pratap Nagar, Tehri, Jakhanidhar Dhanolti, kirti nagar, Kandisaur and Nainbaag, Gaja
Sub-Tehsil	3	Madan Negi, balganga (chamiyala), paw ki devi
Blocks	9	Bhilangana, Chamba, Devprayag, Jakhanidhar, Jaunpur, Kirtinagar, Narendra Nagar, Pratapnagar and Thauldhar
Municipalities	4	Tehri, Narendra Nagar, Chamba and Devprayag
Town area committees	2	Kirtinagar and Muni Ki Reti

== Villages ==
- Bairola
- Gairi Rajputon Ki
- Kafald
- Mathesari
- Saunla
- Takoli

== Demographics ==
Historical population
Year	Pop.	±% p.a.
1901	180,788	—
1911	202,264	+1.13%
1921	214,090	+0.57%
1931	235,038	+0.94%
1941	267,178	+1.29%
1951	277,115	+0.37%
1961	313,210	+1.23%
1971	358,117	+1.35%
1981	446,472	+2.23%
1991	520,256	+1.54%
2001	604,747	+1.52%
2011	618,931	+0.23%

According to the 2011 census Tehri Garhwal district has a population of 618,931, roughly equal to the nation of Solomon Islands or the US state of Vermont. This gives it a ranking of 520th in India (out of a total of 688). The district has a population density of 169 inhabitants per square kilometre (440/sq mi). Its population growth rate over the decade 2001–2011 was 1.93%. Tehri Garhwal has a sex ratio of 1078 females for every 1000 males, and a literacy rate of 75.1%. Scheduled Castes and Scheduled Tribes make up 16.50% and 0.14% of the population respectively.

Religions in Tehri Garhwal district (2011)
Religion	Per cent
Hinduism	98.53%
Islam	1.19%
Other or not stated	0.28%
Distribution of religions

Hindus number 596,769; Muslims 6,390 (1.05%); and Sikhs 561.

Languages of Tehri Garhwal district (2011)
1. Garhwali (90.5%)
2. Hindi (5.99%)
3. Jaunsari (0.98%)
4. Nepali (0.95%)
5. Others (1.60%)

The major first language of the district is Garhwali, accounting for 90.5% of the population according to the 2011 census. Hindi is widely used as a lingua franca, but is the first language of only 6% of the people. Other languages spoken include Jaunsari (0.98%) and Nepali (0.95%).

== Notable people ==
- Anand Sharan Raturi, educator
- Sunderlal Bahuguna, environmentalist
- Sridev suman freedom fighter, social activist

== See also ==
- Pauri Garhwal
- Garhwal Kingdom
