= Kanatal =

- Village
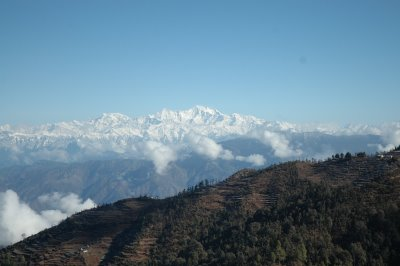
- Interactive map of Kanatal
- Location in Uttarakhand, India Kanatal (India)
- Coordinates: 30.4179°N 78.3203°E
- Country: India
- State: Uttarakhand
- District: Tehri garhwal
- Elevation: 2,400 m (7,900 ft)

Languages
  - Official: Hindi
- Time zone: UTC+5:30 (IST)
- Vehicle registration: UK 07, UK 09
- Website: uk.gov.in

Kanatal is a small village that is a hill station in the Tehri Garwhal district, state Uttarakhand, India. Kanatal is 78 km from Dehradun (capital of the State Uttarakhand), 38 km from Mussoorie and 18 km from Chamba. It is on the Chamba-Mussoorie road and nearly 300 km from Delhi.

== History ==
Surkanda Devi is a temple in Kaddukhal, dedicated to Sati. Surkanda is where the head of Sati had fallen after Shiva carried her on his trishool after she set herself on fire.

== Climate ==
During the summer, temperatures range from 10 to 20 °C (50 to 68 °F), and during the winter, temperatures range from −5 to 10 °C (23 to 50 °F). During the winter, heavy snowfall blocks roads in the area. Kanatal is subject to high winds due to its high altitude.

== Geography ==
Kanatal is located at an elevation of approximately 8,500 feet (2,600 meters).

== Accessibility ==
Kanatal is connected by road to Delhi and other major cities. Accessible from Rishikesh or Dehradun. Both are connected by railways from Delhi. The nearest airport is in Dehradun.
