= Surkanda Devi =

Hindu temple to Durga

Surkanda Devi Temple
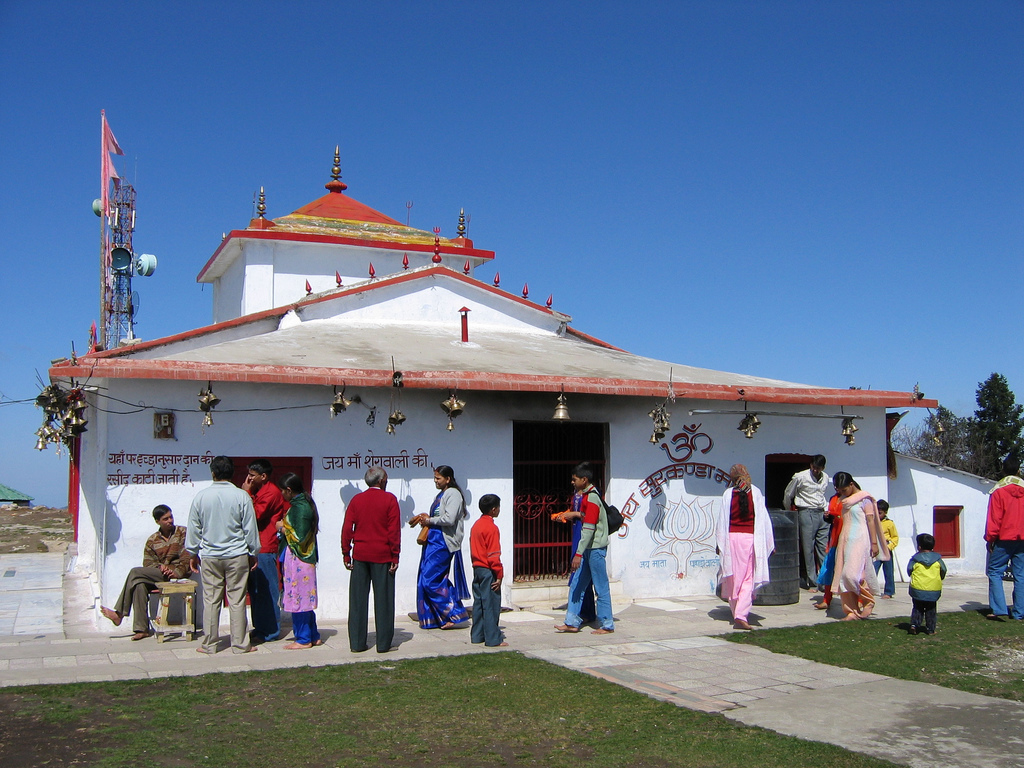

- Location in Uttarakhand

Religion
- Affiliation: Hinduism
- District: Tehri Garhwal district
- Deity: Surkanda Devi (Shakti)
- Festivals: Ganga Dussehra, Navratri

Location
- Location: Kaddukhal, near Dhanaulti
- State: Uttarakhand
- Country: India
- Coordinates: 30.411383°N 78.2887°E

Architecture
- Type: Traditional Himalayan stone temple, Pagoda
- Elevation: 2,756 m (9,042 ft)

Surkanda Devi Temple is a Hindu shrine located near Dhanaulti in the Tehri Garhwal district of Uttarakhand, India. Situated at an altitude of approximately 2,756 metres (9,042 feet), the temple offers panoramic views of the Himalayan ranges. It is one of the Shakta pithas, associated with the mythological event where the head of the Hindu goddess Sati is believed to have fallen and marked the place as a sacred center of divine consciousness.

== Legend ==
According to Hindu mythology, Sati, the daughter of King Daksha and consort of Shiva, self-immolated during a sacrificial ritual (yajna) conducted by her father after he insulted Shiva. Grief-stricken, Shiva wandered the universe carrying Sati's body. To pacify Shiva and restore cosmic balance, Vishnu dismembered Sati's corpse with his Sudarshana Chakra. The places where her body parts fell became known as the Shakta pitha Chandrabadani Devi. Surkanda Devi Temple marks the spot where her head is said to have fallen.
