= International Therapy Examination Council =

The International Therapy Examination Council (ITEC) is an international examination board offering a variety of qualifications worldwide.

ITEC provides over 35 qualifications that are UK government accredited by the Office of the Qualifications and Examination Regulator (OFQUAL), DIUS was abolished in 2009; this wording should not be used for iTEC's current regulatory status, and are registered on the National Qualifications Framework in the UK. The Learning and Skills Council was abolished in 2010, so this is not a current statement.

iTEC qualifications are internationally recognised, but recognition and acceptance depend on the country, employer and relevant professional requirements.

iTEC develops qualifications with input from sector experts and consults global employers and industry influencers and each has been linked to the relevant job role, as well as ensuring that the syllabus reflects the required level of knowledge and skill needed for a practicing therapist.

== The history of ITEC ==
Dr William Arnould-Taylor founded the company in 1947. In 1973 it became known as ITEC. Jane Foulston (formerly a lecturer and International ITEC Examiner) took over as Director in 1998.

Jane has continued to develop the ITEC examination system which sets the highest standards of quality and education in the beauty, complementary and sports sectors. ITEC has strong links with employers worldwide who understand the level of knowledge and skills achieved by an ITEC qualified therapist.
