= 2013 Uttarakhand local elections =

Local elections in India

2013 Uttarakhand municipal general elections
- 28 April 2013
- Turnout: 61℅(▲1 pp)

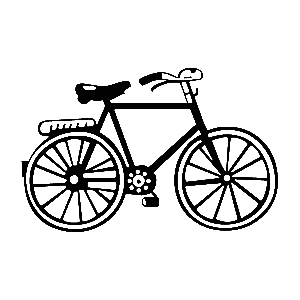

	First party	Second party	Third party
Leader	Tirath Singh Rawat	Yashpal Arya
Party	BJP	INC	BSP
Leader since	2013	2007
Last election	195	152	13
Seats won	202	155	7
Seat change	▲7	▲3	▼6
	Fourth party	Fifth party	Sixth party
Leader		Trivendra Singh Panwar	none
Party	SP	UKD	Independent
Leader since		2012
Last election	6	5	322
Seats won	2	2	391
Seat change	▼4	▼3	▲69

The 2013 Uttarakhand Municipal general elections were held in the Indian state of Uttarakhand on 28 April 2013.

The Uttarakhand State Election Commission announced the poll dates on 5 April 2013. The results were declared on 30 April 2013.

Elections are not held in the nagar panchayats of Badrinath, Kedarnath and Gangotri due to their status of temporary settlements. Local interim administration councils administer these three pilgrimage sites for a period of six months during the summers.

Event	Date
Date for Nominations	8 April 2013
Last Date for filing Nominations	12 April 2013
Date for scrutiny of nominations	13 April 2013
Last date for withdrawal of candidatures	15 April 2013
Allotment of Symbols	16 April 2013
Date of poll	28 April 2013
Date of counting	30 April 2013

== Results ==
=== Municipal Corporation Mayoral results ===
Municipal Corporation Mayoral results
S. No.	Municipal Corporation	District	Winner	Party	Runner-up	Party	Margin
1	Dehradun Municipal Corporation	Dehradun	Vinod Chamoli	Bharatiya Janata Party	Suryakant Dhasmana	Indian National Congress	22,912
2	Haldwani Municipal Corporation	Nainital	Jogendra Pal Singh Rautela	Bharatiya Janata Party	Abdul Mateen Siddiqui	Samajwadi Party	1,409
3	Haridwar Municipal Corporation	Haridwar	Manoj Garg	Bharatiya Janata Party	Rishishwaranand	Indian National Congress	17,147
4	Kashipur Municipal Corporation	Udham Singh Nagar	Usha Chaudhary	Independent	Ruqsana Ansari	Bahujan Samaj Party	7,418
5	Roorkee Municipal Corporation	Haridwar	Yashpal Rana	Independent	Mahendra Kumar Arora	Bharatiya Janata Party	110
6	Rudrapur Municipal Corporation	Udham Singh Nagar	Soni Koli	Bharatiya Janata Party	Mamta Rani	Indian National Congress	4,042

=== Municipal Council Chairpersons results ===
Municipal Council Chairpersons results
S. No.	Municipal Council	District	Winner	Party	Runner-up	Party	Margin
1	Pithoragarh	Pithoragarh	Jagat Singh Khati	Indian National Congress	Rajendra Singh	Bharatiya Janata Party	3,228

=== Municipal general election results ===
Municipal general election results
Party	Mayors/Chairpersons		Corporators/Ward Members		Total	
Party	Seats	+/-	Seats	+/-	Seats	+/-
Bharatiya Janata Party	22	▲4	180	▲3	202	▲7
Indian National Congress	20	▲3	135	Steady	155	▲3
Bahujan Samaj Party	3	Steady	4	▼6	7	▼6
Samajwadi Party	1	▲1	1	▼5	2	▼4
Uttarakhand Kranti Dal	1	▲1	1	▼4	2	▼3
Independents	22	Steady	369	▲69	391	▲69
Total	69	▲9	690	▲57	759	▲66

== See also ==
- 2013 Dehradun Municipal Corporation election
- 2013 Haridwar Municipal Corporation election
- 2013 elections in India
