= 2018 Dehradun Municipal Corporation election =

Election in Uttarakhand, India

← 2013	18 November 2018	2025 →

All 100 seats in the Dehradun Municipal Corporation 51 seats needed for a majority

	Majority party	Minority party	Third party
Leader	Sunil Uniyal 'Gama'	Dinesh Agrawal	none
Party	BJP	INC	Independent
Last election	34	22	2
Seats won	60	34	6
Seat change	▲26	▲12	▲4
Mayor before election
Vinod Chamoli
BJP
Elected mayor
Sunil Uniyal 'Gama'
BJP

The 2018 Dehradun Municipal Corporation election was a municipal election to the Dehradun Municipal Corporation which governs Dehradun City, the largest city in Uttarakhand. It took place on 18 November 2018.

To the 100-ward body, 60 members from the Bharatiya Janata Party were elected, while 34 came from the Indian National Congress and remaining six being Independents.

== Election schedule ==
The Uttarakhand State Election Commission announced the poll dates on 15 October 2018, that the election would be held on 18 November and that the result would be declared on 20 November.

Event	Date	Day
Date for Nominations	20 Oct 2018	Saturday
Last Date for filing Nominations	23 Oct 2018	Tuesday
Date for scrutiny of nominations	25 Oct 2018; 26 Oct 2018	Thursday; Friday
Last date for withdrawal of candidatures	27 Oct 2018	Saturday
Allotment of Symbols	29 Oct 2018	Monday
Date of poll	18 Nov 2018	Sunday
Date of counting	20 Nov 2018	Tuesday

== Mayoral election ==
2018 Dehradun Municipal Corporation Election: Mayor
Party	Candidate	Votes	%	±%
BJP	Sunil Uniyal	162,516	46.41	▲5.48
INC	Dinesh Agrawal	1,26,884	36.24	▲6.96
AAP	Rajni Rawat	28,978	8.27	new
Independent	Jagmohan Mehndiratta	4,268	1.21	new
BSP	Vibhuti Bhushan	2,416	0.69	▼23.04
Independent	Sardar Khan (Pappu)	2,075	0.59	▼0.52
UKD	Vijay Kumar Baurai	1,978	0.56	▼1.17
LJP	Ram Sukh	1,787	0.51	new
Independent	Abhay Joshi	1,654	0.47	new
Independent	Vijay Jagwan	739	0.21	new
SP	Anjana Walia	490	0.13	new
NOTA	None of the above	2,359	0.67	new
Spoiled ballots	Invalid	13,957	3.98	new
Majority		35,632	10.17	▼1.48
Turnout		3,50,101	55.71	
BJP hold		Swing		

== Position of the house ==
Dehradun Municipal Corporation
Party	Won	+/−
Bharatiya Janata Party (BJP)	60	▲26
Indian National Congress (INC)	34	▲12
Independents	6	▲4
Total	100	▲40

== See also ==
- 2018 Uttarakhand local elections
- 2019 Roorkee Municipal Corporation election
