= 2008 Uttarakhand local elections =

Local elections in India

2008 Uttarakhand municipal general elections
- March–April 2008
- Turnout: 60%

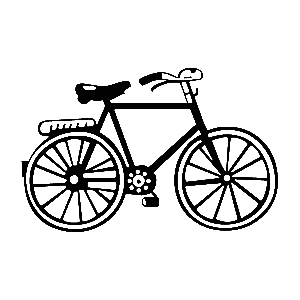

	First party	Second party	Third party
Leader	Bachi Singh Rawat	Yashpal Arya	Narayan Pal
Party	BJP	INC	BSP
Leader since	2007	2007	2007
Seats won	195	152	13
	Fourth party	Fifth party	Sixth party
Leader		Diwakar Bhatt	none
Party	SP	UKD	Independent
Leader since		2007
Seats won	6	5	322

2008 Uttarakhand panchayat general elections
- July–September 2008
	First party
Leader	none
Party	Independent
Seats won	10685

The 2008 Uttarakhand Municipal general elections and 2008 Uttarakhand Panchayat general elections were held in the Indian state of Uttarakhand.

Elections are not held in the nagar panchayats of Badrinath, Kedarnath and Gangotri due to their status of temporary settlements. Local interim administration councils administer these three pilgrimage sites for a period of six months during the summers.

== Results ==
=== Municipal Corporation Mayoral result ===
Municipal Corporation Mayoral result
S. No.	Municipal Corporation	District	Winner	Party	Runner-up	Party	Margin
1	Dehradun Municipal Corporation	Dehradun	Vinod Chamoli	Bharatiya Janata Party	Rajni Rawat	Independent	16,573

=== Municipal general election results ===
Municipal general election results
Party	Mayors/Chairpersons		Corporators/Ward Members		Total	
Party	Seats	+/-	Seats	+/-	Seats	+/-
Bharatiya Janata Party	18		177		195	
Indian National Congress	17		135		152	
Bahujan Samaj Party	3		10		13	
Uttarakhand Kranti Dal	0		6		6	
Samajwadi Party	0		5		5	
Independents	22		300		322	
Total	60		633		693	

=== Panchayat general election results ===
Panchayat general election results
District	Members of District Councils		Members of Block Councils		Presidents of Village Councils	
District	Seats	+/-	Seats	+/-	Seats	+/-
Almora	48		405		1146	
Bageshwar	19		120		397	
Chamoli	27		249		601	
Champawat	15		130		290	
Dehradun	33		240		403	
Haridwar	No elections were held in Haridwar district					
Nainital	26		257		460	
Pauri Garhwal	49		432		1208	
Pithoragarh	35		299		669	
Rudraprayag	19		116		323	
Tehri Garhwal	45		350		979	
Udham Singh Nagar	32		273		309	
Uttarkashi	23		204		454	
Total	371		3075		7239	

== See also ==
- 2008 Dehradun Municipal Corporation election
- 2008 elections in India
