= Haldwani (disambiguation) =

Haldwani is a city in the Indian state of Uttarakhand.

Haldwani may also refer to:

- Haldwani railway station, a main railway station located in Haldwani
- Haldwani Municipal Corporation, the civic body that governs the city of Haldwani
- Haldwani (Uttarakhand Assembly constituency), one of the seventy electoral Uttarakhand Legislative Assembly constituencies of Uttarakhand state in India
