= 2003 Dehradun Municipal Corporation election =

Local election in India

Coordinates: 30.3157°N 78.0336°E

All 60 seats in the Dehradun Municipal Corporation 31 seats needed for a majority

	Majority party	Minority party	Third party
Leader	Manorama Dobriyal Sharma	Vinod Uniyal	Sushila Baluni
Party	INC	BJP	UKD
Seats won	23	16	0
Mayor before election
office created
Elected mayor
Manorama Dobriyal Sharma
INC

The 2003 Dehradun Municipal Corporation election was a municipal election to the Dehradun Municipal Corporation, which governs Dehradun, the largest city in Uttarakhand.

2003 Dehradun Municipal Corporation election: Mayor
Party	Candidate	Votes	%	±%
INC	Manorama Dobriyal Sharma	50,511	34.29	
BJP	Vinod Uniyal	46,202	30.40	
UKD	Sushila Baluni	34,034	23.10	
BSP	Sushila Baluni	5,824	3.95	
Independent	Tara Devi	2,426	1.65	
JD(U)	Indubala	1,912	1.30	
Spoiled ballots	Invalid	6,361	4.31	
Majority		4,309	2.93	
Turnout		1,47,656		
INC win (new seat)				

== Position of the house ==
Dehradun Municipal Corporation
Party	Won	+/−
Indian National Congress (INC)	23	
Bharatiya Janata Party (BJP)	16	
Independents	6	
Total	45	Steady
