= Rajni Rawat =

Indian politician

Rajni Rawat is the first transgender politician in Uttarakhand, India. She served as the Vice president of Women Empowerment & Child Development (Women Commission, Uttarakhand).

== Elections contested ==
=== Uttarakhand Legislative Assembly ===
Year	Constituency	Result	Vote percentage	Opposition Candidate	Opposition Party	Opposition vote percentage	Ref
2017	Dharampur	Lost	0.51%	Vinod Chamoli	BJP	50.96%	
2017	Raipur	Lost	7.74%	Umesh Sharma 'Kau'	BJP	61.08%	

=== Dehradun Municipal Corporation ===
Year	Post	Result	Vote Percentage	Opposition Candidate	Opposition Party	Opposition Vote Percentage
2008	Mayor	Lost	24.06%	Vinod Chamoli	BJP	33.07%
2013	Mayor	Lost	23.73%	Vinod Chamoli	BJP	40.93%
2018	Mayor	Lost	8.27%	Sunil Uniyal 'Gama'	BJP	46.41%
