= 2008 Dehradun Municipal Corporation election =

Local election in India

Coordinates: 30.3157°N 78.0336°E

All 60 seats in the Dehradun Municipal Corporation 31 seats needed for a majority

	Majority party	Minority party	Third party
Leader	Vinod Chamoli	Surat Singh Negi	Mohammad Zameer
Party	BJP	INC	BSP
Leader's seat	28	24	1
Swing	▲12	▲1	▲1
	Fourth party	Fifth party
Leader	Vivekanand Khanduri	none
Party	UKD	Independent
Leader's seat	1	6
Swing	▲1	Steady
Mayor before election
Manorama Dobriyal Sharma
INC
Elected mayor
Vinod Chamoli
BJP

The 2008 Dehradun Municipal Corporation election was a municipal election to the Dehradun Municipal Corporation, which governs Dehradun, the largest city in Uttarakhand.

Vinod Chamoli of the Bharatiya Janata Party was elected mayor. The BJP won 28 of the 60 seats, and the Indian National Congress won 24.

== Mayoral election ==
2008 Dehradun Municipal Corporation election: Mayor
Party	Candidate	Votes	%	±%
BJP	Vinod Chamoli	60,867	33.07	
Independent	Rajni Rawat	44,294	24.06	
INC	Surat Singh Negi	40,642	22.08	
UKD	Vivekanand Khanduri	17,116	9.30	
BSP	Mohammad Zameer	10,276	5.58	
Independent	Anjula Karki	2,984	1.62	
Independent	Aman Singh Pundir	2,228	1.21	
Independent	Sanjay Goyal	1,590	0.86	
SP	Subhash Panwar	1,357	0.74	
Independent	Manju Sharma	1,207	0.66	
JD(S)	Manmohan Singh Negi	668	0.36	
Independent	Azizur Rahman	444	0.24	
Independent	Prabhakar Uniyal	389	0.21	
Majority		16,573	9.00	
Turnout		1,84,062		
BJP gain from INC		Swing		

== Position of the house ==
Dehradun Municipal Corporation
Party	Won	+/−
Bharatiya Janata Party (BJP)	28	▲12
Indian National Congress (INC)	24	▲1
Bahujan Samaj Party (BSP)	1	▲1
Uttarakhand Kranti Dal (UKD)	1	▲1
Independents	6	Steady
Total	60	

== See also ==
- 2008 Uttarakhand local elections
