= Rishikesh Municipal Corporation =

Civic body that governs the city of Rishikesh in Uttarakhand, India

Rishikesh Municipal Corporation ऋषिकेश नगर निगम Rishikesh Nagar Nigam
- Unicameral Legislature

Type
- Type: Municipal Corporation

Leadership
- Mayor: Shambhu Paswan, BJP since 7 February 2025
- Municipal Commissioner: Shailendra Singh Negi, PCS

Structure
- Seats: 40
- Political groups: Government (34): BJP (19); IND (15); Opposition (6): INC (6)

Elections
- Voting system: First-past-the-post
- Last election: 23 January 2025
- Next election: 2030

Meeting place
- Nagar Nigam Bhavan, Rishikesh

Website
- Nagar Nigam Rishikesh

The Rishikesh Municipal Corporation is the civic body that governs the city of Rishikesh in Uttarakhand, India.

== Structure ==
This corporation consists of 40 wards and is headed by a mayor who presides over a deputy mayor and 39 other corporators representing the wards. The mayor is elected directly through a first-past-the-post voting system and the deputy mayor is elected by the corporators from among their numbers.

== List of mayors ==
S. No.	Name	Term			Party
1	Anita Mamgain	2 December 2018	3 December 2023	5 years, 1 day	Bharatiya Janata Party
Administrator		3 December 2023	6 February 2025	1 year, 66 days	Government of Uttarakhand
2	Shambhu Paswan	7 February 2025	Incumbent	1 year, 113 days	Bharatiya Janata Party

== Current members ==
Rishikesh Municipal Corporation has a total of 40 members or corporators, who are directly elected after a term of 5 years. The council is led by the Mayor. The latest elections were held in 23 January 2025. The current mayor of Rishikesh is Shambhu Paswan of the Bharatiya Janata Party.

Mayor: Shambhu Paswan
Ward No	Ward Name	Name of Corporator	Party	Remarks
1	Chandreshwar Nagar	Kiran Yadav	Bharatiya Janata Party	
2	Triveni Colony	Roopa Devi	Bharatiya Janata Party	
3	Durga Mandir	Priyanka Yadav	Bharatiya Janata Party	
4	Bhairav Mandir	Pooja Nautiyal	Bharatiya Janata Party	
5	Pushkar Mandir	Devendra Kumar Prajapati	Indian National Congress	
6	Adarshgram	Chetan Chauhan	Independent	
7	Mayakund	Ajay Kumar Dass	Bharatiya Janata Party	
8	Bharat Mandir	Madhavi Gupta	Independent	
9	Mukherjee Marg	Reena	Bharatiya Janata Party	
10	Sadanand Marg	Anshu Dang	Bharatiya Janata Party	
11	Ashutosh Nagar	Bhagwan Singh Panwar	Indian National Congress	
12	Pragati Vihar	Sarojini Thapliyal	Indian National Congress	
13	Valmiki Nagar	Meghna	Indian National Congress	
14	Subhash Nagar	Simran	Independent	
15	Maniram Marg	Prabhakar Sharma	Bharatiya Janata Party	
16	Tilak Marg	Prince Dharmesh Manchanda	Independent	
17	Ganga Vihar	Ram Kumar Sangar	Independent	
18	Shanti Nagar	Rajesh Kumar	Bharatiya Janata Party	
19	Someshwar Mandir	Payal Bisht	Bharatiya Janata Party	
20	Ganga Nagar	Sandhya Bisht Goyal	Bharatiya Janata Party	
21	Upper Ganganagar	Sunita Bhardwaj	Independent	
22	Shastri Nagar	Reha Sanjay Dhyani	Bharatiya Janata Party	
23	Sarvahara Nagar	Veer Pal	Indian National Congress	
24	Bharat Vihar	Tanu Vikas Tewatia	Bharatiya Janata Party	
25	Awas Vikas	Jyoti Ashok Paswan	Bharatiya Janata Party	
26	Shivaji Nagar	Surendra Singh Negi	Independent	
27	Bairaj Marg	Abhinav Singh	Indian National Congress	
28	Veerbhadra Mandir	Luv Kamboj	Independent	
29	Bees Bigha	Sachvir Singh Bhandari	Independent	
30	Meeranagar	Harshvardhan Rawat	Independent	
31	Bapugram	Muskan	Bharatiya Janata Party	Defected to BJP
32	Suman Vihar	Anil Rawat	Independent	
33	Geeta Nagar	Dinesh Singh Rawat	Independent	
34	Malviya Nagar	Rajesh Kothiyal	Bharatiya Janata Party	
35	Amitgram East	Satya Prakash	Independent	
36	Amitgram West	Virendra Singh Ramola	Bharatiya Janata Party	
37	Manasa Devi	Vinod Nath	Independent	
38	Indira Nagar	Rajendra Bisht	Bharatiya Janata Party	
39	Nehrugram	Sanjay Bisht	Independent	
40	THDC	Pushkar Bangwal	Bharatiya Janata Party	

== Election results ==
The Rishikesh Municipal Corporation holds direct elections every five years in the state and the latest elections were those held in the year 2025.

=== Mayoral ===
Year	No. of Wards	Winner				Runner Up				Margin
Year	No. of Wards	Party	Candidate	Votes	%	Party	Candidate	Votes	%	Margin
2025	40	Bharatiya Janata Party	Shambhu Paswan	23,998	41.38	Independent	Dinesh Chandra	20,978	36.17	3,020

=== Ward-wise ===
==== 2025 ====
Rishikesh Municipal Corporation
Party	Won	+/−
Bharatiya Janata Party	18	▲3
Independents	16	Steady
Indian National Congress	6	▼3
Total	40	

== See also ==
- 2025 Rishikesh Municipal Corporation election
