= 2025 Haridwar Municipal Corporation election =

Election to the municipal corporation of Haridwar

- 23 January 2025

All 60 seats in the Haridwar Municipal Corporation 31 seats needed for a majority

	Majority party	Minority party	Third party
Leader	Kiran Jaisal	Amresh Baliyan	None
Party	BJP	INC	Independent
Last election	33	18	8
Seats won	40	15	5
Seat change	▲7	▼3	▼3
Mayor before election
Anita Sharma
INC
Elected mayor
Kiran Jaisal
BJP

The 2025 Haridwar Municipal Corporation election was a municipal election to the Haridwar Municipal Corporation which governs Haridwar city in Uttarakhand. It took place on 23 January 2025.

== Election schedule ==
The election schedule was announced by the state election commission on 23 December 2024.

Poll Event	Schedule
Notification Date	27 December 2024
Last Date for filing nomination	30 December 2024
Scrutiny of nomination	31 December 2024
Last Date for Withdrawal of nomination	2 January 2025
Allotment of Symbols	3 January 2025
Date of Poll	23 January 2025
Date of Counting of Votes	25 January 2025

== Candidates ==
=== Mayoral election ===
No.	Party	Symbol	Candidate's Name
1	Bharatiya Janata Party		Kiran Jaisal
2	Indian National Congress		Amresh Baliyan

=== Ward-wise candidates ===
Ward No.	Ward Name				
Ward No.	Ward Name	BJP		INC	
1	Saptarishi	BJP	Akash Bhati	INC	Vikas Gupta
2	Bhupatwala	BJP	Sunita Sharma	INC	Sita Devi
3	Durga Nagar	BJP	Suryakant Sharma	INC	Bharat Giri
4	Kharkhari	BJP	Aniruddh Bhati	INC	Rishabh Vashisht
5	Shri Gangadhar Mahadev Nagar	BJP	Anil Vashisht	INC	Satish Gujral
6	Bhimgora	BJP	Sumit Chaudhary	INC	Kailash Bhatut
7	Har Ki Pauri	BJP	Shruti Khevadia	INC	Anju Thakur
8	Gaughat	BJP	Himanshu Advani	INC	Himanshu Gupta
9	Brahmpuri	BJP	Nishant Verma	INC	Sohit Sethi
10	Bilkeshwar	BJP	Sachin Kumar	INC	Nikhil Saudai
11	Shrawan Nath Nagar	BJP	Deepak Sharma	INC	Rajeev Bhargav
12	Nirmala Cantonment	BJP	Ishtadev Soni	INC	Deepak Kapoor
13	Mayapur	BJP	Manju Rawat	INC	Rekha Rani
14	Rishikul	BJP	Lalit Rawat	INC	Kiran Bhatia
15	Vivek Vihar	BJP	Siddharth Kaushik	INC	Vivek Bhushan
16	Shivlok	BJP	Nisha Naudiyal	INC	Krishna Devi
17	Tibri	BJP	Rani Devi	INC	Vandana Kumar
18	Govindpuri	BJP	Mamata Negi	INC	Tanisha Gupta
19	Khanna Nagar	BJP	Monika Saini	INC	Ayushi Tandon
20	Awas Vikas	BJP	Rajesh Sharma	INC	Vishal Agarwal
21	Sharda Nagar	BJP	Pinki Chaudhary	INC	Kamlesh Bhardwaj
22	Aryanagar	BJP	Sapna Sharma	INC	Parvati Negi
23	Ramnagar	BJP	Ashi Bhardwaj	INC	Shalu Ahuja
24	Krishna Nagar	BJP	P.S. Gill	INC	Gagandeep Singh
25	Acharayan	BJP	Ekta Gupta	INC	Deepika Lohri
26	Sandesh Nagar	BJP	Shubham Mendola	INC	Anshu Srivastava
27	Latowali	BJP	Sunil Agarwal	INC	Mohit Tyagi
28	Rajghat	BJP	Mukul Parashar	INC	Neha Sharma
29	Kumhar Garha	BJP	Prashant Saini	INC	Harsh Lodhi
30	Chowk Bazaar	BJP	Sachin Agarwal	INC	Chandra Mohan Chauhan
31	Ravidas Basti	BJP	Bhupendra Kumar	INC	Aishcharya Pant
32	Nathnagar	BJP	Anuj Singh	INC	Vijay Sharma
33	Shastri Nagar	BJP	Rajendra Kataria	INC	Sunil Kumar Singh
34	Ambedkar Nagar	BJP	Nisha Pundir	INC	Shivdutt Kumar
35	Kadachh	BJP	Deepali	INC	Anju Kumar
36	Teliyan	BJP	Monika Gihar	INC	Kamlesh Kumar
37	Katorawan	BJP	Rehman	INC	Nauman Ansari
38	Mehtan	BJP	Annu Mehta	INC	Parag Mishra
39	Lodha Mandi	BJP	Tanija Prajapati	INC	Shabana
40	Peeth Bazaar	BJP	Monika Verma	INC	Anjum Qureshi
41	Kassawan	BJP	Naseem Samrani	INC	Arshad Khwaja
42	Valmiki Basti	BJP	Chetna	INC	Kritika
43	Paodhoi	BJP	Harvinder	INC	Nasir
44	Trimurti Nagar	BJP	Sanjeev Saini	INC	Shaukat Ali
45	Tapovan Nagar	BJP	Yogendra Saini	INC	Mohammad Shahzad
46	Neelkhudana	BJP	Sandeep Saini	INC	Khursheeda Ahmad
47	Pandewala	BJP	Kiran Prakash Verma	INC	Rajendra Yadav
48	Chaklana	BJP	Ashutosh Chakrapani	INC	Sheel Sharma
49	Lakkadharan	BJP	Babita Sharma	INC	Kiran Kaushik
50	Maidanian	BJP	Sudeshana	INC	Neelofar Ansari
51	Ghosian	BJP	Neetu Kashyap	INC	Nasreen Begum
52	Ahvab Nagar	BJP	Sunil Kumar Pandey	INC	Abdesh Kumar
53	Vishnu Lok	BJP	Hitesh Chaudhary	INC	Vijay Kumar
54	Gurukul	BJP	Nagendra Singh Rana	INC	Udaiveer Chauhan
55	Shivpuri	BJP	Vikas Kumar	INC	Ved Prakash Jyotishacharya
56	Hanumantpuram	BJP	Yadram Walia	INC	Sanjay Dhiman
57	Jagjeetpur	BJP	Manoj Puraliya	INC	Mahesh Chandra
58	Raja Garden	BJP	Vimla Dhaudiyal	INC	Sumit Tyagi
59	Sitapur	BJP	Vineet Chauhan	INC	Priti Sharma
60	Harilok	BJP	Sandeep Sharma	INC	Shubham Chauhan

== Results ==
=== Mayoral election ===
2025 Haridwar Municipal Corporation Election: Mayor
Party	Candidate	Votes	%	±%
BJP	Kiran Jaisal	72,773	57.86	▲12.07
INC	Amresh Baliyan	44,203	35.15	▼13.46
AAP	Shipra Saini	4,056	3.22	New
BSP	Usman	2,870	2.28	New
Independent	Afroza	1,285	1.02	New
NOTA	None of the above	586	0.47	▼0.03
Majority		28,570	22.71	▲19.89
Turnout		1,25,773	65.51	
BJP gain from INC		Swing	▲12.07	

=== Results by party ===
Party	Seats		
Party	Contested	Won	+/−
Bharatiya Janata Party	59	40	▲7
Indian National Congress	59	15	▼3
Other parties	32	0	▼1 (Note: BSP lost a seat it had won in 2018.)
Independents	58	5	▼3
NOTA			
Total	208	60	

== See also ==
- 2025 Uttarakhand local elections
- 2013 Haridwar Municipal Corporation election
- 2025 Dehradun Municipal Corporation election
- 2025 Roorkee Municipal Corporation election
- 2025 Pithoragarh Municipal Corporation election
- 2025 Haldwani Municipal Corporation election
- 2025 Rudrapur Municipal Corporation election
- 2025 Kotdwar Municipal Corporation election
- 2025 Rishikesh Municipal Corporation election
- 2025 Almora Municipal Corporation election
- 2025 Kashipur Municipal Corporation election
- 2025 Srinagar Municipal Corporation election
