= 2025 Kashipur Municipal Corporation election =

Election to the municipal corporation of Kashipur

- 23 January 2025

All 40 seats in the Kashipur Municipal Corporation 21 seats needed for a majority

	Majority party	Minority party	Third party
Leader	Deepak Bali	Sandeep Sehgal	None
Party	BJP	INC	Independent
Last election	15	7	16
Seats won	19	8	13
Seat change	▲4	▲1	▼3
Mayor before election
Usha Chaudhary
BJP
Elected mayor
Deepak Bali
BJP

The 2025 Kashipur Municipal Corporation election was a municipal election to the Kashipur Municipal Corporation which governs Kashipur city. It took place on 23 January 2025.

== Election schedule ==
The election schedule was announced by the state election commission on 23 December 2024.

Poll Event	Schedule
Notification Date	27 December 2024
Last Date for filing nomination	30 December 2024
Scrutiny of nomination	31 December 2024
Last Date for Withdrawal of nomination	2 January 2025
Allotment of Symbols	3 January 2025
Date of Poll	23 January 2025
Date of Counting of Votes	25 January 2025

== Candidates ==
=== Mayoral election ===
No.	Party	Symbol	Candidate's Name
1	Bharatiya Janata Party		Deepak Bali
2	Indian National Congress		Sandeep Sehgal

== Results ==
=== Mayoral election ===
2025 Kashipur Municipal Corporation Election: Mayor
Party	Candidate	Votes	%	±%
BJP	Deepak Bali	49,137	47.20%	▼0.77
INC	Sandeep Sehgal	43,979	42.24%	▲0.21
BSP	Haseen Khan	2,618	2.51%	▲0.14
SP	Nadeem Akhtar	917	0.88%	▼0.62
NOTA	None of the above	391	0.38%	▼0.57
Majority		5,158	4.96%	▼0.96
Turnout		1,04,106		
BJP hold		Swing		

=== Results by party ===
Party	Popular vote			Seats		
Party	Votes	%	±pp	Contested	Won	+/−
Bharatiya Janata Party					19	▲4
Indian National Congress					8	▲1
Other parties					0	▼2
Independents					13	▼3
NOTA						
Total		100%			40	

== See also ==
- 2025 Uttarakhand local elections
- 2025 Dehradun Municipal Corporation election
- 2025 Roorkee Municipal Corporation election
- 2025 Haridwar Municipal Corporation election
- 2025 Haldwani Municipal Corporation election
- 2025 Rudrapur Municipal Corporation election
- 2025 Kotdwar Municipal Corporation election
- 2025 Rishikesh Municipal Corporation election
- 2025 Almora Municipal Corporation election
- 2025 Pithoragarh Municipal Corporation election
- 2025 Srinagar Municipal Corporation election
