= 2025 Rishikesh Municipal Corporation election =

Election to the municipal corporation of Rishikesh

- 23 January 2025

All 40 seats in the Rishikesh Municipal Corporation 21 seats needed for a majority

	Majority party	Minority party	Third party
Leader	Shambhu Paswan	Deepak Jatav	None
Party	BJP	INC	Independent
Last election	15	9	16
Seats won	18	6	16
Seat change	▲3	▼3	Steady
Mayor before election
Anita Mamgain
BJP
Elected mayor
Shambhu Paswan
BJP

The 2025 Rishikesh Municipal Corporation election was a municipal election to the Rishikesh Municipal Corporation which governs Rishikesh city in Uttarakhand. It took place on 23 January 2025.

== Election schedule ==
The election schedule was announced by the state election commission on 23 December 2024.

Poll Event	Schedule
Notification Date	27 December 2024
Last Date for filing nomination	30 December 2024
Scrutiny of nomination	31 December 2024
Last Date for Withdrawal of nomination	2 January 2025
Allotment of Symbols	3 January 2025
Date of Poll	23 January 2025
Date of Counting of Votes	25 January 2025

== Candidates ==
=== Mayoral ===
No.	Party	Symbol	Candidate's Name
1	Bharatiya Janata Party		Shambhu Paswan
2	Indian National Congress		Deepak Jatav
3	Uttarakhand Kranti Dal		Mahendra Singh
4	Independent		Dinesh Chandra

=== Ward-wise candidates ===
Ward No.	Ward Name				
Ward No.	Ward Name	BJP		INC	
1	Chandreshwar Nagar	BJP	Kiran Yadav	INC	Pushpa Mishra
2	Triveni Colony	BJP	Rupa Devi	INC	Rina Bhardwaj
3	Durga Mandir	BJP	Priyanka Yadav	INC	Urmila Devi
4	Bhairav Mandir	BJP	Puja Nautiyal	INC	Suman Rani
5	Pushkar Mandir	BJP	Shiva Prajapati	INC	Devendra Prajapati
6	Adarsh Gram	BJP	Gambhir Mewar	INC	Sunil Kumar
7	Mayakund	BJP	Ajay Kumar Das	INC	Vishal Singh
8	Bharat Mandir	BJP	Vijay Lakshmi Bhatt	INC	
9	Mukherjee Marg	BJP	Rina Sharma	INC	Rahul Sharma
10	Sadanand Marg	BJP	Ashwani Dang	INC	Manish Sharma
11	Ashutosh Nagar	BJP	Sumit Tiwari	INC	Bhagwan Singh Panwar
12	Pragati Vihar	BJP	Rajendra Bijlwan	INC	Sarojini Thapliyal
13	Valmiki Nagar	BJP	Ekta Khairwal	INC	Meghna
14	Subhash Bankhandi	BJP	Lata Tiwari	INC	
15	Maniram Marg	BJP	Prabhakar Sharma	INC	Kuldeep Sharma
16	Tilak Marg	BJP	Pradip Kohli	INC	
17	Ganga Vihar	BJP	Shiv Kumar Gautam	INC	Kamlesh Sharma
18	Shanti Nagar	BJP	Rajesh Kumar	INC	Ajay Diwakar
19	Someshwar Mandir	BJP	Payal Bisht	INC	Radha Devi
20	Ganga Nagar	BJP	Sandhya Bisht	INC	
21	Upper Ganga Nagar	BJP	Nilam Manori	INC	
22	Shastri Nagar	BJP	Rekha Dhyani	INC	Sunita Bansal
23	Sarvahara Nagar	BJP	Vikas Tewatia	INC	Vir Pal
24	Bharat Vihar	BJP	Tanu Tewatia	INC	Lajwanti Bhandari
25	Awas Vikas Colony	BJP	Jyoti Paswan	INC	Urmila Dimri
26	Shivaji Nagar	BJP	Jayesh Rana	INC	Gurvinder Singh
27	Barrage	BJP	Devendra Prasad Dimri	INC	Abhinav Singh Malik
28	Virbhadra	BJP	Rahul Kashyap	INC	Rakesh Rajbhar
29	Bis Bigha	BJP	Vimal Singh Negi	INC	Sachvir Bhandari
30	Mira Nagar	BJP	Anita Pradhan	INC	
31	Bapu Gram	BJP	Manju Devi	INC	Sakshi
32	Suman Vihar	BJP	Govind Singh Rawat	INC	Bhupendra Kukreti
33	Gita Nagar	BJP	Vijay Badoni	INC	
34	Malviya Nagar	BJP	Rajesh Kothiyal	INC	Sumit Chauhan
35	Amit Gram East	BJP	Vipin Pant	INC	Arvind Negi
36	Amit Gram West	BJP	Vijay Jugran	INC	
37	Mansha Devi	BJP	Vijendra Mogha	INC	Manoj Barthwal
38	Indira Nagar	BJP	Rajendra Singh Bisht	INC	
39	Nehru Gram	BJP	Jagat Singh Negi	INC	
40	THDC Colony	BJP	Pushkar Bangwal	INC	Moni Dirwal

== Results ==
=== Mayoral election ===
2025 Rishikesh Municipal Corporation Election: Mayor
Party	Candidate	Votes	%	±%
BJP	Shambhu Paswan	23,998	41.38	
Independent	Dinesh Chandra	20,978	36.17	
INC	Deepak Jatav	11,955	20.61	
UKD	Mahendra Singh	759	1.31	
NOTA	None of the above	303	0.52	
Majority		3,020	5.21	
Turnout		57,993		
BJP hold		Swing		

=== Results by party ===
Party	Seats		
Party	Contested	Won	+/−
Bharatiya Janata Party	40	18	▲3
Indian National Congress	30	6	▼3
Uttarakhand Kranti Dal	5	0	Steady
Aam Aadmi Party	1	0	Steady
Bahujan Samaj Party	1	0	Steady
Independents	69	16	Steady
Total	144	40	

== See also ==
- 2025 Uttarakhand local elections
- 2025 Dehradun Municipal Corporation election
- 2025 Roorkee Municipal Corporation election
- 2025 Haridwar Municipal Corporation election
- 2025 Haldwani Municipal Corporation election
- 2025 Rudrapur Municipal Corporation election
- 2025 Kotdwar Municipal Corporation election
- 2025 Pithoragarh Municipal Corporation election
- 2025 Almora Municipal Corporation election
- 2025 Kashipur Municipal Corporation election
- 2025 Srinagar Municipal Corporation election
