= Srinagar Municipal Corporation (Uttarakhand) =

Civic body that governs the town of Srinagar in Uttarakhand, India

Srinagar Municipal Corporation श्रीनगर नगर निगम Srinagar Nagar Nigam
- Unicameral Legislature

Type
- Type: Municipal Corporation

Leadership
- Mayor: Arti Bhandari, Independent since 7 February 2025
- Municipal Commissioner: Nupur Sharma, PCS

Structure
- Seats: 40
- Political groups: Government (18): IND (18); Opposition (22): BJP (16); INC (6)

Elections
- Voting system: First-past-the-post
- Last election: 23 January 2025
- Next election: 2030

Meeting place
- Sri Bhavan, Sringar (proposed)

The Srinagar Municipal Corporation is the civic body that governs the city of Srinagar in Uttarakhand, India.

== Structure ==
This corporation consists of 40 wards and is headed by a mayor who presides over a deputy mayor and 39 other corporators representing the wards. The mayor is elected directly through a first-past-the-post voting system and the deputy mayor is elected by the corporators from among their numbers.

== List of mayors ==
S. No.	Name	Term			Party
1	Arti Bhandari	7 February 2025	Incumbent	1 year, 247 days	Independent

== Current members ==
Srinagar Municipal Corporation has a total of 40 members or corporators, who are directly elected after a term of 5 years. The council is led by the Mayor. The latest elections were held in 23 January 2025. The current mayor of Srinagar, Uttarakhand is Independent politician Arti Bhandari, who was also a BJP-rebel candidate.

Mayor: Arti Bhandari
Ward No	Ward Name	Name of Corporator	Party	Remarks
1	Haddy May Dungripanth	Rajendra Singh	Bharatiya Janata Party	
2	Farasu May Koteshwar	Vijay Kumar Chamoli	Independent	
3	Swit May Gahad	Usha Devi	Bharatiya Janata Party	
4	Medical College Corridor Road	Kusumlata Bisht	Independent	
5	Base Hospital	Pooja Barthawal	Independent	
6	Lingwal Market May Tolyusain	Bhavna Chauhan	Independent	
7	Shivalay May Krishna Mandir	Guddi Devi	Bharatiya Janata Party	
8	Nagaraja Sain	Meena Devi	Independent	
9	Tolyusain May Kandai	Sunita Gairola	Bharatiya Janata Party	
10	Revdi Ghasia Mahadev	Ashish Negi	Independent	
11	Dam Colony May Kothad	Anjana Dobhal	Bharatiya Janata Party	
12	Agency Mohalla May Kevat Mohalla	Shubham Kumar Prabhakar	Bharatiya Janata Party	
13	Banswada May Brahman Mohalla	Anjani Bhandari	Independent	
14	Upper Bazaar	Devendra Mani	Bharatiya Janata Party	
15	Thana Marg May Alaknanda Vihar	Anurag Chauhan	Indian National Congress	
16	Pragati Vihar-1	Raj Kumar	Indian National Congress	
17	Pragati Vihar-2	Rekha Devi	Indian National Congress	
18	Ganesh Bazaar May Ramlila Maidan	Jhabar Singh Rawat	Bharatiya Janata Party	
19	Bhagirathipuram	Rashmi	Indian National Congress	
20	Kalyaneshwar Mandir May Sabzi Mandi	Ujjwal Agarwal	Bharatiya Janata Party	
21	Niranjani Baang May Dak Bungalow	Anjana Rawat	Independent	
22	Mistri Mohalla	Kusumlata	Indian National Congress	
23	Bajiro Ka Bagh May Highdeal Colony	Deepak	Bharatiya Janata Party	
24	Treasury Road May Tiwari Mohalla	Ramesh Ramola	Bharatiya Janata Party	
25	Glass House May University	Vikas Chauhan	Independent	
26	Kamleshwar Baghwan	Suraj Negi	Indian National Congress	
27	Kedar Mohalla May Central School	Meena Aswal	Bharatiya Janata Party	
28	Ragda Baghwan May Amrakanj	Jaipal Singh	Independent	
29	Upper Bhaktiyana May Sheetal Mata	Pooja Kimothi	Independent	
30	Shakti Vihar Polytechnic	Himanshu Bahuguna	Bharatiya Janata Party	
31	Chauhan Mohalla May Fatehpureti	Sumit Singh Bisht	Independent	
32	Aithana Dang-1	Pankaj Kumar Sati	Bharatiya Janata Party	
33	Aithana Dang-2	Akshitesh Naithani	Independent	
34	Aithana Dang-3	Dinesh Singh	Bharatiya Janata Party	
35	Aithana Dang-4	Pravesh Chandra Chamoli	Independent	
36	Aithana Dang-5	Pradeep Rana	Independent	
37	Anchal Dairy May Sinchai Vibhag	Dharma Singh Rawat	Independent	
38	Uphalda Upper	Narendra Singh Rawat	Independent	
39	Uphalda-2	Surendra Kumar	Bharatiya Janata Party	
40	Vaidyagaon May Nakot	Sandeep Singh Rawat	Independent	

== Election results ==
The Srinagar Municipal Corporation holds direct elections every five years in the state and the latest elections were those held in the year 2025.

=== Mayoral ===
Year	No. of Wards	Winner				Runner Up				Margin
Year	No. of Wards	Party	Candidate	Votes	%	Party	Candidate	Votes	%	Margin
2025	40	Independent (BJP rebel)	Arti Bhandari	7,956	41.12	Bharatiya Janata Party	Asha Upadhyay	6,317	32.17	1,639

=== Ward-wise ===
==== 2025 ====
Srinagar Municipal Corporation
Party	Won	+/−
Independents	18	New
Bharatiya Janata Party	16	New
Indian National Congress	6	New
Total	40	

== See also ==
- 2025 Srinagar Municipal Corporation election
