= 2025 Srinagar, Uttarakhand Municipal Corporation election =

Election to the municipal corporation of Srinagar, Uttarakhand

2025 Srinagar Municipal Corporation election
- 23 January 2025

All 40 seats in the Srinagar Municipal Corporation 21 seats needed for a majority

	Majority party	Minority party	Third party
Leader	Asha Upadhyay	Meena Rawat	None
Party	BJP	INC	Independent
Last election	New	New	New
Seats won	16	6	18
Seat change	New	New	New
Mayor before election
Office established
Elected mayor
Arti Bhandari
Independent

The 2025 Srinagar Municipal Corporation election was a municipal election to the Srinagar Municipal Corporation which governs Srinagar town in Uttarakhand. It took place on 23 January 2025.

== Election schedule ==
The election schedule was announced by the state election commission on 23 December 2024.

Poll Event	Schedule
Notification Date	27 December 2024
Last Date for filing nomination	30 December 2024
Scrutiny of nomination	31 December 2024
Last Date for Withdrawal of nomination	2 January 2025
Allotment of Symbols	3 January 2025
Date of Poll	23 January 2025
Date of Counting of Votes	25 January 2025

== Candidates ==
=== Mayoral ===
No.	Party	Symbol	Candidate's Name
1	Bharatiya Janata Party		Asha Upadhyay
2	Indian National Congress		Meena Rawat

== Results ==
=== Mayoral election ===
2025 Srinagar Municipal Corporation Election: Mayor
Party	Candidate	Votes	%	±%
Independent	Arti Bhandari	7,956	41.2	New
BJP	Asha Upadhyay	6,317	32.17	New
Independent	Poonam Tiwari	2,632	13.63	New
INC	Meena Rawat	2,075	10.74	New
Independent	Saraswati Devi	243	1.26	New
NOTA	None of the above	90	0.46	New
Majority		1,639	9.03	New
Turnout		19,313		
Independent win (new seat)				

=== Result by party ===
Party	Seats		
Party	Contested	Won	+/−
Independents	77	18	New
Bharatiya Janata Party	39	16	New
Indian National Congress	24	6	New
NOTA			
Total	140	40	

== See also ==
- 2025 Uttarakhand local elections
- 2025 Dehradun Municipal Corporation election
- 2025 Roorkee Municipal Corporation election
- 2025 Haridwar Municipal Corporation election
- 2025 Haldwani Municipal Corporation election
- 2025 Rudrapur Municipal Corporation election
- 2025 Kotdwar Municipal Corporation election
- 2025 Rishikesh Municipal Corporation election
- 2025 Almora Municipal Corporation election
- 2025 Kashipur Municipal Corporation election
- 2025 Pithoragarh Municipal Corporation election
