= Pithoragarh Municipal Corporation =

Civic body that governs the town of Pithoragarh in Uttarakhand, India

Pithoragarh Municipal Corporation पिथौरागढ़ नगर निगम Pithoragarh Nagar Nigam
- Unicameral Legislature

Type
- Type: Municipal Corporation

Leadership
- Mayor: Kalpana Deolal, BJP since 7 February 2025
- Municipal Commissioner: Deepak Saini, IAS

Structure
- Seats: 40
- Political groups: Government (5): BJP (5); Opposition (35): IND (35)

Elections
- Voting system: First-past-the-post
- Last election: 23 January 2025
- Next election: 2030

Meeting place
- Nagar Nigam Bhavan, Pithoragarh

Pithoragarh Municipal Corporation is the civic body that governs the city of Pithoragarh in Uttarakhand, India.

== Structure ==
This corporation consists of 40 wards and is headed by a mayor who presides over a deputy mayor and 39 other corporators representing the wards. The mayor is elected directly through a first-past-the-post voting system and the deputy mayor is elected by the corporators from among their numbers.

== List of mayors ==
S. No.	Name	Term			Party
1	Kalpana Deolal	7 February 2025	Incumbent	1 year, 232 days	Bharatiya Janata Party

== Current members ==
Pithoragarh Municipal Corporation has a total of 40 members or corporators, who are directly elected after a term of 5 years. The council is led by the Mayor. The latest elections were held in 23 January 2025. The current mayor of Pithoragarh is Kalpana Deolal of the Bharatiya Janata Party.

Mayor: Kalpana Deolal
Ward No	Ward Name	Name of Corporator	Party	Remarks
1	Bajeti	Hansi Prakash	Independent	
2	New Bajeti	Naveen Lal Verma	Independent	
3	Nirara	Trilok Singh Mahar	Independent	
4	Kumaour	Neetu Tamta	Independent	
5	Piyana	Rajendra Kumar	Independent	
6	Takana Colony	Vikram Kumar	Independent	
7	Shiv Vihar	Bhupendra Singh	Independent	
8	Linthyura	Rahul Singh Lunthi	Independent	
9	Jakhani	Mahendra Kumar	Independent	
10	Bin	Deepshikha Mehta	Independent	
11	Bhatkot	Derek Waston	Independent	
12	Rai	Mohit Chausali	Independent	
13	Pandegaon	Mamata Pandey	Independent	
14	Padampur Colony	Prithviraj Singh	Bharatiya Janata Party	
15	Bhadelwada	Kamlesh Chand	Independent	
16	Chandrabhaga	Lalita Joshi	Bharatiya Janata Party	
17	Dugkhani	Kamlesh Joshi	Independent	
18	New Tildhukri	Neeraj Kothari	Independent	
19	Krishnapuri	Ravindra Singh Bisht	Independent	
20	Jagdamba Colony	Mamata Saun	Independent	
21	Kujauli	Pushpa Upreti	Independent	
22	Jagriti Colony	Pawan Kumar Patani	Independent	
23	Shivalay	Anil Kumar Verma	Independent	
24	Purana Bazaar	Sushil Khatri	Independent	
25	Naya Bazaar	Karan Singh	Independent	
26	Simalgair	Neeraj Joshi	Independent	
27	Pitrauta	Krishna Verma	Independent	
28	Aincholi	Hema Joshi	Independent	
29	Panlot	Saurav Bhandari	Independent	
30	Daula	Sherin Nagarkoti	Independent	
31	Cinema Lines West	Renuka Joshi Mehra	Independent	
32	Cinema Lines East	Anshu Nagi	Bharatiya Janata Party	
33	Dhanaura	Bhavna Kapri	Bharatiya Janata Party	
34	Nera Basti	Dinesh Chandra Kapri	Bharatiya Janata Party	
35	Puneri	Shobha Punera	Independent	
36	Sera Chandak	Ravi Mehta	Independent	
37	Tildhukri	Jayanti Saun	Independent	
38	Malli Jakhani	Vijendra Singh Mahar	Independent	
39	Kharkot	Anil Kumar Joshi	Independent	
40	Vivekananda	Praveen Singh Uprari	Independent	

== Election results ==
The Pithoragarh Municipal Corporation holds direct elections every five years in the state and the latest elections were those held in the year 2025.

=== Mayoral ===
Year	No. of Wards	Winner				Runner Up				Margin
Year	No. of Wards	Party	Candidate	Votes	%	Party	Candidate	Votes	%	Margin
2025	40	Bharatiya Janata Party	Kalpana Deolal	9,466	39.35	Independent (INC rebel)	Monika Mahar	9,449	39.28	17

=== Ward-wise ===
==== 2025 ====
Pithoragarh Municipal Corporation
Party	Won	+/−
Bharatiya Janata Party	5	New
Independents	35	New
Total	40	

== See also ==
- 2025 Pithoragarh Municipal Corporation election
