= 2025 Rudrapur Municipal Corporation election =

Election to the municipal corporation of Rudrapur

- 23 January 2025

All 40 seats in the Rudrapur Municipal Corporation 21 seats needed for a majority

	Majority party	Minority party	Third party
Leader	Vikas Sharma	Mohan Khera	None
Party	BJP	INC	Independent
Last election	17	17	6
Seats won	21	14	5
Seat change	▲4	▼3	▼1
Mayor before election
Rampal Singh
BJP
Elected mayor
Vikas Sharma
BJP

The 2025 Rudrapur Municipal Corporation election was a municipal election to the Rudrapur Municipal Corporation which governs Rudrapur city. It took place on 23 January 2025.

== Election schedule ==
The election schedule was announced by the state election commission on 23 December 2024.

Poll Event	Schedule
Notification Date	27 December 2024
Last Date for filing nomination	30 December 2024
Scrutiny of nomination	31 December 2024
Last Date for Withdrawal of nomination	2 January 2025
Allotment of Symbols	3 January 2025
Date of Poll	23 January 2025
Date of Counting of Votes	25 January 2025

== Candidates ==
=== Mayoral ===
No.	Party	Symbol	Candidate's Name
1	Bharatiya Janata Party		Vikas Sharma
2	Indian National Congress		Mohan Khera

== Results ==
=== Mayoral election ===
2025 Rudrapur Municipal Corporation Election: Mayor
Party	Candidate	Votes	%	±%
BJP	Vikas Sharma	54,069	55.96	▲6.20
INC	Mohan Khera	41,148	42.59	▼0.76
SP	Imran Ahmed Ansari	498	0.51	▼0.22
Independent	Ajay Kumar	470	0.48	New
NOTA	None of the above	430	0.44	▼0.11
Majority		12,921	13.37	▲6.96
Turnout		96,615		
BJP hold		Swing	▲6.20	

=== Results by party ===
Party	Seats		
Party	Contested	Won	+/−
Bharatiya Janata Party	39	21	▲4
Indian National Congress	37	14	▼3
Aam Aadmi Party	4	0	Steady
Independents	39	5	▼5
NOTA			
Total	119	40	

== See also ==
- 2025 Uttarakhand local elections
- 2025 Dehradun Municipal Corporation election
- 2025 Roorkee Municipal Corporation election
- 2025 Haridwar Municipal Corporation election
- 2025 Haldwani Municipal Corporation election
- 2025 Pithoragarh Municipal Corporation election
- 2025 Kotdwar Municipal Corporation election
- 2025 Rishikesh Municipal Corporation election
- 2025 Almora Municipal Corporation election
- 2025 Kashipur Municipal Corporation election
- 2025 Srinagar Municipal Corporation election
