= Dharampur, Uttarakhand Assembly constituency =

Constituency of the Uttarakhand legislative assembly in India

Coordinates: 29.31°N 78.78°E

Dharampur
- Constituency No. 18 for the Uttarakhand Legislative Assembly

Constituency details
- Country: India
- Region: North India
- State: Uttarakhand
- District: Dehradun
- Lok Sabha constituency: Haridwar
- Total electors: 206,737 (2022)
- Reservation: None

Member of Legislative Assembly
- 5th Uttarakhand Legislative Assembly
- Incumbent Vinod Chamoli
- Party: Bhartya Janta Party
- Elected year: 2022

Dharampur Legislative Assembly constituency is one of the seventy electoral Uttarakhand Legislative Assembly constituencies of Uttarakhand state in India. In 2017 Vidhan Sabha election BJP won this seat from Congress and retained it in 2022.

Dharampur Legislative Assembly constituency is a part of Haridwar (Lok Sabha constituency). The constituency also covers 20 wards of the Dehradun Municipal Corporation.

== Members of the Legislative Assembly ==
Election	Member	Party
2012	Dinesh Agrawal	Indian National Congress
2017	Vinod Chamoli	Bharatiya Janata Party
2022	Vinod Chamoli	Bharatiya Janata Party

== Election results ==
=== 2027 Assembly election ===
2027 Uttarakhand Legislative Assembly election: Dharampur
Party	Candidate	Votes	%	±%
INC				
BJP				
NOTA	None of the above			
Majority				
Turnout				
gain from		Swing		

=== Assembly Election 2022 ===
2022 Uttarakhand Legislative Assembly election: Dharampur
Party	Candidate	Votes	%	±%
BJP	Vinod Chamoli	58,538	49.25%	▼1.41
INC	Dinesh Agrawal	48,448	40.76%	▲0.41
Independent	Beer Singh Panwar	5,206	4.38%	New
AAP	Yogendra Chauhan	3,162	2.66%	New
BSP	Lalit Thapa	706	0.59%	▼0.30
NOTA	None of the above	528	0.44%	▲0.09
Margin of victory		10,090	8.49%	▼1.82
Turnout		1,18,849	57.22%	▼0.34
Registered electors		2,07,718		▲12.54
BJP hold		Swing	▼1.41	

=== Assembly Election 2017 ===
2017 Uttarakhand Legislative Assembly election: Dharampur
Party	Candidate	Votes	%	±%
BJP	Vinod Chamoli	53,828	50.67%	▲12.84
INC	Dinesh Agrawal	42,875	40.36%	▼9.98
Independent	Noor Hassan	4,117	3.88%	New
BSP	Saleem Ahmed	951	0.90%	▼4.16
Independent	Jogendra Rawat	577	0.54%	New
Independent	Rajani Rawat	541	0.51%	New
NOTA	None of the above	377	0.35%	New
Margin of victory		10,953	10.31%	▼2.21
Turnout		1,06,239	57.56%	▼4.63
Registered electors		1,84,569		▲52.54
BJP gain from INC		Swing	▲0.33	

=== Assembly Election 2012 ===
2012 Uttarakhand Legislative Assembly election: Dharampur
Party	Candidate	Votes	%	±%
INC	Dinesh Agrawal	37,884	50.34%	New
BJP	Prakash Suman Dhyani	28,464	37.82%	New
BSP	Saleem Ahmed	3,805	5.06%	New
Independent	Mo. Tahir	976	1.30%	New
UKD	Bahadur Singh Rawat	948	1.26%	New
Independent	Mahesh Kumar	593	0.79%	New
BSP(K)	Ramsukh	379	0.50%	New
Margin of victory		9,420	12.52%	
Turnout		75,255	62.20%	
Registered electors		1,20,998		
INC win (new seat)				

== See also ==
- Lakshman Chowk (Uttarakhand Assembly constituency)
