= 2025 Almora Municipal Corporation election =

Election to the municipal corporation of Almora

- 23 January 2025

All 40 seats in the Almora Municipal Corporation 21 seats needed for a majority
	Majority party	Minority party
Leader	Ajay Verma	None
Party	BJP	Independent
Last election	New	New
Seats won	15	25
Seat change	New	New
Mayor before election
Office established
Elected mayor
Ajay Verma
BJP

The 2025 Almora Municipal Corporation election was a municipal election to the Almora Municipal Corporation which governs Almora city in Uttarakhand. It took place on 23 January 2025.

== Election schedule ==
The election schedule was announced by the state election commission on 23 December 2024.

Poll Event	Schedule
Notification Date	27 December 2024
Last Date for filing nomination	30 December 2024
Scrutiny of nomination	31 December 2024
Last Date for Withdrawal of nomination	2 January 2025
Allotment of Symbols	3 January 2025
Date of Poll	23 January 2025
Date of Counting of Votes	25 January 2025

== Candidates ==
=== Mayoral election ===
No.	Party	Symbol	Candidate's Name
1	Bharatiya Janata Party		Ajay Verma
2	Indian National Congress		Bhairav Goswami

=== Ward-wise candidates ===
Ward No.	Ward Name		
BJP
1	Hanuman Mandir	BJP	Ketan Kumar Dharti
2	Selakhola	BJP	
3	Dubakia	BJP	Kavita Shah
4	Ramshila	BJP	Dharamveer Arya
5	Badreshwar	BJP	Pooja Mehta
6	Champanaula	BJP	Poonam Tripathi
7	Dhuni Mandir	BJP	Meera Mishra
8	Narmadeshwar	BJP	Asha Bisht
9	Heeradungri	BJP	
10	NTD	BJP	
11	Jhijhar	BJP	Amit Shah
12	Tripura Sundari	BJP	Shyam Pandey
13	Mission Compound	BJP	Devesh Bisht
14	Lakshmeshwar	BJP	Abhishek Joshi
15	Paniyudiyar	BJP	Harshbardhan Tiwari
16	Pandekhola	BJP	Jyoti Shah
17	New Collectorate Pandekhola	BJP	Tulsi Chauhari
18	Murli Manohar	BJP	Neha Tamta
19	Vamankhola	BJP	Dikshit Joshi
20	Narsinghbari	BJP	Poonam Verma
21	Siddhpur	BJP	Bhuwan Kandpal
22	Baleshwar	BJP	Indra Singh Bhandari
23	Makeri	BJP	Rahul Joshi
24	Chinakhan	BJP	Sanjay Kumar Joshi
25	Awas Vikas	BJP	Vijay Kumar Bhatt
26	Gandhi Park	BJP	Deep Chandra Joshi
27	Talla Joshikhola	BJP	Mamta Khati
28	Vivekanandpuri	BJP	
29	Bhayarkhola	BJP	
30	Talla Aurkhola	BJP	
31	Rajpur	BJP	Sarita Arya
32	Malla Rajpur	BJP	
33	Nanda Devi	BJP	Arjun Singh Bisht
34	Lala Bazaar	BJP	Devendra Bhatt
35	Niyaganj	BJP	
36	Dharanaula	BJP	
37	Railapali	BJP	
38	New Indira Colony	BJP	Lalita Panchpal
39	Dugal Khola	BJP	Chanchal Durgapal
40	Khagmarakot	BJP	Neema Verma

== Results ==
=== Mayoral election ===
2025 Almora Municipal Corporation Election: Mayor
Party	Candidate	Votes	%	±%
BJP	Ajay Verma	8,788	56.95	New
INC	Bhairav Goswami	6,309	40.88	New
Independent	Aman Ansari	221	1.43	New
NOTA	None of the above	114	0.74	New
Majority		2,479	16.07	New
Turnout		15,432		
BJP win (new seat)				

=== Results by party ===
Party	Seats		
Party	Contested	Won	+/−
Bharatiya Janata Party	29	15	New
Independents	118	25	New
NOTA			
Total	100%	40	

== See also ==
- 2025 Uttarakhand local elections
- 2025 Dehradun Municipal Corporation election
- 2025 Roorkee Municipal Corporation election
- 2025 Haridwar Municipal Corporation election
- 2025 Haldwani Municipal Corporation election
- 2025 Rudrapur Municipal Corporation election
- 2025 Kotdwar Municipal Corporation election
- 2025 Rishikesh Municipal Corporation election
- 2025 Pithoragarh Municipal Corporation election
- 2025 Kashipur Municipal Corporation election
- 2025 Srinagar Municipal Corporation election
