= 2025 Dehradun Municipal Corporation election =

Election to the municipal corporation of Dehradun

- 23 January 2025

All 100 seats in the Dehradun Municipal Corporation 51 seats needed for a majority

	Majority party	Minority party	Third party
Leader	Saurabh Thapliyal	Virendra Pokhriyal	None
Party	BJP	INC	Independent
Last election	60	34	6
Seats won	63	24	13
Seat change	▲3	▼10	▲7
Mayor before election
Sunil Uniyal
BJP
Elected mayor
Saurabh Thapliyal
BJP

The 2025 Dehradun Municipal Corporation election was a municipal election to the Dehradun Municipal Corporation which governs Dehradun City, the largest city in Uttarakhand. It took place on 23 January 2025.

To the 100-ward body, 63 members from the Bharatiya Janata Party were elected, while 24 came from the Indian National Congress and remaining 13 being Independents.

== Election schedule ==
The election schedule was announced by the state election commission on 23 December 2024.

Poll Event	Schedule
Notification Date	27 December 2024
Last Date for filing nomination	30 December 2024
Scrutiny of nomination	31 December 2024
Last Date for Withdrawal of nomination	2 January 2025
Allotment of Symbols	3 January 2025
Date of Poll	23 January 2025
Date of Counting of Votes	25 January 2025

== Candidates ==
=== Mayoral ===
No.	Party	Symbol	Candidate's Name
1	Bharatiya Janata Party		Saurabh Thapliyal
2	Indian National Congress		Virendra Pokhriyal

=== Ward-wise candidates ===
Ward No.	Ward Name				
Ward No.	Ward Name	BJP		INC	
1	Malsi	BJP	Anurag Singh	INC	Surendra Singh Bohra
2	Vijaypur	BJP	Nirmala Thapa	INC	Sagar Lama
3	Ranjhawala	BJP	Shishirkant Tiwari	INC	Anil Chhetri
4	Rajpur	BJP	Alka Kulhan	INC	Urmila Thapa
5	Dhoran	BJP	Alpana Rana	INC	Ranjana Chauhan
6	Doon Vihar	BJP	Meenakshi Nautiyal	INC	Anupama Bharadwaj
7	Jakhan	BJP	Amit Kumar	INC	Arvindra Chaudhary
8	Salawala	BJP	Bhupendra Kathait	INC	Pawan Kharola
9	Arya Nagar	BJP	Yogesh Ghaghat	INC	Nisha Rani
10	Dobhal Wala	BJP	Mohan Bahuguna	INC	Udveer Singh Panwar
11	Vijay Colony	BJP	Bhawna Chaudhary	INC	Monica Rajoria
12	Kishan Nagar	BJP	Nandini Sharma	INC	Poonam Kshetri
13	D.L. Road	BJP	Rekha Devi	INC	Suman
14	Rispana	BJP	Rani Kaur	INC	Pooja Chauhan
15	Karanpur	BJP	Ravi Kumar	INC	Mayank Jakhmola
16	Bakralwala	BJP	Ashok Dobariyal	INC	Vijendra Pal Singh
17	Chukkhuwala	BJP	Satyendra Bhandari	INC	Arjun Sonkar
18	Indra Colony	BJP	Vanshika Sonkar	INC	Savita Sonkar
19	Ghanta Ghar Kalika Mandir	BJP	Santokh Nagpal	INC	Ravi Kumar Phukela
20	Race Course North	BJP	Rahul Panwar	INC	Virender Singh
21	M.K.P.	BJP	Rohan Chandel	INC	Alpana Jadli
22	Tilak Road	BJP	Anita Garg	INC	
23	Khurbura	BJP	Vimla Gaur	INC	Lakshmi Kaur
24	Shivaji Marg	BJP	Vishal Kumar	INC	Nitin Chanchal
25	Indrish Nagar	BJP	Manoj Kumar Jatav	INC	Gagan Chhachhar
26	Dhamawala	BJP	Priyanka Anand	INC	
27	Jhanda Mohalla	BJP	Vaibhav Agarwal	INC	Rajesh Uniyal
28	Dalanwala North	BJP	Geeta Rawat	INC	Kamla Devi
29	Dalanwala East	BJP	Deep Charan	INC	Nikhil Kumar
30	Dalanwala South	BJP	Sunita Majkhola	INC	Durga Negi
31	Kaulaghar	BJP	Samidha Gurung	INC	Piya Thapa
32	Ballupur	BJP	Kiran Nautiyal	INC	Komal Bohra
33	Yamuna Colony	BJP	Sanjay Singhal	INC	Sumitra Dhyani
34	Govind Ghar	BJP	Mahendra Kaur Kukreja	INC	Amrita Kaushal
35	Shri Dev Suman	BJP	Kirti Beniwal	INC	Sangeeta Gupta
36	Vijay Park	BJP	Amita Singh	INC	Geetanjali Sharma
37	Basant Vihar	BJP	Ankit Agarwal	INC	
38	Panditwari	BJP	Manish Pal	INC	Abhishek Tiwari
39	Indra Nagar	BJP	Praveen Negi	INC	Rajeev Chaudhary
40	Seema Dwar	BJP	Meera Kathait	INC	Ramkumar Thapliyal
41	Indrapuram	BJP	Babita Gupta	INC	Payal Behel
42	Kanwali	BJP	Renu Gheyal	INC	Sunita Pundir
43	Dwanpuri	BJP	Rajni Devi	INC	Anju Bharti
44	Patel Nagar West	BJP	Dolly	INC	Neha Sharma
45	Gandhi Gram	BJP	Meenakshi Maurya	INC	Sheela Devi Dhiman
46	Adhoiwala	BJP	Suman Mani	INC	Monica Chaudhary
47	Chandar Road	BJP	Sanjeev Malhotra	INC	Ajay Tyagi
48	Badrish Colony	BJP	Kamli Bhatt	INC	Radha Nautiyal
49	Bhagat Singh Colony	BJP	Mehtab Ali	INC	
50	Rajiv Nagar	BJP	Varsha Badoni	INC	Mahendra Singh Rawat
51	Bani Vihar	BJP	Trilok Bargali	INC	Shubham Chauhan
52	Saraswati Vihar	BJP	Sohan Rautela	INC	Ashish Gusain
53	Mata Mandir Road	BJP	Vimal Uniyal	INC	Kshitij Farasi
54	Chandra Singh Garhwali Ajabpur	BJP	Ranjana Dhanai	INC	Sandhya Uniyal
55	Shah Nagar	BJP	Rakesh Kumar	INC	Jitendra Singh
56	Dharampur	BJP	Sushil Kumar Bagasi	INC	Amit Bhandari
57	Nehru Colony	BJP	Vinod Negi	INC	Kanchan Regmi
58	Defence Colony	BJP	Devendra Gairola	INC	Ajendra Gusain
59	Gujrara Mansingh	BJP	Sanjeet Bansal	INC	Saurabh Uniyal
60	Danda Lakhond	BJP	Abhishek Pant	INC	Manjula Tomar
61	Aamwala Tarla	BJP	Prashant Dobhal	INC	Vijay Raturi
62	Nunarkhera	BJP	Sumit Pundir	INC	Abhinay Bisht
63	Ladpur	BJP	Kavindra Semwal	INC	Swarnim Raj Kandari
64	Nehru Gram	BJP	Sushila	INC	Kavita Negi
65	Dobhal Chowk	BJP	Vijaylakshmi Negi	INC	Sarita Bisht
66	Raipur	BJP	Kapil Dhar	INC	Pratibha Sharma
67	Mohkampur	BJP	Ravindra Singh Rawat	INC	Sumit Devrani
68	Chak Tun Wala Miya Wala	BJP	Pooja Negi	INC	Vijay Singh Bisht
69	Ritha Mandi	BJP	Hariduddin	INC	Etat Khan
70	Lakkhi Bagh	BJP	Ram Kumar Gupta	INC	Ayush Gupta
71	Patel Nagar East	BJP	Mahipal Dhiman	INC	Amandeep Singh
72	Dehrakhas	BJP	Alok Kumar	INC	Nitin Rawat
73	Vidhya Vihar	BJP	Ramesh Gaur	INC	Hemant Upreti
74	Bhrampuri	BJP	Satish Kashyap	INC	Aman Kumar Prajapati
75	Lohia Nagar	BJP	Jasveer Singh	INC	
76	Niranjanpur	BJP	Shraddha Sethi	INC	Sheena Mehta
77	Majra	BJP	Aftab Alam	INC	Zahid Ansari
78	Turner Road	BJP	Mita Gupta	INC	Kusum
79	Bharuwala Grant	BJP	Deepak Negi	INC	Piyush Gaur
80	Rest Camp	BJP	Anjali Singhal	INC	Archana Kapoor
81	Race Course South	BJP	Rakhi Barthawal	INC	Pushpa Panwar
82	Deep Nagar	BJP	Dinesh Sati	INC	Anil Sharma
83	Kedarpur	BJP	Darshan Lal Binjola	INC	Naveen Chandra Ramola
84	Banjarowala	BJP	Lakshmi Rana	INC	Anita Saklani
85	Mothrowala	BJP	Mam Chand	INC	Arvind Kumar Gurung
86	Sewla Kalan	BJP	Manju Kaushik	INC	Veermati Devi
87	Pithuwala	BJP	Pushkar Chauhan	INC	Hari Prasad Bhatt
88	Mehuwala-1	BJP	Pushpa Nautiyal	INC	Tarannum
89	Mehuwala-2	BJP	Usha Chauhan	INC	Priya Verma
90	Mohobiwala	BJP	Sudhir Thapa	INC	Mohan Lal Gurung
91	Chanderbani	BJP	Suman Butola	INC	
92	Arcadia-1	BJP	Anil Nautiyal	INC	Pawan Tomar
93	Arcadia-2	BJP	Kiran Yadav	INC	Kailashi Negi
94	Nathanpur-1	BJP	Meharban Singh Bhandari	INC	Jitendra Kumar
95	Nathanpur-2	BJP	Ravindra Gusain	INC	Karuna Singh
96	Nawada	BJP	Virendra Walia	INC	Sachin Thapa
97	Harrawala	BJP	Vinod Kumar	INC	Suman Rani
98	Ballawala	BJP	Prashant Kharola	INC	Ashish Khatri
99	Nakrunda	BJP	Rahul Kumar	INC	Pradeep Kumar
100	Nathuawala	BJP	Swati Dobhal	INC	Anjil Thapliyal

== Results ==
=== Mayoral election ===
2025 Dehradun Municipal Corporation Election: Mayor
Party	Candidate	Votes	%	±%
BJP	Saurabh Thapliyal	242,229	58.29	▲11.88
INC	Virendra Pokhriyal	1,36,535	32.86	▼3.38
Independent	Sardar Khan Pappu	9,608	2.31	▲1.72
Independent	Sulochna Ishtwal	6,827	1.64	New
Independent	Vijay Prasad Bhattarai	5,898	1.42	New
UKD	Birendra Singh Bisht	4,249	1.02	▲0.46
Independent	Rajendra Prasad Gairola	3,840	0.92	New
NOTA	None of the above	2,927	0.7	▲0.03
AAP	Ravindra Singh Anand	2,469	0.59	▼7.68
Independent	Arushi Sundriyal	382	0.09	New
Majority		1,05,694	25.43	▲15.26
Turnout		4,15,496	55.9	▲0.73
BJP hold		Swing	▲11.88	

=== Results by party ===
Party	Seats		
Party	Contested	Won	+/−
Bharatiya Janata Party	100	63	▲3
Indian National Congress	99 (Note: Congress did not have a candidate in Ward No. 49 Bhagat Singh Colony.)	24	▼10
Other parties	24 (Note: Includes parties like AAP, CPI(M) & UKD.)	0	Steady
Independents	154	13	▲7
NOTA		0	Steady
Total	100%	100	Steady

== See also ==
- 2025 Uttarakhand local elections
- 2025 Pithoragarh Municipal Corporation election
- 2025 Roorkee Municipal Corporation election
- 2025 Haridwar Municipal Corporation election
- 2025 Haldwani Municipal Corporation election
- 2025 Rudrapur Municipal Corporation election
- 2025 Kotdwar Municipal Corporation election
- 2025 Rishikesh Municipal Corporation election
- 2025 Almora Municipal Corporation election
- 2025 Kashipur Municipal Corporation election
- 2025 Srinagar Municipal Corporation election
