= 2013 Dehradun Municipal Corporation election =

Local election in India

- 28 April 2013

All 60 seats in the Dehradun Municipal Corporation 31 seats needed for a majority

	Majority party	Minority party	Third party
Leader	Vinod Chamoli	Suryakant Dhasmana	Rajni Rawat
Party	BJP	INC	BSP
Last election	28	24	1
Seats won	34	22	2
Seat change	▲6	▼2	▲1
Mayor before election
Vinod Chamoli
BJP
Elected mayor
Vinod Chamoli
BJP

The 2013 Dehradun Municipal Corporation election was a municipal election to the Dehradun Municipal Corporation, which governs Dehradun, the largest city in Uttarakhand. It took place on 28 April 2013. Vinod Chamoli of BJP became the mayor. He defeated the Congress candidate Suryakant Shasmana. In 2018, he was criticised for retaining the mayor post after he was elected as an MLA.

== Election schedule ==
Event	Date
Date for Nominations	8 April 2013
Last Date for filing Nominations	12 April 2013
Date for scrutiny of nominations	13 April 2013
Last date for withdrawal of candidatures	15 April 2013
Allotment of Symbols	16 April 2013
Date of poll	28 April 2013
Date of counting	30 April 2013

== Mayoral election ==
2013 Dehradun Municipal Corporation Election: Mayor
Party	Candidate	Votes	%	±%
BJP	Vinod Chamoli	80,530	40.93	▲7.86
INC	Suryakant Dhasmana	57,618	29.28	▲7.2
BSP	Rajni Rawat	46,689	23.73	▲18.15
UKD	Manmohan Lakhera	3,302	1.68	▼7.62
Independent	Sardar Khan (Pappu)	2,192	1.11	New
Independent	Sanjay Goyal	2,191	1.11	▲0.25
Independent	Maqbool Ahmad	1,777	0.90	New
Independent	Rajendra Prasad Gairola	1,521	0.77	New
Independent	Rajiv Kothari	500	0.25	New
Independent	Shivdarshan Singh Rawat	430	0.22	New
Majority		22,912	11.65	▲2.64
Turnout		1,96,750		
BJP hold		Swing		

== Position of the house ==
Dehradun Municipal Corporation
Party	Won	+/−
Bharatiya Janata Party (BJP)	34	▲6
Indian National Congress (INC)	22	▼2
Bahujan Samaj Party (BSP)	2	▲1
Uttarakhand Kranti Dal (UKD)	0	▼1
Independents	2	▼4
Total	60	Steady

== See also ==
- 2013 Uttarakhand local elections
- 2013 Haridwar Municipal Corporation election
