= Saurabh Thapliyal =

Indian politician

Mayor of Dehradun
- Incumbent
- Assumed office 7 February 2025
- Preceded by: Sunil Uniyal

Personal details
- Born: Dehradun, Uttarakhand India
- Party: Bharatiya Janata Party
- Education: SCBA, Dehradun
- Profession: Politician

Saurabh Thapliyal is an Indian politician affiliated with the Bharatiya Janata Party (BJP). In January 2025, he was elected as the Mayor of Dehradun, securing a historic victory with the largest margin ever recorded in the city's municipal elections and in any local election in the state.

== Early life and education ==
Saurabh Thapliyal was born and raised in Dehradun, Uttarakhand. He completed his schooling in the city before pursuing higher education at SCBA , Nathuawala, Dehradun. During his time at SCBA, he was actively involved in student politics and served as the President of the Students' Union in 2001.

== Political career ==
Thapliyal began his political journey through student activism, where he gained recognition for his leadership skills. He later became the State President of the Bharatiya Janata Yuva Morcha (BJYM) in 2013, further cementing his role in the BJP.

In December 2024, the BJP nominated Thapliyal as its candidate for the Dehradun mayoral elections. His selection was seen as a move to bring youthful leadership into local governance.

The municipal elections were held on 23 January 2025, with a voter turnout of 55.9%. Thapliyal secured a decisive victory, receiving 241,778 votes and defeating Congress candidate Virendra Singh Pokhriyal by a margin of 105,295 votes.

== Elections contested ==
=== Dehradun Municipal Corporation ===
| Year | Post | Result | Vote Percentage | Opposition Candidate | Opposition Party | Opposition Vote Percentage |
|---|---|---|---|---|---|---|
| 2025 | Mayor | Won | 58.29% | Virendra Pokhriyal | INC | 32.86% |
