= 2025 Pithoragarh Municipal Corporation election =

Election to the municipal corporation of Pithoragarh

- 23 January 2025

All 40 seats in the Pithoragarh Municipal Corporation 21 seats needed for a majority
	Majority party	Third party
Leader	Kalpana Deolal	None
Party	BJP	Independent
Last election	New	New
Seats won	5	35
Seat change	New	New
Mayor before election
Office established
Elected mayor
Kalpana Deolal
BJP

The 2025 Pithoragarh Municipal Corporation election was a municipal election to the Pithoragarh Municipal Corporation which governs Pithoragarh City, the largest hill city in Uttarakhand. It was held on 23 January 2025. It was won by Kapana Devlal of BJP who defeated Congress rebel and Congress MLA Mayukh Mahar backed candidate Monika Mahar by just 17 votes in a very close election. It was one of the closest races in the state. Incidentally, total number of spoiled ballot (134) exceeded almost 8 times of the margin.

Despite winning the mayor post, BJP won just 5 out of 40 ward members. Independent or Congress backed candidates won in 35 seats.

== Election schedule ==
The election schedule was announced by the state election commission on 23 December 2024.

Poll Event	Schedule
Notification Date	27 December 2024
Last Date for filing nomination	30 December 2024
Scrutiny of nomination	31 December 2024
Last Date for Withdrawal of nomination	2 January 2025
Allotment of Symbols	3 January 2025
Date of Poll	23 January 2025
Date of Counting of Votes	25 January 2025

== Major Candidates ==
=== Mayoral election ===
No.	Party	Symbol	Candidate's Name
1	Bharatiya Janata Party		Kalpana Deolal
2	Indian National Congress		Anju Lunthi
3	Independent		Monika Mahar

=== Ward-wise candidates ===
Ward No.	Ward Name				
Ward No.	Ward Name	BJP		INC	
1	Bajeti	BJP		INC	
2	New Bajeti	BJP		INC	
3	Nirada	BJP		INC	
4	Kumor	BJP	Asha Devi	INC	
5	Piyana	BJP	Rajendra Tamta	INC	
6	Takana Colony	BJP	Vikram Valmiki	INC	
7	Shiv Vihar	BJP	Vinod Rawat	INC	
8	Linthuda	BJP		INC	
9	Jakhani	BJP		INC	
10	Bin	BJP	Saroj Devi	INC	
11	Bhatkote	BJP		INC	Ashish Havord
12	Rai	BJP		INC	
13	Pandey Gaon	BJP		INC	
14	Padampur Colony	BJP	Prithviraj Bisht	INC	
15	Bhadelbada	BJP	Gopal Singh Rana	INC	
16	Chandrabhaga	BJP	Lalita Joshi	INC	
17	Dumkhani	BJP	Deepak Mahar	INC	
18	New Tildhukri	BJP	Neeraj Kothari	INC	
19	Krishnapuri	BJP		INC	
20	Jagdamba Colony	BJP	Anita Samant	INC	
21	Kujoli	BJP		INC	
22	Jagriti Colony	BJP	Lalit Pant	INC	
23	Shivalaya	BJP	Shivani Saini	INC	
24	Purana Bazaar	BJP	Mohammad Sarfaraz	INC	
25	Naya Bazaar	BJP	Umesh Lal Shah	INC	
26	Simalgair	BJP	Kavindra Shah	INC	
27	Pithrota	BJP		INC	
28	Aincholi	BJP	Kamala Pandey	INC	
29	Pankot	BJP	Bhupendra Singh Belal	INC	
30	Daula	BJP	Saraswati Devi	INC	
31	Western Cinemaline	BJP		INC	
32	Eastern Cinemaline	BJP	Anshu Negi	INC	
33	Dhanauda	BJP	Bhawana Kapri	INC	
34	Neda Basti	BJP	Dinesh Kapri	INC	
35	Puneri	BJP		INC	
36	Sera Chandak	BJP	Harish Bora	INC	
37	Old Tildhukri	BJP		INC	
38	Malla Jakhani	BJP	Suman Dhami	INC	
39	Khadkot	BJP	Ravindra Singh Basera	INC	
40	Vivekanand	BJP	Praveen Singh Uprari	INC	

=== Predictions ===
Because the election was a highly localized municipal body contest, no formal, scientific opinion surveys, sample-based tracking polls, or exit poll aggregations were conducted by national agencies or major statistical polling organizations. Ground-level assessments were driven exclusively by local journalistic consensus, candidate-sponsored internal campaign assessments, and independent ward analyses.

However, locals agreed that the election was close with no one with a definite lead. Analysts also pointed that the Congress would have been at the forefront to a win had Monika Mahar got the ticket.

Poll / Assessment source	Date(s) administered	Sample size (Note: Sample sizes for local municipal tracking reflect local ground assessment areas rather than standard scientific telephone surveys.)	Margin of error	Kalpana Deolal	Monika Mahar	Anju Lunthi	Undecided / Other
Local Media Consensus Archive	January 18–21, 2025	Ground Assessment	N/A	36%	36%	21%	7%
Independent Ward Tracking Group	January 12–15, 2025	Voice of Pithoragarh	N/A	34%	34%	24%	8%

Hypothetical polling

Mayoral Primary Consensus (BJP Ticket Assessment)

Assessment source	Date(s) administered	Focus Group Area	Kalpana Deolal	Uma Pande	Pramila Bohra	Undecided
Internal Party Assessment Survey	December 24–27, 2024	Pithoragarh Votes	42%	29%	18%	11%

Mayoral Primary Consensus (Congress Ticket Assessment)

Assessment source	Date(s) administered	Focus Group Area	Monika Mahar	Anju Lunthi	Undecided
District Congress Committee Tracking	December 29, 2024 – January 2, 2025	Pithoragarh Votes	59%	31%	10%

Mayoral election

Poll / Assessment source	Date(s) administered	Sample size	Margin of error	Kalpana Deolal (BJP)	Monika Mahar (INC)	Undecided / Other
Local Media Consensus Archive	January 18–21, 2025	Ground Assessment	N/A	36%	55%	9%

== Results ==
=== Mayoral election ===
2025 Pithoragarh Municipal Corporation Election: Mayor
Party	Candidate	Votes	%	±%
BJP	Kalpana Deolal	9,466	39.35	New
Independent	Monika Mahar	9,449	39.28	New
INC	Anju Lunthi	3,379	14.04	New
Independent	Chandrakala Mahar	615	2.55	New
Independent	Pratila Bohra	558	2.32	New
Independent	Uma Pandey	229	0.95	New
BSP	Kusum Devi	139	0.57	New
Spoiled ballots	Invalid	134	0.56	New
NOTA	None of the above	125	0.52	New
AAP	Sushma Bisht Mathur	94	0.39	New
Majority		17	0.07	New
Turnout		24,054	64.75%	New
Registered electors		44,974		New
BJP win (new seat)				

=== Results by party ===
Party	Seats		
Party	Contested	Won	+/−
Bharatiya Janata Party	20	5	New
Indian National Congress	1	0	New
Independents	140	35	New
NOTA			New
Total	161	40	New

== See also ==
- 2025 Uttarakhand local elections
- 2025 Dehradun Municipal Corporation election
- 2025 Roorkee Municipal Corporation election
- 2025 Haridwar Municipal Corporation election
- 2025 Haldwani Municipal Corporation election
- 2025 Rudrapur Municipal Corporation election
- 2025 Kotdwar Municipal Corporation election
- 2025 Rishikesh Municipal Corporation election
- 2025 Almora Municipal Corporation election
- 2025 Kashipur Municipal Corporation election
- 2025 Srinagar Municipal Corporation election
