= Dinesh Agrawal =

Indian politician

Cabinet Minister Sports, Forests and Wild Life Law and Justice Government of Uttarakhand
- In office 2012–2017

Member of Legislative Assembly for Dharampur
- In office 2012–2017

Member of Legislative Assembly for Lakshman Chowk
- In office 2002–2012

Personal details
- Party: Bharatiya Janata Party (since 2024)
- Other political affiliations: Indian National Congress (until 2024)

Dinesh Agrawal is an Indian politician from Uttarakhand and a three term former member of the Uttarakhand Legislative Assembly. He represented the Dharampur assembly constituency. He is a member of the Bharatiya Janata Party, which he joined in 2024.

== Elections contested ==
=== Uttar Pradesh Legislative Assembly ===
Year	Constituency	Result	Vote percentage	Opposition Candidate	Opposition Party	Opposition vote percentage	Ref
1993	Dehradun	Lost	38.55%	Harbans Kapoor	BJP	53.74%	
1996	Dehradun	Lost	17.98%	Harbans Kapoor	BJP	56.37%	

=== Uttarakhand Legislative Assembly ===
Year	Constituency	Result	Vote percentage	Opposition Candidate	Opposition Party	Opposition vote percentage	Ref
2002	Lakshman Chowk	Won	35.11%	Nityanand Swami	BJP	33.21%	
2007	Lakshman Chowk	Won	46.00%	Nityanand Swami	BJP	41.41%	
2012	Dharampur	Won	50.38%	Prakash Dhyani	BJP	37.86%	
2017	Dharampur	Lost	40.59%	Vinod Chamoli	BJP	50.69%	
2022	Dharampur	Lost	40.76%	Vinod Chamoli	BJP	49.25%	

=== Dehradun Municipal Corporation ===
Year	Post	Result	Vote Percentage	Opposition Candidate	Opposition Party	Opposition Vote Percentage
2018	Mayor	Lost	36.24%	Sunil Uniyal 'Gama'	BJP	46.41%
