= 2025 Haldwani Municipal Corporation election =

Election to the municipal corporation of Haldwani

- 23 January 2025

All 60 seats in the Haldwani Municipal Corporation 31 seats needed for a majority

	Majority party	Minority party	Third party
Leader	Gajraj Singh Bisht	Lalit Joshi	None
Party	BJP	INC	Independent
Last election	31	26	0
Seats won	23	2	34
Seat change	▼8	▼24	▲34
Mayor before election
Jogendra Pal Singh Rautela
BJP
Elected mayor
Gajraj Singh Bisht
BJP

The 2025 Haldwani Municipal Corporation election was a municipal election to the Haldwani Municipal Corporation which governs Haldwani city in Uttarakhand. It took place on 23 January 2025.

== Election schedule ==
The election schedule was announced by the state election commission on 23 December 2024.

Poll Event	Schedule
Notification Date	27 December 2024
Last Date for filing nomination	30 December 2024
Scrutiny of nomination	31 December 2024
Last Date for Withdrawal of nomination	2 January 2025
Allotment of Symbols	3 January 2025
Date of Poll	23 January 2025
Date of Counting of Votes	25 January 2025

== Candidates ==
=== Mayoral ===
No.	Party	Symbol	Candidate's Name
1	Bharatiya Janata Party		Gajraj Singh Bisht
2	Indian National Congress		Lalit Joshi

== Results ==
=== Mayoral election ===
2025 Haldwani Municipal Corporation Election: Mayor
Party	Candidate	Votes	%
BJP	Gajraj Singh Bisht	71,962	47.38
INC	Lalit Joshi	68,068	44.81
Independent	R.P. Singh	2,531	1.67
Independent	Bhuvan Chandra Pandey	2,136	1.34
Independent	Deep Chandra Pandey	1,597	1.41
Independent	Manoj Kumar Arya	1,377	0.9
Independent	Manoj Kumar Mannu	1,109	0.73
BSP	Shiv Ganesh	1,088	0.72
NOTA	None of the above	823	0.54
Independent	Naveen Chandra	772	0.51
UKD	Mohan Kandpal	414	0.27
Majority		3,894	2.57
Total votes		158,646	
BJP hold			

=== Results by party ===
Party	Seats		
Party	Contested	Won	+/−
Bharatiya Janata Party	47	23	▼8
Indian National Congress	11	2	▼24
Other parties (Note: 3 of UKD and 2 of AAP.)	5	1	▼2
Independents	168	34	▲34
NOTA			Steady
Total	231	60	Steady

== See also ==
- 2025 Uttarakhand local elections
- 2025 Dehradun Municipal Corporation election
- 2025 Roorkee Municipal Corporation election
- 2025 Haridwar Municipal Corporation election
- 2025 Pithoragarh Municipal Corporation election
- 2025 Rudrapur Municipal Corporation election
- 2025 Kotdwar Municipal Corporation election
- 2025 Rishikesh Municipal Corporation election
- 2025 Almora Municipal Corporation election
- 2025 Kashipur Municipal Corporation election
- 2025 Srinagar Municipal Corporation election
