= Almora Municipal Corporation =

Civic body that governs the town of Almora in Uttarakhand, India

Almora Municipal Corporation अल्मोड़ा नगर निगम Almora Nagar Nigam
- Unicameral Legislature

Type
- Type: Municipal Corporation

Leadership
- Mayor: Ajay Verma, BJP since 7 February 2025
- Municipal Commissioner: Seema Vishwakarma, IAS

Structure
- Seats: 40
- Political groups: Government (40): BJP (15); IND (25)

Elections
- Voting system: First-past-the-post
- Last election: 23 January 2025
- Next election: 2030

Meeting place
- Nagar Nigam Bhavan, Almora

Almora Municipal Corporation is the civic body that governs the city of Almora in Uttarakhand, India.

== List of mayors ==
S. No.	Name	Term			Party
1	Ajay Verma	7 February 2025	Incumbent	1 year, 113 days	Bharatiya Janata Party

== Current members ==
Almora Municipal Corporation has a total of 40 members or corporators, who are directly elected after a term of 5 years. The council is led by the Mayor. The latest elections were held in 23 January 2025. The current mayor of Almora is Ajay Verma of the Bharatiya Janata Party.

Mayor: Ajay Verma
Ward No	Ward Name	Name of Corporator	Party	Remarks
1	Hanuman Mandir	Vaibhav Pandey	Independent	
2	Selakhola	Vandana Verma	Independent	
3	Dubakia	Anju Bisht	Independent	
4	Ramshila	Naveen Chandra Arya	Independent	
5	Badreshwar	Janki Pandey	Independent	
6	Champanaula	Poonam Tripathi	Bharatiya Janata Party	
7	Dhuni Mandir	Meera Mishra	Bharatiya Janata Party	
8	Narmadeshwar	Asha Bisht	Bharatiya Janata Party	
9	Heeradungri	Ekta Verma	Independent	
10	NTD	Radha Matiyani	Independent	
11	Jhijhar	Amit Shah	Bharatiya Janata Party	
12	Tripura Sundari	Shyam Pandey	Bharatiya Janata Party	
13	Mission Compound	Devesh Bisht	Bharatiya Janata Party	
14	Lakshmeshwar	Abhishek Joshi	Bharatiya Janata Party	
15	Paniyudiyar	Bhupendra Joshi	Independent	
16	Pandekhola	Jyoti Shah	Bharatiya Janata Party	
17	New Collectorate Pandekhola	Tulsi Devi	Independent	
18	Murli Manohar	Neha Tamta	Bharatiya Janata Party	
19	Vamankhola	Rohit Kumar Karki	Independent	
20	Narsinghbari	Poonam Verma	Bharatiya Janata Party	
21	Siddhpur	Gunjan Singh Chamiyal	Independent	
22	Baleshwar	Indra Mohan Singh Bhandari	Bharatiya Janata Party	
23	Makeri	Rahul Joshi	Bharatiya Janata Party	
24	Chinakhan	Sanjay Kumar Joshi	Bharatiya Janata Party	
25	Awas Vikas	Vijay Kumar Bhatt	Bharatiya Janata Party	
26	Gandhi Park	Deep Chandra Joshi	Bharatiya Janata Party	
27	Talla Joshikhola	Hem Chandra Tiwari	Independent	
28	Vivekanandpuri	Kamla Kirola	Independent	
29	Bhayarkhola	Anup Bharti	Independent	
30	Talla Aurkhola	Deepak Kumar	Independent	
31	Rajpur	Mukesh Kumar	Independent	
32	Malla Rajpur	Vikas Kumar Arya	Independent	
33	Nanda Devi	Arjun Singh Bisht	Bharatiya Janata Party	
34	Lala Bazar	Kuldeep Singh Mer	Independent	
35	Niyaganj	Intekhab Alam Qureshi	Independent	
36	Dharanaula	Reena Tamta	Independent	
37	Railapali	Pradeep Chandra Arya	Independent	
38	New Indira Colony	Geeta Bisht	Independent	
39	Dugal Khola	Chanchal Durgapal	Independent	
40	Khagmarakot	Madhu Bisht	Independent	

== Election results ==
The Almora Municipal Corporation holds direct elections every five years in the state and the latest elections were those held in the year 2025.

=== Mayoral ===
Year	No. of Wards	Winner				Runner Up				Margin
Year	No. of Wards	Party	Candidate	Votes	%	Party	Candidate	Votes	%	Margin
2025	40	Bharatiya Janata Party	Ajay Verma	8,788	56.95	Indian National Congress	Bhairav Goswami	6,309	40.88	2,479

=== Ward-wise ===
==== 2025 ====
Almora Municipal Corporation
Party	Won	+/−
Bharatiya Janata Party	15	New
Independents	25	New
Total	40	

== See also ==
- 2025 Almora Municipal Corporation election
