= Sunil Uniyal =

Indian politician

Sunil Uniyal 'Gama'
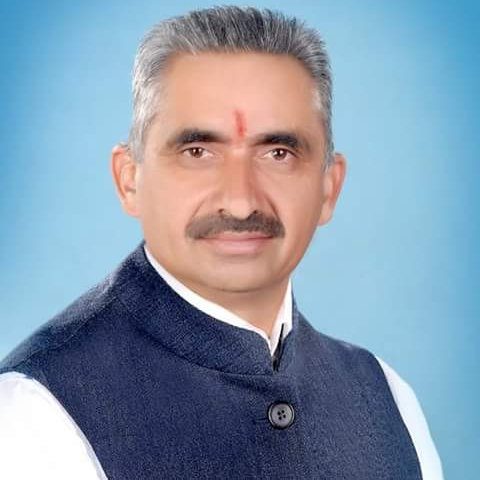

Mayor of Dehradun
- In office 2 December 2018 – 2 December 2023
- Preceded by: Vinod Chamoli
- Succeeded by: Saurabh Thapliyal

Personal details
- Party: Bharatiya Janata Party

Sunil Uniyal 'Gama' is an Indian politician from Uttarakhand who is a member of the Bharatiya Janata Party. He served as the mayor of Dehradun from 2018 until 2023.

== Elections contested ==
=== Dehradun Municipal Corporation ===
Year	Post	Result	Vote Percentage	Opposition Candidate	Opposition Party	Opposition Vote Percentage
2018	Mayor	Won	46.41%	Dinesh Agrawal	INC	36.24%
