= 2013 Haridwar Municipal Corporation election =

Local election in India

- 28 April 2013

All 30 seats in the Haridwar Municipal Corporation 16 seats needed for a majority

	Majority party	Minority party	Third party
Leader	Manoj Garg	Rishishwaranand	none
Party	BJP	INC	Independent
Seats won	19	6	5
Mayor before election
office created
Elected mayor
Manoj Garg
BJP

The 2013 Haridwar Municipal Corporation election was a municipal election to the Haridwar Municipal Corporation, which governs Haridwar in Uttarakhand. It took place on 28 April 2013.

== Election schedule ==
Event	Date
Date for Nominations	8 April 2013
Last Date for filing Nominations	12 April 2013
Date for scrutiny of nominations	13 April 2013
Last date for withdrawal of candidatures	15 April 2013
Allotment of Symbols	16 April 2013
Date of poll	28 April 2013
Date of counting	30 April 2013

== Mayoral election ==
2013 Haridwar Municipal Corporation election: Mayor
Party	Candidate	Votes	%	±%
BJP	Manoj Garg	48,950	48.76	New
INC	Rishishwaranand	31,803	31.67	New
Independent	Murli Manohar	9,744	9.7	New
BSP	Irfan Ali	5,962	5.94	New
Independent	Vijay Verma	2,262	2.25	New
SP	Qazi Chand	871	0.86	New
Independent	Ajay Gupta	801	0.79	New
Majority		17,147	17.09	New
Turnout		1,00,393		
BJP win (new seat)				

== Position of the house ==
Haridwar Municipal Corporation
Party	Won
Bharatiya Janata Party (BJP)	19
Indian National Congress (INC)	6
Independents	5
Total	30

== See also ==
- 2013 Uttarakhand local elections
- 2018 Uttarakhand local elections
- 2025 Uttarakhand local elections
- 2025 Haridwar Municipal Corporation election
