= Manorama Dobriyal Sharma =

Indian politician (1955–2015)

Member of Parliament, Rajya Sabha
- In office 26 November 2014 – 18 February 2015
- Preceded by: Bhagat Singh Koshyari
- Succeeded by: Raj Babbar
- Constituency: Uttarakhand

Mayor Dehradun Municipal Corporation
- In office 8 February 2003 – 7 February 2008
- Preceded by: Inaugural holder
- Succeeded by: Vinod Chamoli

Personal details
- Born: 9 March 1955
- Died: 18 February 2015 (aged 59) Gurugram, Haryana, India
- Party: Indian National Congress
- Spouse: B.S. Sharma

Manorama Dobriyal Sharma (9 March 1955 – 18 February 2015) was an Indian politician who was a member of the Indian National Congress party. She represented the Uttarakhand constituency in Rajya Sabha from 26 November 2014 until 18 February 2015, when she died, aged 59.

== Positions held ==
Year	Description
2003 - 2008	Mayor, Dehradun Municipal Corporation
2005 - 2008	Chairperson, All India Council of Mayors, New Delhi
2006 - 2010	Chairperson, Elected Board Member, Commonwealth Local Government Forum
2007 - 2009	Member, Central Advisory Board on Child Labour, Ministry of L&E, (India)
2009 - 2012	Member, Advisory Board, Ministry of Culture (India)
2014 - 2015	Elected to Rajya Sabha (died in office)
