= Haridwar Municipal Corporation =

Civic body that governs the city of Haridwar in Uttarakhand, India

Haridwar Municipal Corporation हरिद्वार नगर निगम Haridwar Nagar Nigam
- Unicameral Legislature

Type
- Type: Municipal Corporation

Leadership
- Mayor: Kiran Jaisal, BJP since 7 February 2025
- Municipal Commissioner: Varun Chaudhary, IAS
- Assistant Municipal Commissioner: Vinod Kumar, PCS; Tanvir Marwah, PCS

Structure
- Seats: 60
- Political groups: Government (40): BJP (40); Opposition (20): INC (15); IND (5)

Elections
- Voting system: First-past-the-post
- Last election: 23 January 2025
- Next election: 2030

Meeting place
- Nagar Nigam Bhavan, Haridwar

The Haridwar Municipal Corporation is the civic body that governs the city of Haridwar in Uttarakhand, India.

== Structure ==
This corporation consists of 60 wards and is headed by a mayor who presides over a deputy mayor and 59 other corporators representing the wards. The mayor is elected directly through a first-past-the-post voting system and the deputy mayor is elected by the corporators from among their numbers.

== List of mayors ==
S. No.	Name	Term			Party
1	Manoj Garg	3 May 2013	3 May 2018	5 years, 0 days	Bharatiya Janata Party
Administrator		3 May 2018	2 December 2018	212 days	Government of Uttarakhand
2	Anita Sharma	2 December 2018	2 December 2023	5 years, 0 days	Indian National Congress
Administrator		2 December 2023	6 February 2025	1 year, 66 days	Government of Uttarakhand
3	Kiran Jaisal	7 February 2025	Incumbent	1 year, 76 days	Bharatiya Janata Party

== Current members ==
Haridwar Municipal Corporation has a total of 60 members or corporators, who are directly elected after a term of 5 years. The council is led by the Mayor. The latest elections were held in 23 January 2025. The current mayor of Kiran Jaisal of the Bharatiya Janata Party.

Mayor: Kiran Jaisal
Ward No	Ward Name	Name of Corporator	Party	Remarks
1	Saptarishi	Akash Bhati	BJP	
2	Bhupatwala	Sunita Sharma	BJP	
3	Durga Nagar	Suryakant Sharma	BJP	
4	Kharkhari	Rishabh Vashisht	INC	
5	Shri Gangadhar Mahadev Nagar	Anil Vashisht	BJP	
6	Bhimgora	Sumit Chaudhary	BJP	
7	Har Ki Pauri	Shruti Khevadia	BJP	
8	Gaughat	Himanshu Gupta	INC	
9	Brahmpuri	Sohit Sethi	INC	
10	Bilkeshwar	Sachin Kumar	BJP	
11	Shrawan Nath Nagar	Deepak Sharma	BJP	
12	Nirmala Cantonment	Ishtadev Soni	BJP	
13	Mayapur	Manju Rawat	BJP	
14	Rishikul	Lalit Rawat	BJP	
15	Vivek Vihar	Vivek Bhushan	INC	
16	Shivlok	Nisha Naudiyal	BJP	
17	Tibri	Rani Devi	BJP	
18	Govindpuri	Mamata Negi	BJP	
19	Khanna Nagar	Monika Saini	BJP	
20	Awas Vikas	Rajesh Sharma	BJP	
21	Sharda Nagar	Pinki Chaudhary	BJP	
22	Aryanagar	Sapna Sharma	BJP	
23	Ramnagar	Ashi Sharma	BJP	
24	Krishna Nagar	P.S. Gill	BJP	
25	Acharayan	Ekta Gupta	BJP	
26	Sandesh Nagar	Shubham Mendola	BJP	
27	Latowali	Sunil Agarwal	BJP	
28	Rajghat	Mukul Parashar	BJP	
29	Kumhar Garha	Prashant Saini	BJP	
30	Chowk Bazaar	Sachin Agarwal	BJP	
31	Ravidas Basti	Bhupendra Kumar	BJP	
32	Nathnagar	Anuj Singh	BJP	
33	Shastri Nagar	Sunil Kumar Singh	INC	
34	Ambedkar Nagar	Nisha Pundir	BJP	
35	Kadachh	Anju Kumar	INC	
36	Teliyan	Monika Gihar	BJP	
37	Katorawan	Nauman Ansari	INC	
38	Mehtan	Annu Mehta	BJP	
39	Lodha Mandi	Shabana	INC	
40	Peeth Bazaar	Jahara	IND	
41	Kassawan	Arshad Khwaja	INC	
42	Valmiki Basti	Kritika Vaid	INC	
43	Paodhoi	Harvinder	BJP	
44	Trimurti Nagar	Ahsan Ansari	IND	
45	Tapovan Nagar	Yogendra Saini	BJP	
46	Neelkhudana	Khursheeda Ahmad	INC	
47	Pandewala	Adesh Kumar	IND	
48	Chaklana	Ashutosh Chakrapani	BJP	
49	Lakkadharan	Tanmay Kshetriya	IND	
50	Maidanian	Neelofar Ansari	INC	
51	Ghosian	Heena Parveen	INC	
52	Ahvab Nagar	Sunil Kumar Pandey	BJP	
53	Vishnu Lok	Hitesh Chaudhary	BJP	
54	Gurukul	Nagendra Singh Rana	BJP	
55	Shivpuri	Sunny Kumar	INC	
56	Hanumantpuram	Yadram Walia	BJP	
57	Jagjeetpur	Manoj Puraliya	BJP	
58	Raja Garden	Sumit Tyagi	INC	
59	Sitapur	Vineet Chauhan	BJP	
60	Harilok	Aakarshika Sharma	IND	

== Election results ==
The Haridwar Municipal Corporation holds direct elections every five years in the state and the latest elections were those held in the year 2025.

=== Mayoral ===
Year	No. of Wards	Winner				Runner Up				Margin
Year	No. of Wards	Party	Candidate	Votes	%	Party	Candidate	Votes	%	Margin
2013	30	Bharatiya Janata Party	Manoj Garg	48,950	48.76	Indian National Congress	Rishishwarananda	31,803	31.67	17,147
2018	60	Indian National Congress	Anita Sharma	59,672	48.61	Bharatiya Janata Party	Annu Kakkar	56,205	45.79	3,467
2025	60	Bharatiya Janata Party	Kiran Jaisal	72,773	57.86	Indian National Congress	Amresh Baliyan	44,203	35.15	28,570

=== Ward-wise ===
==== 2025 ====
Haridwar Municipal Corporation
Party	Won	+/−
Bharatiya Janata Party	40	▲7
Indian National Congress	15	▼3
Bahujan Samaj Party	0	▼1
Independents	5	▼3
Total	60	Steady

==== 2018 ====
Haridwar Municipal Corporation
Party	Won	+/−
Bharatiya Janata Party	33	▲14
Indian National Congress	18	▲12
Bahujan Samaj Party	1	▲1
Independents	8	▲3
Total	60	▲30

==== 2013 ====
Haridwar Municipal Corporation
Party	Won	+/−
Bharatiya Janata Party	19	New
Indian National Congress	6	New
Independents	5	New
Total	30	

== See also ==
- 2013 Haridwar Municipal Corporation election
- 2025 Haridwar Municipal Corporation election
