= Suryakant Dhasmana =

Indian politician

Vice President Uttarakhand Pradesh Congress Committee
- Incumbent
- Assumed office 2011

Personal details
- Born: 5 February 1964 (age 62) Dehradun
- Party: Indian National Congress
- Other political affiliations: Lok Dal; Samajwadi Party; Nationalist Congress Party
- Spouse: Dr. Priyanka Dhasmana
- Website: Official Facebook Page

Suryakant Dhasmana (born 5 February 1964 in Dehradun) is an Indian politician. He is Vice President of Uttarakhand Pradesh Congress. His was educated at St. Joseph Academy, Dehradun. He graduated from DBS College, Dehradun with post graduation from DAV (PG) College, Dehradun.

In 2003 and 2013, he lost the mayoral election.

Dhasmana had unsuccessfully contested as a candidate of Indian National Congress from Dehradun Cantonment Constituency in the 2017 Uttarakhand Legislative Assembly election and 2022 Uttarakhand Legislative Assembly election. He was the chairman of Vinod Bharatwal Committee which led the plan of making of the state of Uttarakhand, and his recommendations played important role in formation of Uttarakhand.

== Electoral performances ==
Year	Election	Party	Constituency Name	Result	Votes gained	Vote share%	Margin
2002	1st Uttarakhand Assembly	Nationalist Congress Party	Rajpur	Lost	6,630	16.49%	7,437
2003	Dehradun Municipal Corporation	Nationalist Congress Party	Dehradun Mayor	Lost			
2007	2nd Uttarakhand Assembly	Nationalist Congress Party	Lansdowne	Lost	5,335	17.36%	7,564
2013	Dehradun Municipal Corporation	Indian National Congress	Dehradun Mayor	Lost	57,618	29.28%	22,912
2017	4th Uttarakhand Assembly	Indian National Congress	Dehradun Cantt	Lost	24,472	33.90%	16,670
2022	5th Uttarakhand Assembly	Indian National Congress	Dehradun Cantt	Lost	24,554	31.93%	20,938
