= Haldwani Municipal Corporation =

Civic body that governs the city of Haldwani in Uttarakhand, India

Haldwani Municipal Corporation हल्द्वानी नगर निगम Haldwani Nagar Nigam
- Unicameral Legislature

Type
- Type: Municipal Corporation

Leadership
- Mayor: Gajraj Singh Bisht, BJP since 7 February 2025
- Municipal Commissioner: Paritosh Verma, IAS

Structure
- Seats: 60
- Political groups: Government (36): BJP (23); IND (13); Opposition (16): INC (2); IND (14); Others (8): IND (8)

Elections
- Voting system: first-past-the-post
- Last election: 23 January 2025
- Next election: 2030

Meeting place
- Nagar Nigam Bhavan, Haldwani

Website
- Nagar Nigam Haldwani

The Haldwani Municipal Corporation is the civic body that governs the city of Haldwani in Uttarakhand, India.

== Structure ==
This corporation consists of 60 wards and is headed by a mayor who presides over a deputy mayor and 73 other corporators out of which 60 are elected directly through electoral constituencies called the wards. Another 10 are appointed by the governor of the state on recommendation of the state cabinet. And remaining four are the representatives of 3 MLAs and 1 MP who represents the city in state and central legislatures. The mayor is elected directly through a first-past-the-post voting system and the deputy mayor is elected by the corporators from among their numbers.

== List of mayors ==
S. No.	Name	Term			Party
1	Dr. Jogendra Pal Singh Rautela	3 May 2013	3 May 2018	5 years, 0 days	Bharatiya Janata Party
Administrator		3 May 2018	2 December 2018	212 days	Government of Uttarakhand
(1)	Dr. Jogendra Pal Singh Rautela	2 December 2018	2 December 2023	5 years, 0 days	Bharatiya Janata Party
Administrator		3 December 2023	7 February 2025	1 year, 67 days	Government of Uttarakhand
2	Gajraj Singh Bisht	7 February 2025	Incumbent	1 year, 185 days	Bharatiya Janata Party

== Current members ==
Haldwani Municipal Corporation has a total of 60 members or corporators, who are directly elected after a term of 5 years. The council is led by the Mayor. The latest elections were held in 23 January 2025. The current mayor of Haldwani is Gajraj Singh Bisht of the Bharatiya Janata Party.

Mayor: Gajraj Singh Bisht
Ward No	Ward Name	Name of Corporator	Party	Remarks
1	Ranibagh Kathgodam	Babli Verma	Independent	
2	Kathgodam Damuwadhunga	Nirmala Tiwari	Independent	
3	Haripur Colonel	Dharamveer	Bharatiya Janata Party	
4	Awas Vikas	Hema Bhatt	Independent	
5	Polysheet	Neha Adhikari	Bharatiya Janata Party	
6	Subhash Nagar Govindpura	Pankaj Tripathi	Independent	
7	Bhotiaparav Gorakhpur	Sachin Tiwari	Bharatiya Janata Party	
8	Jagdamba Nagar Kulyalpura	Ravi Valmiki	Independent	Resigned from UKD.
9	Talli Bamori	Rajendra Singh Jeena	Independent	
10	Malla Gorakhpur	Beena Chauhan	Independent	
11	Talla Gorakhpur	Ravi Joshi	Independent	
12	Rajendra Nagar	Priti Arya	Independent	
13	Rajpura Padav	Munni Kashyap	Independent	
14	Tanakpur Road	Dharamveer	Indian National Congress	
15	Kidwai Nagar	Salman Siddiqui	Independent	
16	Bazaar Kshetra	Prem Prakash Belwal	Bharatiya Janata Party	
17	Hiranagar	Shailendra Singh Danu	Independent	
18	Shivpuri Bhawani Ganj	Hargovind Singh Rawat	Independent	
19	Rampur Road	Rajendra Kumar	Bharatiya Janata Party	
20	Parvatiya Mohalla Himalaya Farm	Hemant Kumar Sharma	Independent	
21	Banbhoolpura Lines 1 to 7	Mohammad Gufran	Independent	
22	Banbhoolpura Lines 8 to 13	Ayesha Naaz	Independent	
23	Banbhoolpura Lines 14 to 16	Shahjahan Begum	Independent	
24	Ghafoor Basti Banbhoolpura	Saleem Saifi	Independent	
25	Banbhoolpura Lines 17 to 20	Seema Anjum	Independent	
26	Nayi Basti Banbhoolpura	Reshma Parveen	Independent	
27	Gandhinagar	Rohit Kumar	Independent	
28	Bareilly Road Dharmapura	Imran Khan	Independent	
29	Indira Nagar	Laeek Ahmed	Independent	
30	Indira Nagar South	Tahira Khatoon	Independent	
31	Company Bagh	Sameer Ansari	Independent	
32	Indira Nagar West	Faeem Jaiba Salmani	Independent	
33	Indira Nagar East	Nasreen	Independent	
34	Byura Dhamuwadhunga Bandobasti	Jyoti Pandey	Independent	
35	Jawahar Jyoti Anshik Dhamuwadhunga Bandobasti	Renu Tamta	Indian National Congress	
36	Jawahar Jyoti-1	Tanuja	Independent	
37	Jawahar Jyoti-2	Vidya Devi	Bharatiya Janata Party	
38	Bithoria	Manoj Bhatt	Bharatiya Janata Party	
39	Lohariasal Malla Dhar Bithoria	Mamata Joshi	Bharatiya Janata Party	
40	Lohariasal Talla Himmatpur Malla	Pramod Pant	Bharatiya Janata Party	
41	Bhagwanpur	Chandra Prakash	Bharatiya Janata Party	
42	Hari Nagar	Dheeraj Kumar Pandey	Bharatiya Janata Party	
43	Chhadayal	Pankaj Chuphal	Bharatiya Janata Party	
44	Kusum Khera West	Surendra Mohan Singh	Independent	
45	Kusum Khera East–Kohli Colony	Amit Singh	Independent	
46	Bithoria West	Naveen Chandra Joshi	Bharatiya Janata Party	
47	Bithoria East	Deepak Bisht	Bharatiya Janata Party	
48	Bamori Malli	Mukul Balyutia	Independent	
49	Bamori Bandobasti	Chandan Singh Mehta	Bharatiya Janata Party	
50	Adarsh Nagar	Neema Bhatt	Independent	
51	Mukhani-1	Mukesh Singh	Independent	
52	Mukhani-2	Rekha Binwal	Bharatiya Janata Party	
53	Mukhani-3	Rajesh Kumar Pant	Bharatiya Janata Party	
54	Mukhani-4	Harendra Singh Bisht	Independent	
55	Mukhani-5 – Manpur North	Amit Bisht	Bharatiya Janata Party	
56	Manpur	Bhagirathi	Independent	
57	Haldwani Talli – Manpur North	Rukmani Bisht	Bharatiya Janata Party	
58	Haldwani Talli	Manoj Joshi	Independent	
59	Gojajali North	Raees Ahmed	Independent	
60	Gojajali	Sanjay Pandey	Bharatiya Janata Party	

== Election results ==
The Haldwani Municipal Corporation holds direct elections every five years in the state and the latest elections were those held in the year 2025.

=== Mayoral ===
Year	No. of Wards	Winner				Runner Up				Margin
Year	No. of Wards	Party	Candidate	Votes	%	Party	Candidate	Votes	%	Margin
2025	60	Bharatiya Janata Party	Gajraj Singh Bisht	71,962	47.38	INC	Lalit Joshi	68,068	44.81	3,894

=== Ward-wise ===
==== 2025 ====
Haldwani Municipal Corporation
Party	Won	+/−
Bharatiya Janata Party	23	▼8
Independents	34	▲34
Indian National Congress	2	▼24
Uttarakhand Kranti Dal	1	Steady
Total	60	

== See also ==
- List of municipal corporations in Uttarakhand
- 2025 Haldwani Municipal Corporation election
