= Dehradun Municipal Corporation =

Civic body that governs the city of Dehradun in Uttarakhand, India

Dehradun Municipal Corporation देहरादून नगर निगम Dehradun Nagar Nigam
- Unicameral Legislature

Type
- Type: Municipal Corporation

Leadership
- Mayor: Saurabh Thapliyal, BJP since 7 February 2025
- Municipal Commissioner: Alok Kumar Pandey, IAS
- Deputy Municipal Commissioner: Gaurav Bhasin,
- Assistant Municipal Commissioner: Vijay Pratap Singh Chauhan; Vinod Lal; Rajbir Singh Chauhan

Structure
- Seats: 100
- Political groups: Government (65): BJP (65); Opposition (24): INC (24); Others (11): IND (11)

Elections
- Voting system: First-past-the-post
- Last election: 23 January 2025
- Next election: 2030

Meeting place
- Nagar Nigam Bhavan, Dehradun

Website
- Nagar Nigam Dehradun

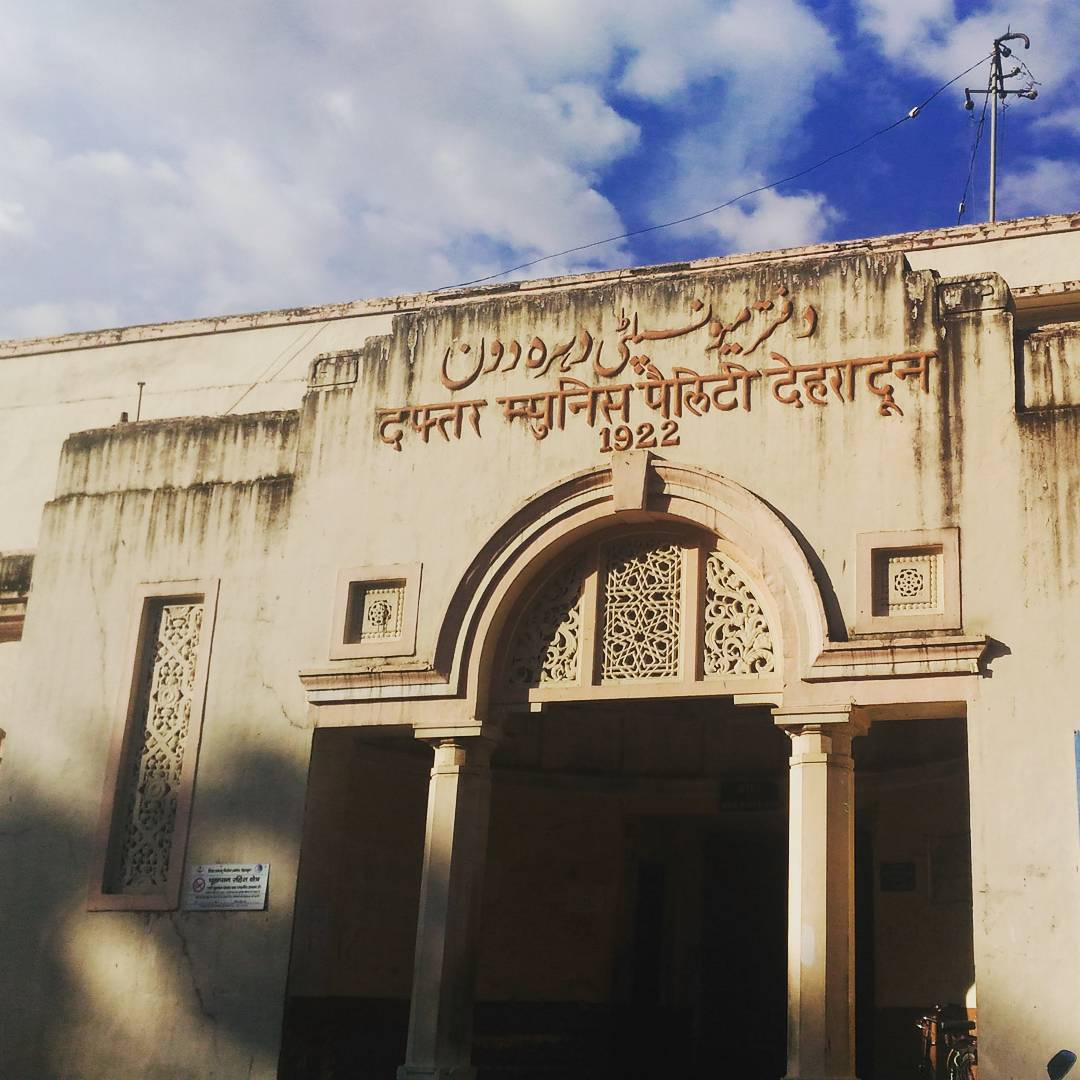
Dehradun municipality

The Dehradun Municipal Corporation is the civic or urban local body that governs the city of Dehradun in Uttarakhand, India. It is essentially the city government and differs from the MDDA (Mussoorie Dehradun Development Board), which is a state run organisation.

== Structure ==
This corporation consists of 100 wards and is headed by a mayor who presides over a deputy mayor and 99 other corporators representing the wards. The mayor is elected directly through a first-past-the-post voting system and the deputy mayor is elected by the corporators from among their numbers.

The Corporation is composed of elected officials like the mayor and corporator, administrative officials, like the Municipal Commissioner (also known as Chief Executive Officer) and technical officers who have expertise in various domains.

Prior to December 2003 this body was known as Dehradun Municipal Council and after revamping the municipality the Dehradun Municipal Corporation came into existence in 2003.

== List of chairpersons or commissioners of the Dehradun Municipal Council ==
S. No.	Name	Term		
1	Anant Narayan Tankha	1 November 1919	28 February 1923	3 years, 119 days
2	Ugrasen Singh	1 March 1923	13 January 1936	12 years, 318 days
3	Khurdesh Lal	14 January 1936	31 March 1940	4 years, 17 days
4	Ishtiali Ahmad	1 April 1940	15 April 1943	3 years, 14 days
5	Anand Swarup Garg	16 April 1943	15 April 1948	4 years, 365 days
6	B. N. Rai	30 October 1948	15 January 1949	77 days
7	Keshav Chand	15 January 1949	13 November 1953	4 years, 302 days
8	Indresh Charan Das	14 November 1953	23 November 1957	4 years, 9 days
9	Ram Swarup	14 November 1957	14 December 1964	7 years, 30 days
10	Brij Bhushan Singh	15 December 1964	19 April 1967	2 years, 125 days
11	Prem Prakash Sharma	30 April 1967	26 November 1967	210 days
12	Sushil Chand Jain	27 November 1967	31 August 1969	1 year, 277 days
13	Bhola Datt Saklani	26 December 1969	10 August 1977	7 years, 227 days
14	Dinanath Saluja	15 February 1989	7 February 1994	4 years, 357 days
15	Vinod Chamoli	5 March 1997	8 December 1998	1 year, 278 days

== List of mayors ==
S. No.	Name	Term			Party
1	Manorama Dobriyal Sharma	8 February 2003	7 February 2008	4 years, 364 days	Indian National Congress
Administrator		8 February 2008	2 May 2008	84 days	Government of Uttarakhand
2	Vinod Chamoli	3 May 2008	2 May 2013	10 years, 0 days	Bharatiya Janata Party
2	Vinod Chamoli	3 May 2013	3 May 2018	10 years, 0 days	Bharatiya Janata Party
Administrator		3 May 2018	2 December 2018	212 days	Government of Uttarakhand
3	Sunil Uniyal	2 December 2018	2 December 2023	5 years, 0 days	Bharatiya Janata Party
Administrator		2 December 2023	7 February 2025	1 year, 67 days	Government of Uttarakhand
4	Saurabh Thapliyal	7 February 2025	Incumbent	1 year, 113 days	Bharatiya Janata Party

== Current members ==
Dehradun Municipal Corporation has a total of 100 members or corporators, who are directly elected after a term of 5 years. The council is led by the Mayor. The latest elections were held in 23 January 2025. The current mayor of Dehradun is Saurabh Thapliyal of the Bharatiya Janata Party.

Mayor: Saurabh Thapliyal
Zone	Ward No.	Ward Name	Areas Covered	Assembly Constituency	Name of Councillor	Party	Remarks
	1	Malsi			Sumendra Singh Bohra	Indian National Congress	
	2	Vijaypur			Sagar Lama	Indian National Congress	
	3	Ranjhawala			Anil Chhetri	Indian National Congress	
	4	Rajpur			Mahima	Independent	
	5	Dhoran			Alpana Rana	Bharatiya Janata Party	
	6	Doon Vihar			Meenakshi Nautiyal	Bharatiya Janata Party	
	7	Jakhan			Arvind Chaudhary	Indian National Congress	
	8	Salawala			Bhupendra Kathait	Bharatiya Janata Party	
	9	Arya Nagar			Yogesh Ghaghat	Bharatiya Janata Party	
	10	Dobhal Wala			Mohan Bahuguna	Bharatiya Janata Party	
	11	Vijay Colony			Anup Kumar	Independent	
	12	Kishan Nagar			Nandini Sharma	Bharatiya Janata Party	
	13	D.L. Road			Barkha	Independent	
	14	Rispana			Rani Kaur	Bharatiya Janata Party	
	15	Karanpur			Ravi Kumar	Bharatiya Janata Party	
	16	Bakralwala			Ashok Dobariyal	Bharatiya Janata Party	
	17	Chukkhuwala			Arjun Sonkar	Indian National Congress	
	18	Indra Colony			Vanshika Sonkar	Bharatiya Janata Party	
	19	Ghanta Ghar Kalika Mandir			Santokh Nagpal	Bharatiya Janata Party	
	20	Race Course North			Virendra Singh	Indian National Congress	
	21	M.K.P.			Rohan Chandel	Bharatiya Janata Party	
	22	Tilak Road			Anita Garg	Bharatiya Janata Party	
	23	Khurbura			Lakshmi Kaur	Indian National Congress	
	24	Shivaji Marg			Vishal Kumar	Bharatiya Janata Party	
	25	Indrish Nagar			Manoj Kumar Jatav	Bharatiya Janata Party	
	26	Dhamawala			Pramod Kumar Gupta	Indian National Congress	
	27	Jhanda Mohalla			Vaibhav Agarwal	Bharatiya Janata Party	
	28	Dalanwala North			Kamla Devi	Indian National Congress	
	29	Dalanwala East			Nikhil Kumar	Indian National Congress	
	30	Dalanwala South			Sunita Manjkhola	Bharatiya Janata Party	
	31	Kaulaghar			Devaki Nautiyal	Bharatiya Janata Party	Defected to BJP
	32	Ballupur			Komal Vohra	Indian National Congress	
	33	Yamuna Colony			Sanjay Singhal	Bharatiya Janata Party	
	34	Govind Ghar			Mahendra Kaur Kukreja	Bharatiya Janata Party	
	35	Shri Dev Suman			Sangeeta Gupta	Indian National Congress	
	36	Vijay Park			Amita Singh	Bharatiya Janata Party	
	37	Basant Vihar			Ankit Agarwal	Bharatiya Janata Party	
	38	Panditwari			Abhishek Tiwari	Indian National Congress	
	39	Indra Nagar			Praveen Negi	Bharatiya Janata Party	
	40	Seema Dwar			Vinod Rawat	Independent	
	41	Indrapuram			Babita Gupta	Bharatiya Janata Party	
	42	Kanwali			Renu Gheyal	Bharatiya Janata Party	
	43	Dwanpuri			Rajni Devi	Bharatiya Janata Party	
	44	Patel Nagar West			Dolly Rani Mohan	Bharatiya Janata Party	
	45	Gandhi Gram			Meenakshi Maurya	Bharatiya Janata Party	
	46	Adhoiwala			Monika Chaudhary	Indian National Congress	
	47	Chandar Road			Ajay Tyagi	Indian National Congress	
	48	Badrish Colony			Kamli Bhatt	Bharatiya Janata Party	
	49	Bhagat Singh Colony			Abdul Rehman	Independent	
	50	Rajiv Nagar			Mahendra Singh Rawat	Indian National Congress	
	51	Bani Vihar			Trilok Bargali	Bharatiya Janata Party	
	52	Saraswati Vihar			Sohan Singh Rautela	Bharatiya Janata Party	
	53	Mata Mandir Road			Vimal Uniyal	Bharatiya Janata Party	
	54	Chandra Singh Garhwali Ajabpur			Rajni Dhaundiyal	Independent	
	55	Shah Nagar			Rakesh Kumar	Bharatiya Janata Party	
	56	Dharampur			Amit Bhandari	Indian National Congress	
	57	Nehru Colony			Vivek Kothari	Independent	
	58	Defence Colony			Devendra Gairola	Bharatiya Janata Party	
	59	Gujrara Mansingh			Sanjeet Bansal	Bharatiya Janata Party	
	60	Danda Lakhond			Abhishek Pant	Bharatiya Janata Party	
	61	Aamwala Tarla			Prashant Dobhal	Bharatiya Janata Party	
	62	Nunarkhera			Sumit Pundir	Bharatiya Janata Party	
	63	Ladpur			Dinesh Kemwal	Independent	
	64	Nehru Gram			Sushila	Bharatiya Janata Party	
	65	Dobhal Chowk			Vijay Lakshmi Negi	Bharatiya Janata Party	
	66	Raipur			Kapil Dhar	Bharatiya Janata Party	
	67	Mohkampur			Ravindra Singh Rawat	Bharatiya Janata Party	
	68	Chak Tun Wala Miya Wala			Pooja Negi	Bharatiya Janata Party	
	69	Ritha Mandi			Etat Khan	Indian National Congress	
	70	Lakkhi Bagh			Ayush Gupta	Indian National Congress	
	71	Patel Nagar East			Mahipal Dhiman	Bharatiya Janata Party	
	72	Dehrakhas			Alok Kumar	Bharatiya Janata Party	
	73	Vidhya Vihar			Ramesh Chandra Gaur	Bharatiya Janata Party	
	74	Bhrampuri			Satish Kashyap	Bharatiya Janata Party	
	75	Lohia Nagar			Mukeem Ahmed	Indian National Congress	
	76	Niranjanpur			Poonam Pundir	Bharatiya Janata Party	Defected to BJP
	77	Majra			Zahid Ansari	Indian National Congress	
	78	Turner Road			Kusum Verma	Indian National Congress	
	79	Bharuwala Grant			Deepak Negi	Bharatiya Janata Party	
	80	Rest Camp			Anjali Singhal	Bharatiya Janata Party	
	81	Race Course South			Rakhi Barthawal	Bharatiya Janata Party	
	82	Deep Nagar			Dinesh Prasad Sati	Bharatiya Janata Party	
	83	Kedarpur			Darshan Lal Binjola	Bharatiya Janata Party	
	84	Banjarawala			Ruchi	Independent	
	85	Mothrowala			Sobat Chand Ramola	Independent	
	86	Sewla Kalan			Manju Kaushik	Bharatiya Janata Party	
	87	Pithuwala			Pushkar Chauhan	Bharatiya Janata Party	
	88	Mehuwala-1			Tarannum	Indian National Congress	
	89	Mehuwala-2			Priya Verma	Indian National Congress	
	90	Mohobiwala			Sudhir Thapa	Bharatiya Janata Party	
	91	Chanderbani			Suman Butola	Bharatiya Janata Party	
	92	Arcadia-1			Anil Nautiyal	Bharatiya Janata Party	
	93	Arcadia-2			Kiran Yadav	Bharatiya Janata Party	
	94	Nathanpur-1			Meharban Singh Bhandari	Bharatiya Janata Party	
	95	Nathanpur-2			Ravindra Gusain	Bharatiya Janata Party	
	96	Nawada			Virendra Walia	Bharatiya Janata Party	
	97	Harrawala			Devi Dayal	Independent	
	98	Ballawala			Prashant Kharola	Bharatiya Janata Party	
	99	Nakrunda			Rahul Kumar	Bharatiya Janata Party	
	100	Nathuawala			Swati Dobhal	Bharatiya Janata Party	

== Election results ==
The Dehradun Municipal Corporation holds direct elections every five years in the state and the latest elections were those held in the year 2025.

=== Mayoral ===
Year	No. of Wards	Winner				Runner Up				Margin
Year	No. of Wards	Party	Candidate	Votes	%	Party	Candidate	Votes	%	Margin
2003	45	Indian National Congress	Manorama Dobriyal Sharma	50,511	34.29	Bharatiya Janata Party	Vinod Uniyal	46,202	30.4	4,309
2008	60	Bharatiya Janata Party	Vinod Chamoli	60,867	33.07	Independent	Rajni Rawat	44,294	24.06	16,573
2013	60	Bharatiya Janata Party	Vinod Chamoli	80,530	40.93	Indian National Congress	Suryakant Dhasmana	57,618	29.28	22,912
2018	100	Bharatiya Janata Party	Sunil Uniyal	1,62,516	46.41	Indian National Congress	Dinesh Agrawal	1,26,884	36.24	35,632
2025	100	Bharatiya Janata Party	Saurabh Thapliyal	2,42,229	58.29	Indian National Congress	Virendra Pokhriyal	1,36,535	32.86	1,05,694

=== Ward-wise ===
==== 2025 ====
Dehradun Municipal Corporation
Party	Won	+/−
Bharatiya Janata Party	63	▲3
Indian National Congress	24	▼10
Independents	13	▲7
Total	100	

==== 2018 ====
Dehradun Municipal Corporation
Party	Won	+/−
Bharatiya Janata Party	60	▲26
Indian National Congress	34	▲12
Independents	6	▲4
Total	100	

==== 2013 ====
Dehradun Municipal Corporation
Party	Won	+/−
Bharatiya Janata Party	34	▲6
Indian National Congress	22	▼2
Bahujan Samaj Party	2	▲1
Uttarakhand Kranti Dal	0	▼1
Independents	2	▼4
Total	60	

==== 2008 ====
Dehradun Municipal Corporation
Party	Won	+/−
Bharatiya Janata Party	28	▲12
Indian National Congress	24	▲1
Uttarakhand Kranti Dal	1	▲1
Bahujan Samaj Party	1	▲1
Independents	6	Steady
Total	60	

==== 2003 ====
Dehradun Municipal Corporation
Party	Won	+/−
Indian National Congress	23	▲23
Bharatiya Janata Party	16	▲16
Independents	6	▲6
Total	45	

== See also ==
- 2025 Dehradun Municipal Corporation election
- 2018 Dehradun Municipal Corporation election
- 2013 Dehradun Municipal Corporation election
- 2008 Dehradun Municipal Corporation election
- 2003 Dehradun Municipal Corporation election
