= Vinod Chamoli =

Indian politician

MLA Vinod Chamoli

Member of Legislative Assembly for Dharampur
- Incumbent
- Assumed office 2017

Mayor for Dehradun Municipal Corporation
- In office 3 May 2008 – 3 May 2018
- Preceded by: Government of Uttarakhand
- Succeeded by: Government of Uttarakhand

Personal details
- Born: 24 October 1961 (age 64)
- Party: Bharatiya Janata Party
- Profession: Business

Vinod Chamoli is an Indian politician from Uttarakhand and a member of the Uttarakhand Legislative Assembly. Chamoli represents the Dharampur (Uttarakhand Assembly constituency) as a member of the Bharatiya Janata Party. He was also a two term Mayor of Dehradun Municipal Corporation from 3 May 2008 till 3 May 2018. Chamoli represents the Dharampur (Uttarakhand Assembly constituency). Chamoli is a member of the Bharatiya Janata Party. Vinod Chamoli won 2022 assembly election and is two-time and current MLA from Dharampur seat.

He was criticised for retaining the mayor post after he was elected as an MLA, though he resigned from the post a year later.

== Elections contested ==
=== Uttarakhand Legislative Assembly ===
Year	Constituency	Result	Vote percentage	Opposition Candidate	Opposition Party	Opposition vote percentage	Ref
2017	Dharampur	Won	-	Dinesh Agarwal	INC	-	-
2022	Dharampur	Won	-	Dinesh Agarwal	INC	-	-

=== Dehradun Municipal Corporation ===
Year	Post	Result	Vote Percentage	Opposition Candidate	Opposition Party	Opposition Vote Percentage
2008	Mayor	Won	33.07%	Rajni Rawat	IND	24.06%
2013	Mayor	Won	40.93%	Suryakant Dhasmana	INC	29.29%
