= List of cities in Uttarakhand by population =

Locations of major cities in Uttarakhand

This is a list of urban agglomerations and cities of Uttarakhand with a population above 100,000, per the 2011 census of India:

Rank	Name	District	Type*	Image	Population 2011	Male	Female	Population below 5 yrs	Literacy Rate
1	Dehradun	Dehradun	UA		714,223	377,174	337,049	72,859	90.01
2	Haridwar	Haridwar	UA		310,562	165,667	144,895	36,319	85.43
3	Roorkee	Haridwar	UA		273,502	148,042	125,460	32,729	84.29
4	Haldwani-cum-Kathgodam	Nainital	UA		232,060	121,363	110,697	27,906	85.17
5	Rudrapur	Udham Singh Nagar	UA		154,485	81,527	72,958	21,443	74.91
6	Kashipur	Udham Singh Nagar	UA		121,610	63,625	57,985	14,381	83.40
7	Rishikesh	Dehradun	UA		102,138	54,466	47,692	11,507	86.86

== Urban Agglomeration ==
In the census of India 2011, an Urban Agglomeration has been defined as follows:

"An urban agglomeration is a continuous urban spread constituting a town and its adjoining outgrowths, or two or more physically contiguous towns together with or without outgrowths of such towns. An Urban Agglomeration must consist of at least a statutory town and its total population (i.e. all the constituents put together) should not be less than 20,000 as per the 2001 Census. In varying local conditions, there were similar other combinations which have been treated as urban agglomerations satisfying the basic condition of contiguity."

=== Constituents of Urban Agglomerations in Uttarakhand ===
The constituents of Urban Agglomerations in Uttarakhand with a population of 1 lakh or above, are noted below:

- Dehradun UA includes Dehradun (M Corp.), Bharuwala Grant (OG), Dehradun Cantonment (CB), FRI and College Area (CT), Raipur (CT), Natthanpur (CT), Natthuwala (CT) and Clement Town (CB).
- Haridwar UA includes Haridwar (M Corp.), BHEL Ranipur (IT), Gurukul Kangri (Part) (OG), Jwalapur Mahavidyalaya (Part) (OG), SIDCUL Haridwar (Part) (OG), Rawli Mahdud (CT) and Jagjitpur (CT).
- Haldwani-cum-Kathgodam UA includes Haldwani (M Corp.) Kathgodam (MC), Damua Dhunga Bandobasti (OG) - Ward No. 26, Byura (OG) - Ward No. 27, Bamori Talli Bandobasti, Amrawati Colony, Shakti Vihar, Bhatt Colony (OG) - Ward No. 28, Manpur Uttar (Palika Yatayat Nagar) (OG) - Ward No. 29, Haripur Sukhan (Van Cancer Hospital) (OG) - Ward No. 30, Gaujajali Uttar (Shishu Bharati Vidya Mandir) (OG) - Ward No. 31, Kusumkhera (OG) - Ward No. 32, Bithoria No. 1 (OG) - Ward No. 33, Korta (Chanmari Mohalla) (OG) - Ward No. 34 (Part), Bamori Malli (OG) - Ward No. 35 (Part), Bamori Talli Kham (OG) - Ward No. 36 (Part), Mukhani (CT) and Haldwani Talli (CT).
- Kashipur UA includes Kashipur (M Corp.), Mahua Kheraganj (Part) (MC) and Kachnal Gosain (Part) (CT).
- Roorkee UA includes Roorkee (M Corp.), Roorkee Cantonment (CB), Salempur Rajputan (CT), Landhaura (MC), Sunhaira (CT), Shafipur (CT), Khanjarpur (CT), Padali Gujjar (MC), Nagla Imarti (CT), Dhandera (MC) and Mohanpur Mohammadpur (CT).
- Rudrapur UA includes Rudrapur (M Corp.), Jagatpura (OG), SIDCUL Rudrapur (Part) (OG) and Rampura (Part) (OG).
- Rishikesh UA includes Rishikesh (M Corp.), IDPL Virbhadra (IT), Rishikesh (CT), Gumaniwala (CT) Shyampur (CT) and Khadri Kharak Maf (CT).

Abbreviations: M Corp. = Municipal Corporation, MC = Municipal Council, CB = Cantonment Board, NA = Notified Area, IT = Industrial Township, CT = Census Town, OG = Out Growth

== Urban Agglomeration constituents ==
Urban Agglomerations constituents with a population above 100,000 as per 2011 census are shown in the table below.

Urban Agglomeration	Name of Constituent	District	Type*	Population 2011	Male	Female	Population below 5 yrs	Literacy Rate
Dehradun	Dehradun	Dehradun	M Corp.	578,420	303,411	275,009	59,180	89.32
Haridwar	Haridwar	Haridwar	M Corp.	225,235	120,201	105,034	25,950	84.99
Haldwani-cum-Kathgodam	Haldwani	Nainital	M Corp.	156,060	81,918	74,142	19,783	81.75
Rudrapur	Rudrapur	Udham Singh Nagar	M Corp.	140,884	74,276	66,608	19,727	75.21
Kashipur	Kashipur	Udham Singh Nagar	M Corp.	121,610	63,625	57,985	14,381	83.40
Roorkee	Roorkee	Haridwar	M Corp.	273,502	63,508	54,580	11,596	90.70
Rishikesh	Rishikesh	Dehradun	M Corp.	102,469	54,650	47,819	11,799	86.22

== Municipal Corporations ==
Rank	Name	District	Population 2011
1	Dehradun Municipal Corporation	Dehradun	578,420
2	Haridwar Municipal Corporation	Haridwar	225,235
3	Haldwani Municipal Corporation	Nainital	156,060
4	Rudrapur Municipal Corporation	Udham Singh Nagar	140,884
5	Kashipur Municipal Corporation	Udham Singh Nagar	121,610
6	Roorkee Municipal Corporation	Haridwar	118,188
7	Rishikesh Municipal Corporation	Dehradun	102,138
8	Kotdwar Municipal Corporation	Pauri Garhwal	1,75,232
9	Pithoragarh Municipal Corporation	Pithoragarh	56,044
10	Almora Municipal Corporation	Almora	34,122
11	Srinagar Municipal Corporation	Pauri Garhwal	20,115

== Municipal Councils ==
Rank	Name	District	Population 2011
1	Ramnagar	Nainital	54,787
2	Manglaur	Haridwar	52,971
3	Jaspur	Udham Singh Nagar	50,523
4	Kichha	Udham Singh Nagar	41,965
5	Nainital	Nainital	41,377
6	Mussoorie	Dehradun	30,118
7	Sitarganj	Udham Singh Nagar	29,965
8	Bajpur	Udham Singh Nagar	25,524
9	Pauri	Pauri Garhwal	25,440
10	Tehri	Tehri Garhwal	24,014
11	Nagla	Udham Singh Nagar	22,258
12	Laksar	Haridwar	21,760
13	Gopeshwar	Chamoli	21,447
14	Chiliyanaula	Almora	20,441
15	Gadarpur	Udham Singh Nagar	19,301
16	Tanakpur	Champawat	17,626
17	Uttarkashi	Uttarkashi	17,475
18	Jyotirmath	Chamoli	16,709
19	Chinyalisaur	Uttarkashi	15,093
20	Khatima	Udham Singh Nagar	15,500
21	Vikasnagar	Dehradun	13,927
22	Mahua Kheraganj	Udham Singh Nagar	12,584
23	Shivalik Nagar	Haridwar	11,175
24	Muni Ki Reti	Tehri Garhwal	10620
25	Herbertpur	Dehradun	9782
26	Rudraprayag	Rudraprayag	9,313
27	Bageshwar	Bageshwar	9,079
28	Gauchar	Chamoli	8864
29	Doiwala	Dehradun	8,709
30	Karnaprayag	Chamoli	8,297
31	Lohaghat	Champawat	7,926
32	Chamba	Tehri Garhwal	7,771
33	Bhimtal	Nainital	7,722
34	Kaladhungi	Nainital	7611
35	Gangolihat	Pithoragarh	7112
36	Dharchula	Pithoragarh	7039
37	Barkot	Uttarkashi	6720
38	Didihat	Pithoragarh	6522
39	Bhowali	Nainital	6,309
40	Narendranagar	Tehri Garhwal	6,049
41	Berinag	Pithoragarh	5,195
42	Champawat	Champawat	4801
43	Dugadda	Pauri Garhwal	2,422
44	Purola	Uttarkashi	2,394
45	Devprayag	Tehri Garhwal	2152

== Notified Areas (Nagar Panchayats) ==
Rank	Name	District	Population 2011
1	Dhandera	Haridwar	23,276
2	Selakui	Dehradun	22,583
3	Landhaura	Haridwar	18,370
4	Rampur	Haridwar	17,821
5	Sultanpur Adampur	Haridwar	16,042
6	Padali Gujjar	Haridwar	12,901
7	Dineshpur	Udham Singh Nagar	11,343
8	Jhabrera	Haridwar	11,186
9	Kela Khera	Udham Singh Nagar	10,929
10	Piran Kaliyar	Haridwar	10,043
11	Sultanpur	Udham Singh Nagar	9,881
12	Nanakmatta	Udham Singh Nagar	8,470
13	Banbasa	Champawat	7,990
14	Ghansali	Tehri Garhwal	7,775
15	Lalkuan	Nainital	7,644
16	Bhagwanpur	Haridwar	7,573
17	Mahua Dabra Haripura	Udham Singh Nagar	7,326
18	Gairsain	Chamoli	7,138
19	Shaktigarh	Udham Singh Nagar	6,309
20	Imlikera	Haridwar	6,304
21	Garhinegi	Udham Singh Nagar	5,497
22	Munsiyari	Pithoragarh	5,307
23	Kapkot	Bageshwar	5060
24	Garur	Bageshwar	5002
25	Pokhari	Chamoli	<5,000
26	Swargashram	Pauri Garhwal	4,669
27	Chaukhutia	Almora	4464
28	Lalpur	Udham Singh Nagar	3,975
29	Satpuli	Pauri Garhwal	3,874
30	Pipalkoti	Chamoli	3,767
31	Agastmuni	Rudraprayag	3,267
32	Tapovan	Tehri Garhwal	3,227
33	Thalisain	Pauri Garhwal	2,900
34	Nandanagar	Chamoli	2,839
35	Dwarahat	Almora	2,749
36	Chamilyala	Tehri Garhwal	2,602
37	Naugaon	Uttarkashi	2,516
38	Badrinath	Chamoli	2,438
39	Ukhimath	Rudraprayag	2,296
40	Bhikiyasain	Almora	2,232
41	Gaja	Tehri Garhwal	2,164
42	Tharali	Chamoli	1,956
43	Nandaprayag	Chamoli	1,641
44	Pati	Champawat	1,559
45	Kirtinagar	Tehri Garhwal	1,517
46	Guptkashi	Rudraprayag	1,130
47	Gularbhoj	Udham Singh Nagar	794
48	Lamgaon	Tehri Garhwal	650
49	Kedarnath	Rudraprayag	612
50	Tilwara	Rudraprayag	455
51	Gangotri	Uttarkashi	110

== Cantonment Boards ==
Rank	Name	District	Population 2011
1	Dehradun Cantonment	Dehradun	52,716
2	Clement Town	Dehradun	22,557
3	Ranikhet	Almora	18,886
4	Roorkee Cantonment	Haridwar	14,689
5	Lansdowne	Pauri Garhwal	5,667
6	Chakrata	Dehradun	5,117
7	Landour	Dehradun	3,539
8	Nainital Cantonment	Nainital	1,398
9	Almora Cantonment	Almora	1,391

== Census Towns ==
Rank	Name	District	Population 2011
1	Raipur	Dehradun	32,900
2	Mukhani	Nainital	22,475
3	Umru Khurd	Udham Singh Nagar	20,593
4	Dhalwala	Tehri Garhwal	18,016
5	Rawli Mahdud	Haridwar	17,467
6	Jagjitpur	Haridwar	15,043
7	Mohanpur Mohammadpur	Haridwar	14,394
8	Natthanpur	Dehradun	13,905
9	Mehuwala Mafi	Dehradun	13,475
10	Sunhaira	Haridwar	13,248
11	Fatehpur Range	Nainital	12,791
12	Jivangarh	Dehradun	11,870
13	Bandia	Udham Singh Nagar	11,392
14	Shafipur	Haridwar	11,135
15	Maholia	Udham Singh Nagar	10,965
16	Kashirampur	Pauri Garhwal	10,837
17	Salempur Rajputan	Haridwar	10,340
18	Bahadrabad	Haridwar	10,096
19	Haripur Kalan	Dehradun	10,367
20	Padampur Sukhron	Pauri Garhwal	9,802
21	Pratitnagar	Dehradun	9,564
22	Natthuwala	Dehradun	9,206
23	Bangheri Mahabatpur	Haridwar	8,583
24	Khadri Kharak Maf	Dehradun	8,404
25	Haldwani Talli	Nainital	8,159
26	Gumaniwala	Dehradun	6,953
27	Khanjarpur	Haridwar	6,435
28	Nagla Imarti	Haridwar	5,774
29	Shahpur	Haridwar	5,684
30	Saidpura	Haridwar	5,640
31	Khatyari	Almora	5,166
32	Jonk	Pauri Garhwal	4,669
33	Kachnal Gosain	Udham Singh Nagar	4,632

== See also ==
- List of urban local bodies in Uttarakhand
- List of metropolitan areas in India
- List of cities in India by population
- List of municipal corporations in India
