= Mohanpur =

Mohanpur may refer to:

== India ==
=== Bihar ===
- Mohanpur, Darbhanga, a village in Darbhanga district
- Mohanpur, Begusarai, a village in Begusarai district
- Mohanpur, Saharsa, a village in Saharsa
- Mohanpur, Madhubani, a village in Madhubani

=== Punjab ===
- Mohanpur, Ludhiana, a village in Ludhiana district
- Mohanpur, Tarn Taran, a city in Tarn Taran district

=== West Bengal ===
- Mohanpur, Paschim Medinipur, a village, with a police station, in Paschim Medinipur district
- Mohanpur (community development block), a division in West Midnapore district
- Mohanpur, Nadia, a village in Nadia district
- Mohanpur, North 24 Parganas, a census town in North 24 Parganas district
- Mohanpur, Diamond Harbour, a census town in South 24 Parganas district
- Mohanpur, Jhargram, a village in Jhargram district

=== Other states ===
- Mohanpur, Rewari, a village in Bawal Tehsil in Rewari district, Haryana
- Mohanpur, Deoghar, a community development block in Deoghar district, Jharkhand
- Mohanpur, Khiron, a village in Raebareli district, Uttar Pradesh
- Mohanpur, Uttar Pradesh, a town in Etah district, Uttar Pradesh
- Mohanpur State, a princely state under the Mahi Kantha Agency, Gujarat
- Mohanpur, Tripura
- Mohanpur Mohammadpur, or Mohanpur, Uttarakhand

== Nepal ==
- Mohanpur, Sarlahi, a village in the southeast
- Mohanpur, Saptari, a village in the southeast

== Bangladesh ==
- Mohanpur Upazila, Rajshahi District

== See also ==
- Mohanpur Mohammadpur, a town in Hardwar district, Uttarakhand, India
