= List of educational institutions in Rudrapur, Uttarakhand =

Following is the list of educational institutions in Rudrapur, Uttarakhand.

NEW WOODLAND ACADEMY JUNIOR HIGH SCHOOL

== All Schools Rudrapur City ==
| Name | Established | Locality | Type | Affiliation |
|---|---|---|---|---|
| St. Mary's Senior Secondary School | 1992 | Gangapur Road. | Private School | CBSE |
| Aditya Nath Jha Govt. Inter College | 1952 | Faizal Pur Mahrola | Government | Uttarakhand Board |
| Amenity Public School | 2004 | Kashipur rd. | Private | CBSE |
| Bal Bharti Inter College | 1976 | Kashipur Bypass rd. | Private | Uttarakhand Board |
| Bhanju Ram Amar Inter College | 1977 | Bhoorarani | Private | |
| Bhanu Pratap Memorial Public School | | Dashmesh Nagar | Private | |
| Bhartiyam International School | 2012 | Rameshwarpur | Private | CBSE |
| Blooming Dales' Modern School | 1996 | Dibdiba | Private | CBSE |
| Columbus Public School | 1997 | Soyam, Ayush and Kandari King | Private | CBSE |
| Sanskriti International Academy | 2014 | Shantipuri, U.S.Nagar, UK | Private | Uttarakhand Board |
| Confluence World School | 2012 | Kiccha rd. | Private | CISCE |
| DAV Public School | 1989 | Lalpur | Private | Arya Samaj / CBSE |
| Delhi Public School | 2017 | Kotha | Private | CBSE |
| Govt Inter College, Bagwala | 1960 | Bagwala | Government | Uttarakhand Board |
| G.D Goenka Public School | 2018 | Dibdiba | Private | |
| G.R.D. International School | | Abhijeet King School | Private | CBSE |
| G.S.M Public School | | Fulsunga | Private | CBSE |
| Holy Child School | 1999 | Bharatpur | Private | CBSE |
| Jain Global School | | Kashipur Road | Private | CBSE |
| Janta Inter College | 1955 | Janta School rd. | Private (Government Aided) | Uttarakhand Board |
| Jawahar Navodaya Vidyalaya | 1986 | Kashipur rd. | Government | CBSE |
| Jaycees Public School | 1985 | Gangapur rd. | Private | CBSE |
| Kids Planet School | 2003 | Bhurarani | Private | |
| Krishna Inter College | 2004 | Bengali Colony | Government | Uttarakhand Board |
| Maharishi Vidhya Mandir | 1992 | Shimla Pistaur | Private | CBSE |
| Mount Litera Zee School | | Bhamrola | Private | CBSE |
| The Oxford Academy | 1998 | Kicchha bypass rd. | Private | CBSE |
| NEW WOODLAND ACADEMY JUNIOR HIGH SCHOOL | 1997 | Transit camp Krishna Colony Mr.Devki_Nandan School Online Work senior assistant | Private | CBSE |
| | 1993 | Adarsh Colony | Private | CBSE |
| Saraswati Shishu Mandir Inter College | 1956 | Kalyani View, Nainital Road | Private | Uttarakhand Board |
| Saraswati Vidya Mandir Inter College | 1987 | Adarsh Colony | Private | Uttarakhand Board |
| Sarv Sanskriti School | 2013 | Bilaspur rd. | Private | CBSE |
| Sharda Public School | | | | |
| Shree Guru Nanak Girls Inter College | 1963 | Guru Nanak rd. | Private (Government Aided) | Uttarakhand Board |
| Shree Guru Nanak Public School | 1975 | Adarsh Colony | Private | CBSE |
| Shree Sanatan Dharm Kanya Inter College | | | | Uttarakhand Board |
| St. Mark School | 2012 | Preet Vihar | Private | CBSE |
| V.D. Singh Memorial School | | | | |
| Knowledge Park A Pre. School | | Hans Vihar | Bhurarani | |

== Institutes ==
Colleges and Institutes in Rudrapur
| Name | Established | Locality | Type | Affiliation |
|---|---|---|---|---|
| Rudrapur Institute of Technology | 2013 | Rudrapur | Private | - |
| ICCS Computer Education and Institute for Spoken English | 1999 | Rudrapur | Private | - |
| Devsthali Vidyapeeth College | 2005 | Lalpur | Private | Kumaun University, Nainital |
| Devbhumi College of Education for Women | 2005 | Lalpur | Private | Kumaun University, Nainital |
| Droan B.Ed. college for Women | 2006 | Dineshpur rd. | Private | Kumaun University, Nainital |
| Chanakya Law College | 2004 | Bhamrola | Private | Kumaun University, Nainital |
| Keshav Suryamukhi College of Education | | Shakti Farm | Private | Kumaun University, Nainital |
| Saraswati Institute of Management & Technology | 2004 | Premnagar | Private | Kumaun University, Nainital |
| Sardar Bhagat Singh Government Post Graduate College | 1974 | Rampur rd. | Government | Kumaun University, Nainital |
| Shri Guru Nanak Degree College | | Preet Vihar | Private | Kumaun University, Nainital |
| Shri Sanatan Dharm Govt.Girls Degree College | | | | Kumaun University, Nainital |
| Unity Law College | 2008 | Jafarpur | Private | Kumaun University, Nainital |
