= Rudrapur, Uttarakhand =

Rudrapur
- City
- Nagar Nigam Rudrapur
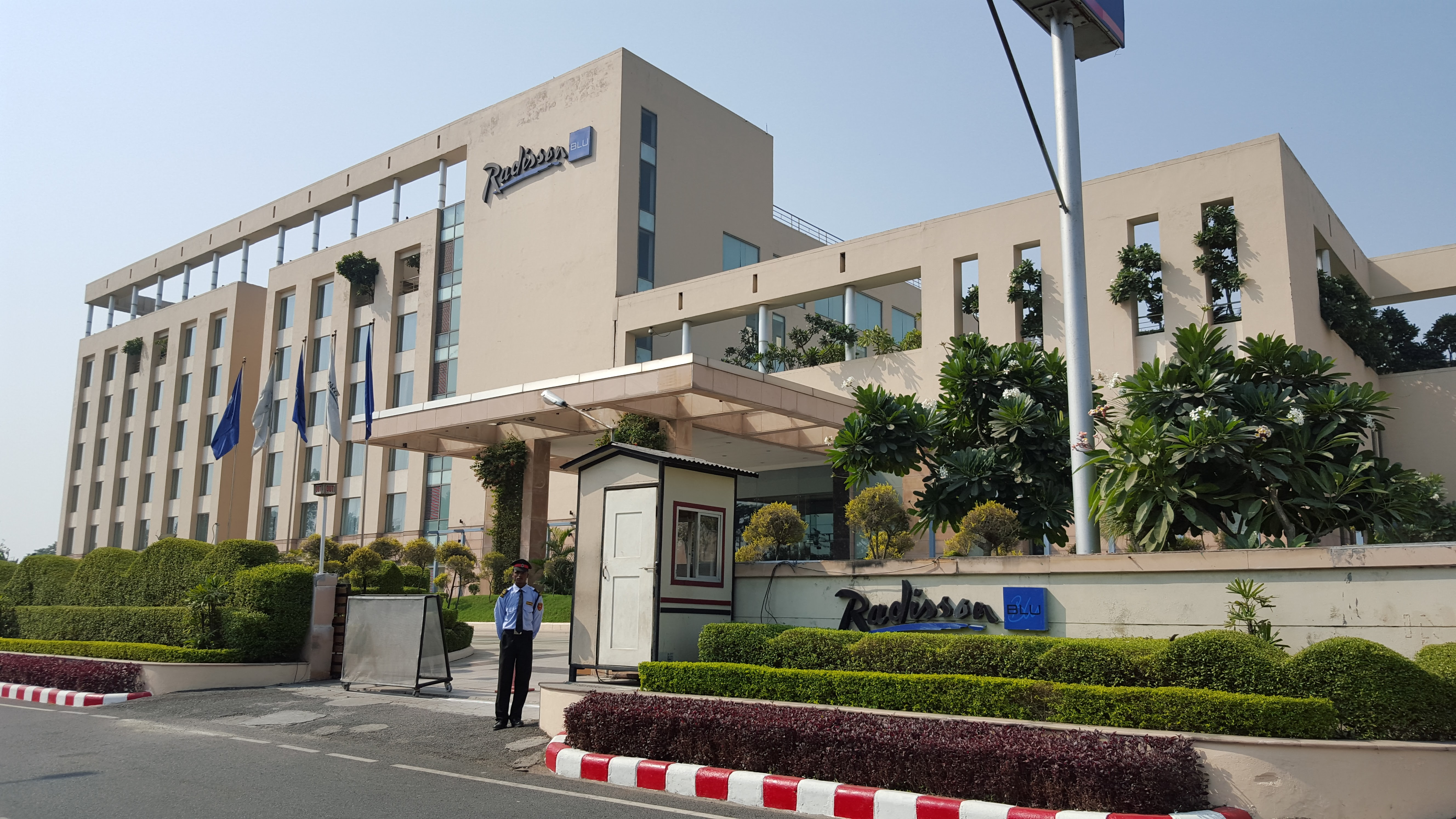
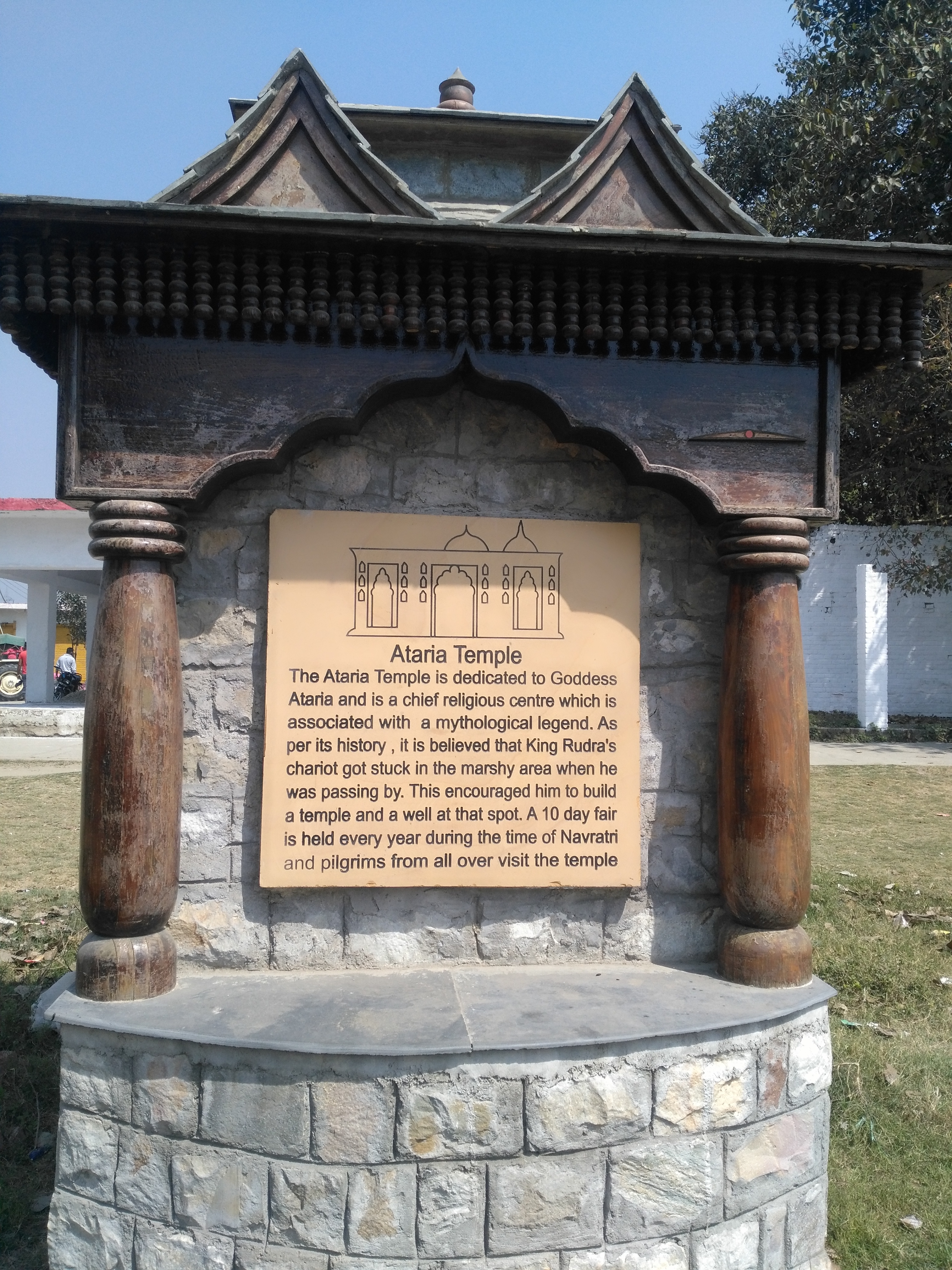
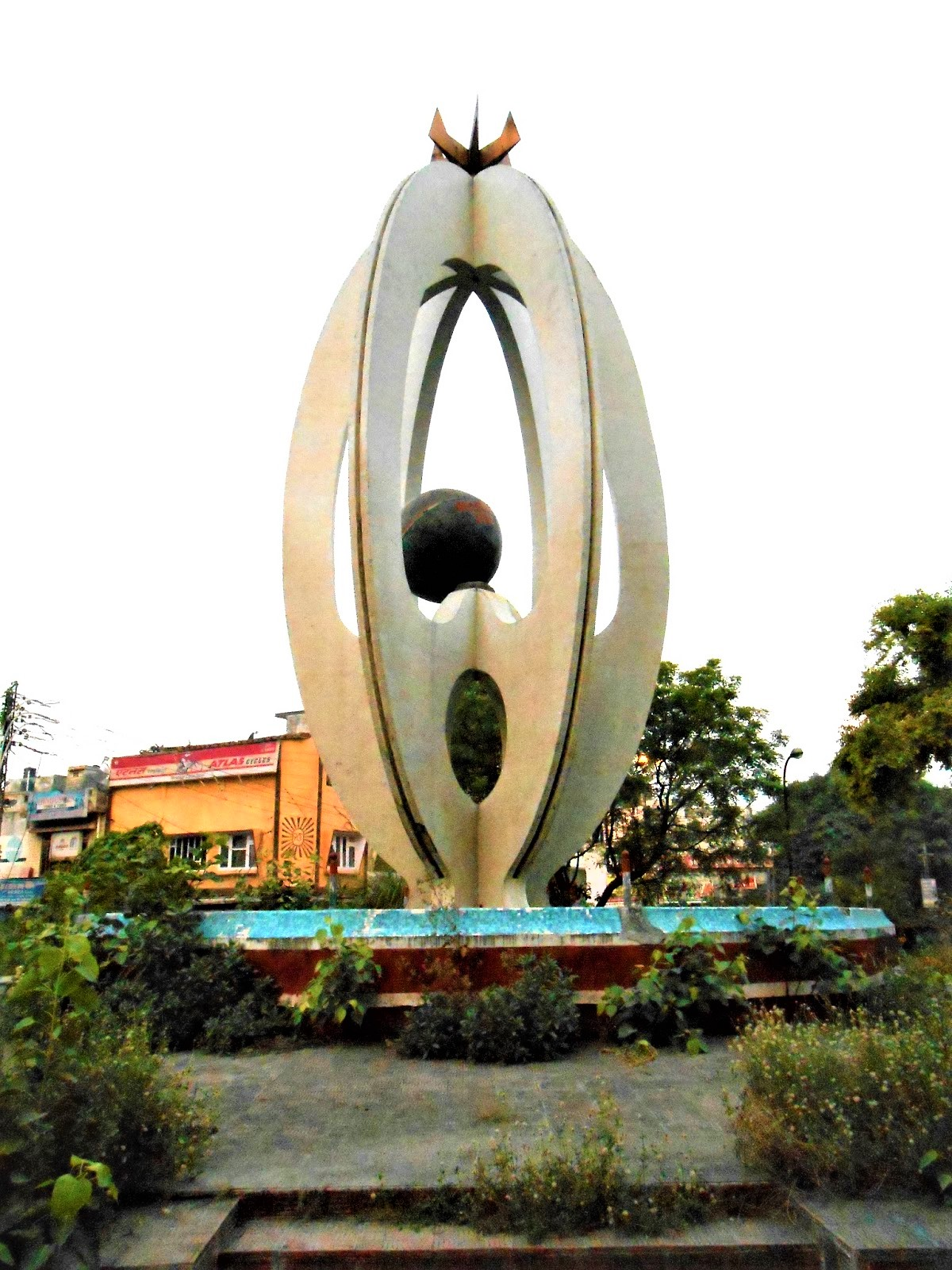
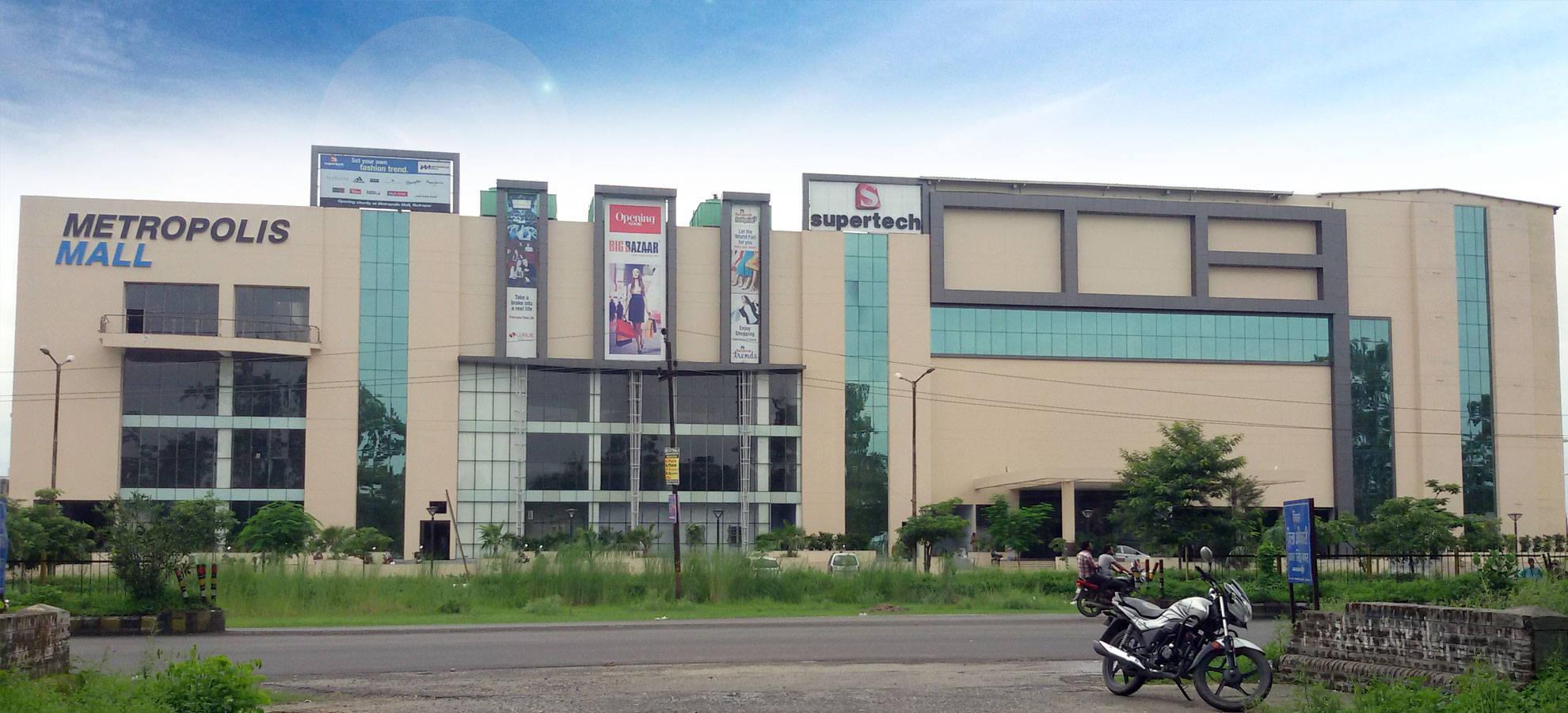
- Clockwise from top: Radisson Hotel, Gandhi Park, Metropolis mall and Atariya temple.

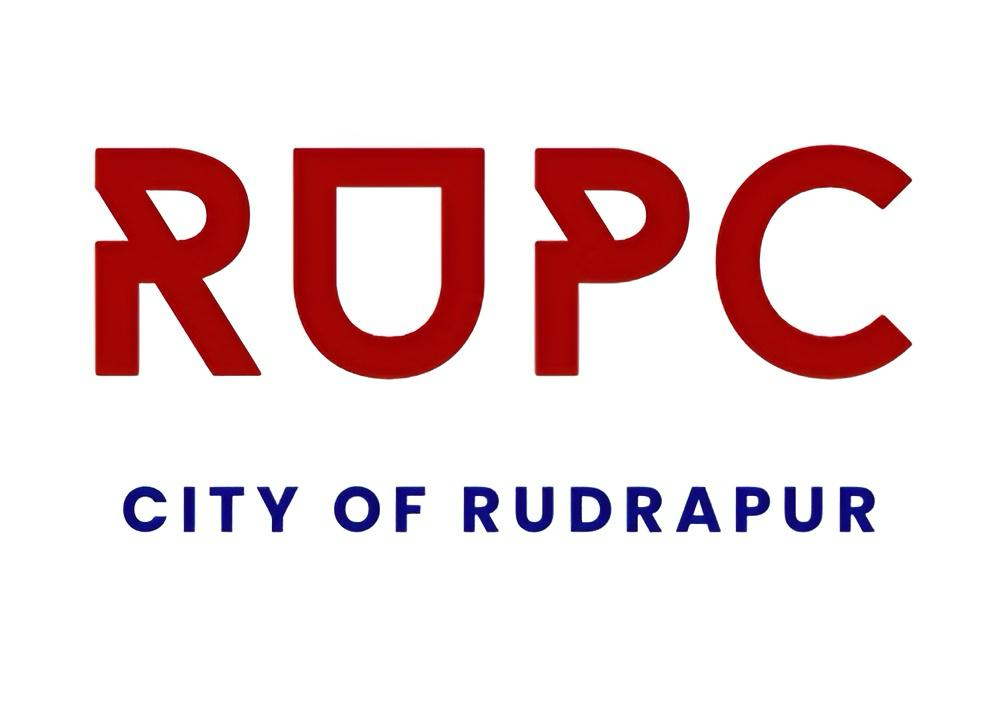
- Seal

- Location in Uttarakhand, India Rudrapur (India)
- Coordinates: 28°58′29.127″N 79°23′47.273″E
- Country: India
- State: Uttarakhand
- District: Udham Singh Nagar
- Founded: 1588
- Municipality: 1942
- Founder: Rudra Chand
- Named for: Raja Shri Shri Rudra Chand

Government
  - Type: Municipal Corporation
  - Body: Rudrapur Municipal Corporation
  - Mayor: Vikas Sharma (BJP)
  - Lok Sabha MP: Ajay Bhatt (BJP)
  - MLA: Shiv Arora (BJP)
  - Municipal Commissioner: Mahesh Chandra Pathak, IAS

Area
  - City: 47.65 km^{2} (18.40 sq mi)
- Elevation: 217 m (712 ft)

Population (2011)
  - City: 140,857
  - Rank: 1st in District, 2nd in Kumaon, 5th in State
  - Density: 2,956/km^{2} (7,656/sq mi)
  - Metro: 154,554
- Demonym: Rudrapuri

Languages
  - Official: Hindi
  - Native: Bengali; Khariboli; Kumaoni; Punjabi; Tharu
- Time zone: UTC+5:30 (IST)
- PIN: 263153
- Telephone code: +91-5944
- Vehicle registration: UK-06
- Website: nagarnigamrudrapur.com

Rudrapur is a city that serves as the headquarters of the Udham Singh Nagar district in the Indian state of Uttarakhand. Located at a distance of about 250 km (160 mi) northeast of New Delhi and 250 km (160 mi) south of Dehradun, Rudrapur is located in the fertile Terai plains in the southern part of Kumaon division over an area of 27.65 km^{2}. With a population of 140,857 according to the 2011 census of India, it is the 5th most populous city of Uttarakhand.

Rudrapur was established in the 16th century by King Rudra Chand of Kumaon to serve as the seat of the governor of the southern Tarai plains of the kingdom. Since the establishment of the SIDCUL industrial area in its vicinity, the city has undergone rapid development, along with literacy growth and higher employment. Rudrapur is a major industrial and educational hub of the state.

In this area, some artesian water wells produce water under pressure and no pump is required. However, in the last two decades, this auto-flow system has drastically declined, leading Rudrapur into a groundwater crisis.

== Etymology ==
The name "Rudrapur" comprises two words "Rudra" and "Pur". It is believed to be named after the King Rudra Chandra who was handed over this region by the Emperor Akbar in 1588. Pur is a placename element common to the Indian subcontinent which is derived from the Sanskrit word 'pura' which refers to a city or settlement.

== History ==
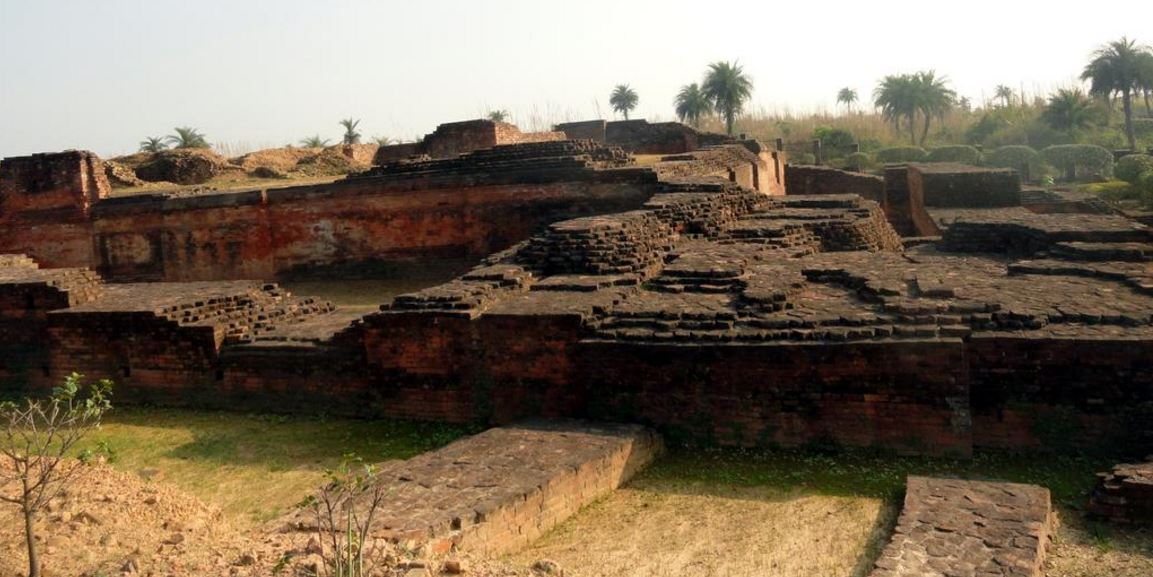
Ruins of the Ancient city of Govisana at Kashipur. Govisana is the earliest known settlement in the region, visited by the Chinese pilgrim Xuanzang in the 7th century.

The Terai area, where Rudrapur is located was considered an impenetrable forest for much of the ancient period. Marshy land, extreme heat, rains which lasted months, wild animals, diseases and no means of transportation prevented people from settling here. No historical settlements, except Govishana (50 kilometres (31 mi) northwest of the city), has been recorded in the area.

Mughal historians mention that the Chand ruler of Champawat, Gyan Chand, visited Delhi Sultanate and received the regions of Bhabar–Terai up to the Ganges as a grant from then Sultan; thus bringing it under the Kingdom of Kumaon. This area remained under local chieftains; it was Kirti Chand (1488–1503), who first ruled the Terai area, along with the rest of Kumaon.

Rudrapur town was established in the 16th century by King Rudra Chand of Almora. It was the residence of the Adhikari (Governor) of Tarai, till the town of Kashipur was Established in 1718. The Kumaoni Army, under Shiv Deo Joshi faced severe defeat during the Battle of Rudrapur, that was fought between Chands and Rohillas in AD 1744. Later, King Deep chand built a fort at Rudrapur to keep vigil over the Rohillas.

By the end of Eighteenth century, Nand Ram, the Adhikari of Kashipur, murdered the governor of Rudrapur, Manorath Joshi, and declared himself the de facto ruler of the low-lying Terai land, with his capital at Kashipur. After the fall of Almora in 1790, Rudrapur and its surrounding areas were ceded to the Nawab of Oudh, who remained its suzerain until the British occupation in 1801.

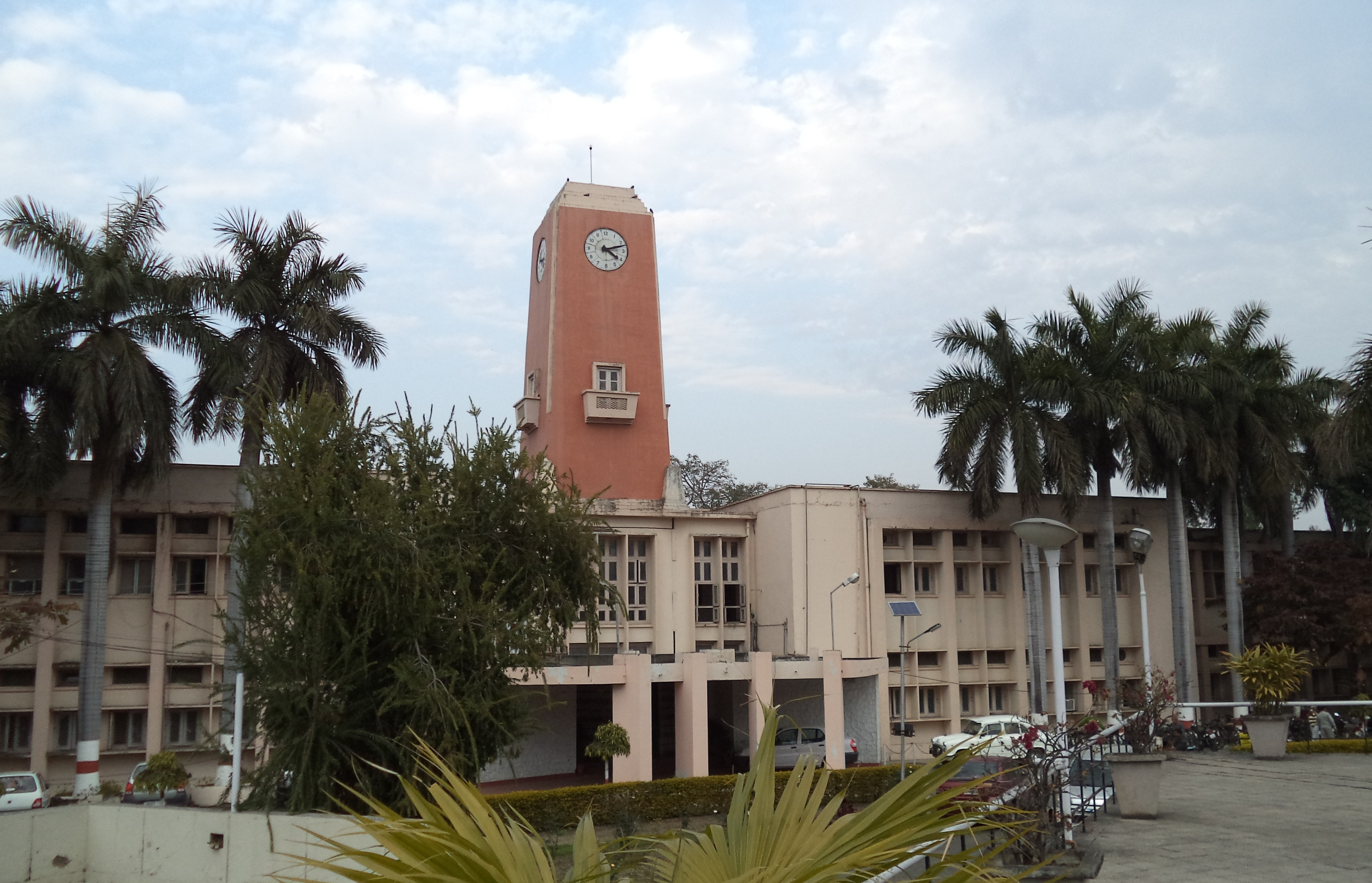
Uttar Pradesh Agricultural University, which was inaugurated by Jawaharlal Nehru on 17 November 1960, is situated at Pantnagar near Rudrapur.

In 1837, Rudrapur was annexed to the collectorate of Rohilkhand. Rudrapur was brought under Kumaon Division in 1858, however it was brought back to Rohilkhand division in 1861. In 1864–65 the whole Tarai and Bhabar was put under "Tarai and Bhawar Government Act" which was governed directly by the British crown. In 1891, the Tarai district was dismantled, and Rudrapur was put in the newly created Nainital district. Post independence Rudrapur and other parts of Nainital district were merged with United Provinces, which was later renamed the state of Uttar Pradesh. Uttar Pradesh Agricultural University, the first agricultural university of India, was established near Rudrapur on 17 November 1960. The university was inaugurated by Jawaharlal Nehru, and soon became a significant force in the development and transfer of High Yielding Variety seeds and related technology.

After Operation Blue Star in 1984, several Sikh extremists fled Punjab and took refuge in U.P. Tarai. Subsequently, several cases of explosions and Bombings were reported in 1991. A bomb blast occurred in Rudrapur market in mid 1991, and another bomb in a state roadways bus was defused in the nick of time. On 17 October 1991, Two bombs exploded at Ramlila celebration in the town, killing 41 people and wounding more than 140. Later, two members of the Khalistan Commando force were shot dead by a joint team of the commandos of the National Security Guard and the Delhi Police.

By 1994, the demand for separate statehood for Uttarakhand achieved almost unanimous acceptance among both the local populace and political parties all over the region. Rudrapur was made the headquarter of the district of Udham Singh Nagar, which was carved out from the Nainital district on 30 September 1995. After the Parliament of India passed the Uttar Pradesh Reorganisation Act, 2000 on 9 November 2000, Rudrapur became a part of Uttarakhand, the 27th state of the Republic of India.

== Culture and cityscape ==
=== Culture and lifestyle ===
The land lends itself to different forms of agriculture, giving rise to agriculture related activities and industry. Pantnagar University is a place of learning in the fields of agriculture and technology.

Bengali, Bhojpuri, Punjabi & Baniya community is a major community in Rudrapur . Punjabi & Baniya community people came here during the partition of India at 1947. The first refugee in this City who was settled and allotted land by an Indian Government, who was Merchant and Farmer Late. Gurumukh Ram Chhabra ji (Kanakpur Village), All refugees from Pakistan after division were settled here by Indian government in lait 1948. The Punjabi culture is also affecting the regional culture and in return getting affected by it.

The history of development started with 1948, when the problem of partition brought the refugee problem with it. Immigrants from north west and eastern areas were re-established in 164.2 square km land area under "Uttar Pradesh nivesh yojana". Individual citizens were not allotted land in accordance with crown grant act. The first batch of immigrants came in December 1948.

People from Kashmir, Punjab, Kerala, Eastern UP, Garhwal, Kumaon, Bengal, Haryana, Rajasthan and Nepal live in groups in this district. This community is an example of unity in diversity with people from many religions and professions and so is the Tarai, which has its heart at Rudrapur.

=== Landmark ===
Rudrapur is known as the 'Gateway to Kumaon', which is in close proximity to regional attractions like Nainital, Corbett National Park, Bhimtal and Almora. The city itself has numerous ancient monuments spread through the city, though not maintained in the best condition. Rudrapur is lined with suburbs around the city which offer spiritual relief to those who visit the city.

==== Nanak Matta Gurudwara ====
Nanakmatta (also called, Gurdwara Sri Nanak Matta Sahib Ji) is an important Sikh pilgrimage centre, located at Nanakmatta. It is located on the Rudrapur–Tanakpur route, 17 km from Khatima and 56 km from the Rudrapur district headquarters. The gurudwara is named after Guru Nanak Dev Ji, the first Sikh guru, who is believed to have visited the place on his way to Kailash Parvat in 1515 AD. The gurudwara is a sacred place for the Sikh community and is visited by thousands of pilgrims year-round.

=== Local attractions ===
==== Nanak Matta Dam ====
Located close to the Nanak Matta Gurudwara, is the Nanak Matta Dam which is built over the Saryu river. The area around the Nanak Matta Dam with its rich greens, still lake waters and fresh air, serve as a picnic spot for the locals and tourists, where one can enjoy boating and fishing.

==== Atariya Temple ====
Atariya Temple is an old temple with mythological significance, which is locally preached. The temple encompasses a sacred shrine dedicated to the deity goddess Atariya. The temple is known for its 10-day fair held during sacred Navratras week during which the pilgrims visit the shrine in thousands. Atariya Temple is located at a distance of 2 km from the Rudrapur bus stand.

==== Metropolis Mall ====
The Metropolis Mall in Rudrapur is the upcoming local attraction which is located on the main Delhi–Nainital NH-87. It has 3 floors which has 3,00,000 ft^{2} of retail space and 400 ft frontage. The mall offers a Wave cinema 4-screen Cineplex, which will be the first Cineplex mall development in the region. This mall is a part of a 55-acre group housing development. which also proposes to have serviced apartments, multi-specialty hospitals as well as banquet halls.

== Demographics ==
Population growth
Year	Pop.	±%
1961	9,662	—
1971	25,173	+160.5%
1981	34,658	+37.7%
1991	61,280	+76.8%
2001	88,676	+44.7%
2011	140,857	+58.8%
Source: DCHB: Udham Singh Nagar

According to the 2011 census, the Rudrapur Urban Agglomeration (Rudrapur UA) has a population of 154,485, with the municipality contributing 140,884 of it. This makes Rudrapur the Second most populous city in Kumaon, and the Fifth most populous city in Uttarakhand. Males constitute 53% of the population and females 47% according to the 2011 census. Rudrapur has an average literacy rate of 71%: male literacy is 78%, and female literacy is 63%. In Rudrapur, 14% of the population is under 6 years of age. The Rudrapur Urban Agglomeration consists of area falling under Rudrapur Municipal Corporation, Rudrapur SIDCUL and 2 Out growths of Jagatpura and Rampura.

As of the 2001 India census, Rudrapur had a population of 88,720, which increased to 140,857 in 2011. The city has witnessed massive population growth most of the time. The population of the city increased around three times during the census years 1961–1971 and nearly doubled during 1981–1991. Rudrapur surpassed Jaspur in 1971 and Kashipur in 2011 to become the second most populous city in Kumaun. The high growth rate has been attributed to the migration of people from upper hills, and the development of SIDCUL Industrial Estate in recent years. About 80% population of Rudrapur lives on Illegally encroached Government land. In addition to that, 41.95% of total population of Rudrapur lives in Slums.

=== Religion ===
Religion in Rudrapur City (2011)
Religion	Percent
Hinduism	80.29%
Islam	15.76%
Sikhism	3.17%
Buddhism	0.03%
Christianity	0.43%
Others	0.32%

According to the 2011 Census of India, 80.29% people in Rudrapur were Hindus. 15.76% people followed Islam, making it the second most popular religion in city. Christianity was followed by 0.43%, Jainism by 0.12%, Sikhism by 3.17% and Buddhism by 3.17%. Around 0.03% stated 'Other Religion' while approximately 0.17% stated 'No Particular Religion'.

The city witnessed communal clashes on 2 October 2011 following an alleged act of sacrilege, prompting authorities to impose an indefinite curfew. Though unconfirmed reports said three persons were killed, an official statement later confirmed two deaths in the violence that spread to different parts of the town. In the ensuing clashes, nearly 5 shops and scores of vehicles were also torched.

=== Language ===
Languages spoken in Rudrapur city (2011)
1. Hindi (74.2%)
2. Bangla (13.1%)
3. Punjabi (4.36%)
4. Urdu (3.23%)
5. Kumaoni (2.60%)
6. Others (2.49%)

Hindi is spoken by 1,14,691, Bangla by 20,362, Punjabi by 6,740 people, Urdu by 4,999, and 4,018 people speak Kumaoni.

== Geography ==
Rudrapur is geographically located at latitude: 28.98⁰N and longitude: 79.40⁰E and is 830 feet above the sea level. The city is located 72 km away from Nainital, 259 km from the state capital Dehradun and 230 km from the national capital, Delhi. The Udham Singh Nagar district where the city is situated, lies within the seismic zone 4 in a scale of 2 to 5 (in order of increasing vulnerability to earthquakes) as per the (IS 1893 (Part 1), 2002).

=== Topology ===
The Rudrapur city is placed in the Terai belt of Uttarakhand state with the two rivers Kalyani and Begul flowing through it. This belt is extremely fertile for agriculture with alluvial soil types -Udifluventic Ustochrepts, Typic Ustipsamments, Udic Ustochrepts, Udic Haplusstolls, Typic Ustochreptscrops- which support crops like paddy, wheat, sugarcane, maize and other pulses grown in the region.

=== Climate ===
Rudrapur has a sub-tropical climate with an annual average temperature of 24.3 °C. The warmest month annually is June, where the average temperature is 40 °C. January is the coldest month with an average annual temperature of 14.9 °C. The average temperature variation which occurs between the warmest and coldest months is 16.7 °C. The city experiences an average annual rainfall of 1302mm per year with very high ground water levels ranging between 1m to 3 m. The average precipitation that the city experiences ranges between 38mm to 3mm monthly.

== Government and politics ==
=== Civic administration ===
The Rudrapur constituency is one of the 70 Vidhan Sabha Assembly Constituencies (AC) of the Uttarakhand state which has a total of 5 Parliamentary Constituencies (PC). Shiv Arora from BJP is the current sitting MLA from the Rudrapur constituency. The administrative district headquarter of Udham Singh Nagar District is located in Rudrapur.

=== City government ===
The Rudrapur city is governed by the civic body of Rudrapur Municipal Corporation which is called Nagar Nigam Rudrapur. It is one of the 11 Nagar Nigam in Uttarakhand. with an area of 27.65 km^{2}. In a process to expand its Municipal Councils, the Uttarakhand government upgraded the Rudrapur city administration from First Class Municipality to Municipal Corporation on 28 February 2013. The Rudrapur Municipal Corporation is divided into 20 wards which is governed by 20 elected municipal councilors and a Mayor of the city.

=== City politics ===
The main political parties active in Rudrapur city are Bhartiya Janta Party (BJP), Indian National Congress (INC), Bahujan Samaj Party (BSP), Uttarakhand Kranti Dal (UKD) among others. The current Mayor of the Rudrapur city is Vikas Sharma from BJP.

==== List of Mayors (Municipal Corporation of Rudrapur) ====
1. Soni Koli (Reserved Seat) 3 May 2013 - 3 May 2018 [Bharatiya Janata Party]
2. Rampal Singh (Reserved Seat) 2 December 2018 to 2 December 2023 [Bharatiya Janata Party]
3. Vikas Sharma (General Seat) 7 February 2025 to present [Bharatiya Janata Party]

== Civic utilities ==
=== Water supply ===
Most of the city depends on ground water for its daily water requirement, where only around 11% of the city has a coverage of water supply network supplying 49 liter per capita per day (lpcd) of water daily. According to a 2019 Sanitation Capacity building platform (SCBP) report, under AMRUT program, the city plans to increase the water supply coverage of the city to approximately 53% with 87 lpcd of daily water capacity whereas the AMRUT mission site boasts a target mission of 100% water supply coverage and 135 lpcd of water by the end of the mission for its respective target cities.

=== Sewerage and sanitation ===
As per the census 2011, the total percentage of households which had Individual Household Toilets (IHHT) was reported to be around 66.2% of the total number of households in the city. This number according to the AMRUT mission has now been increased to a 100% for the city of Rudrapur whereas the sewage network coverage in the city according to the 2011 census was 8.4% due to high ground water table and high expenses and technical challenges in laying the system. Most of this system according to the SCBP report is non-functioning and around 68.4% of the households are connected to open drains which lead to the river without any sewage treatment. This has led to over-pollution of the two rivers Kalyani and Begul present within the city.

== Transport ==
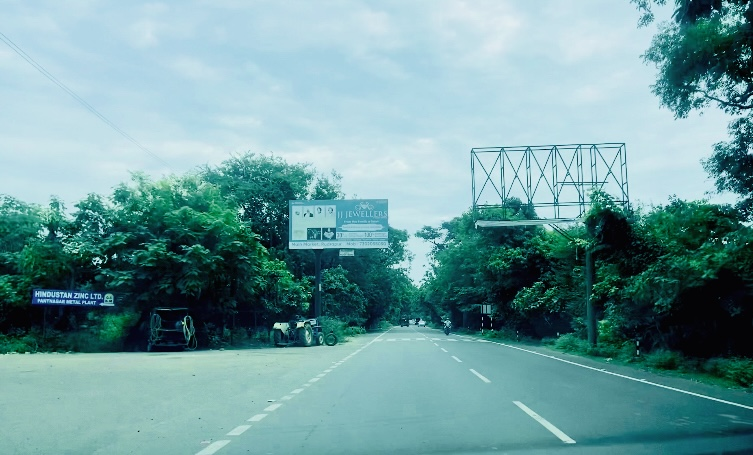
New Delhi- Karnaprayag NH 109 which connects Delhi to several Tourist Destinations in Kumaon Region.

The city is served by the Pantnagar Airport at Pantnagar 12.2 km (7.6 mi) from the city centre. The airport is operated by Airports Authority of India and caters to domestic flights to Delhi and Dehradun. It has a single runway, which is 4,500 ft (1,400 m) in length and is capable of handling a turboprop aircraft.

Train service in Rudrapur started in 1886, upon the construction of a branch line by Rohilkund and Kumaon Railway connecting Lalkuan on Bareilly–Kathgodam line with Rampur. Rudrapur lies on the Rampur–Lalkuan broad-gauge railway line and the city falls under the Izzatnagar railway division of North Eastern Railway zone of Indian Railways.

Three major National highways run through Rudrapur. National Highway 9, which runs from Malaut in Punjab to Pithoragarh in Uttarakhand passes through Rudrapur. This highway connects Rudrapur with several cities like Delhi, Rampur, Haridwar, Saharanpur, Dehradun, Nainital, Sitarganj, Khatima, Tanakpur and Pithoragarh. Other Highways starting from Rudrapur include National Highway 109 and National Highway 309. Rudrapur Bus Station serves as the central bus stand for Uttarakhand Transport Buses plying on InterState Routes from the city. The station was built before the 1960s and is spread over approximately 4 acres.

== Economy ==
Rudrapur has established itself as a significant trading center within the Udham Singh Nagar district, which itself is a big trading center in the region. The district exports include industrial as well as agricultural products, both of which are predominantly channeled from Rudrapur. The Basmati rice from Rudrapur is among the top crop which is produced in the region. Post the setup of State Infrastructure and Industrial Development Corporation of Uttarakhand Limited (SIDCUL), enhanced by the broad-gauge railway network in the area, Rudrapur has developed into an industrial city with its city limits expanding to accommodate new residential demands of the workers and professionals moving into the area.

=== Industry ===
The development of industries is attributed largely to the setting up of a large Integrated Industrial Estate under State Infrastructure and Industrial Development Corporation of Uttarakhand Limited (SIDCUL). This has propelled the town into the forefront of industrial activity and has attracted companies like:

- LSC Infratech Ltd.
- Delta Power solutions
- Tata Motors
- Kumar Autowheels Pvt. Ltd.
- Roquette Riddhi Siddhi Pvt. Ltd.
- Time Technoplast Limited
- Nestlé India
- Bajaj Auto
- Surya Polypet Pvt. Ltd.
- Fab Four Technoplast
- Dabur India Limited
- TVS Motors
- Unimax International
- Unimax Scaffoldings
- Britannia Industries
- Mahindra Tractor
- Micromax
- Forme mobile
- Greenpanel Industries Limited
- Parle Agro
- HCL
- HP
- Hindustan Zinc Limited
- Ashok Leyland
- Ganesha Polytex
- GuruTie.com
- Imagine Softech – Web Development Company
- Biochem Laboratories - (water treatment chemicals, plants & spares company), etc.

The city has been transformed into a major industrial hub with many automobile and agro based industries.

== See also ==
- 1991 Rudrapur bombings
- List of cities in Uttarakhand and Himachal Pradesh
