= 1991 Rudrapur bombings =

Terror attack in Uttarakhand, India

- Location: Rudrapur, India
- Date: 17 October 1991
- Attack type: Dual bombings
- Deaths: 40
- Injuries: 140
- Victim: Hindu civilians
- Perpetrators: Khalistan National Army (claimed); Bhindranwale Saffron Tigers of Khalistan (confirmed)

1991 Rudrapur bombings were bombings by Khalistani terrorists in 1991 in Rudrapur city in Indian state of Uttarakhand.

== Explosion ==
Two bombs were exploded on 17 October 1991. The first bomb exploded when people were watching Ramlila in the public ground. After 15 minutes the second bomb went off near the hospital where injured were being taken. The bombings killed more than 40 people and injuring 140 people. Later Bhindranwale Saffron Tigers of Khalistan (BSTK) and the Khalistan National Army (KNA) claimed the responsibility for the bombings. The police however only accused BSTK.

== Improvised Explosive Device (IED) ==
It was one of the most significant incidents of the region to employ an IED for the explosion.
