= Bandia =

Census town in Udham Singh Nagar, Uttarakhand, India

- Census town
- Location in Uttarakhand, India Bandia (India)
- Coordinates: 28.92°N 79.54°E
- Country: India
- State: Uttarakhand
- District: Udham Singh Nagar

Population (2001)
  - Total: 8,897

Languages
  - Official: Hindi
  - Native: Kauravi, Tharu
- Time zone: UTC+5:30 (IST)
- Vehicle registration: UK
- Website: uk.gov.in

Bandia is a census town in Udham Singh Nagar district in the state of Uttarakhand, India.

== Geography ==
Bandia is located at 28.92°N 79.54°E.

== Demographics ==
As of 2001 India census, Bandia had a population of 8897. Males constitute 56% of the population and females 44%. Bandia has an average literacy rate of 55%, lower than the national average of 59.5%; with 64% of the males and 36% of females literate. 13% of the population is under 6 years of age.
