= Shoorsen Nagar =

- Location within Uttarakhand
- Coordinates: 29.875°N 77.858°E
- Founder: Khushi Saini

Government
  - Body: Roorkee Municipal Corporation

Population (2011)
  - Total: 10,340

Language
  - Official: Hindi
  - Native: Khariboli

Shoorsen Nagar, formerly known as Salempur Rajputana is a census town in the Roorkee Municipal Corporation of Roorkee in Haridwar district of the Indian state of Uttarakhand. It is an area in Roorkee, Ramnagar. Shoorsen Nagar is famous for its ameliorative, productive and progressive industrial area. This is a town with Hindu majority most people here are of Kuhada, Daharia, Rada and Gadadiya (Jambuwal) gotra and are part of Saini community. A minority of Muslims and Kashyaps and other Scheduled castes also exist in the village.

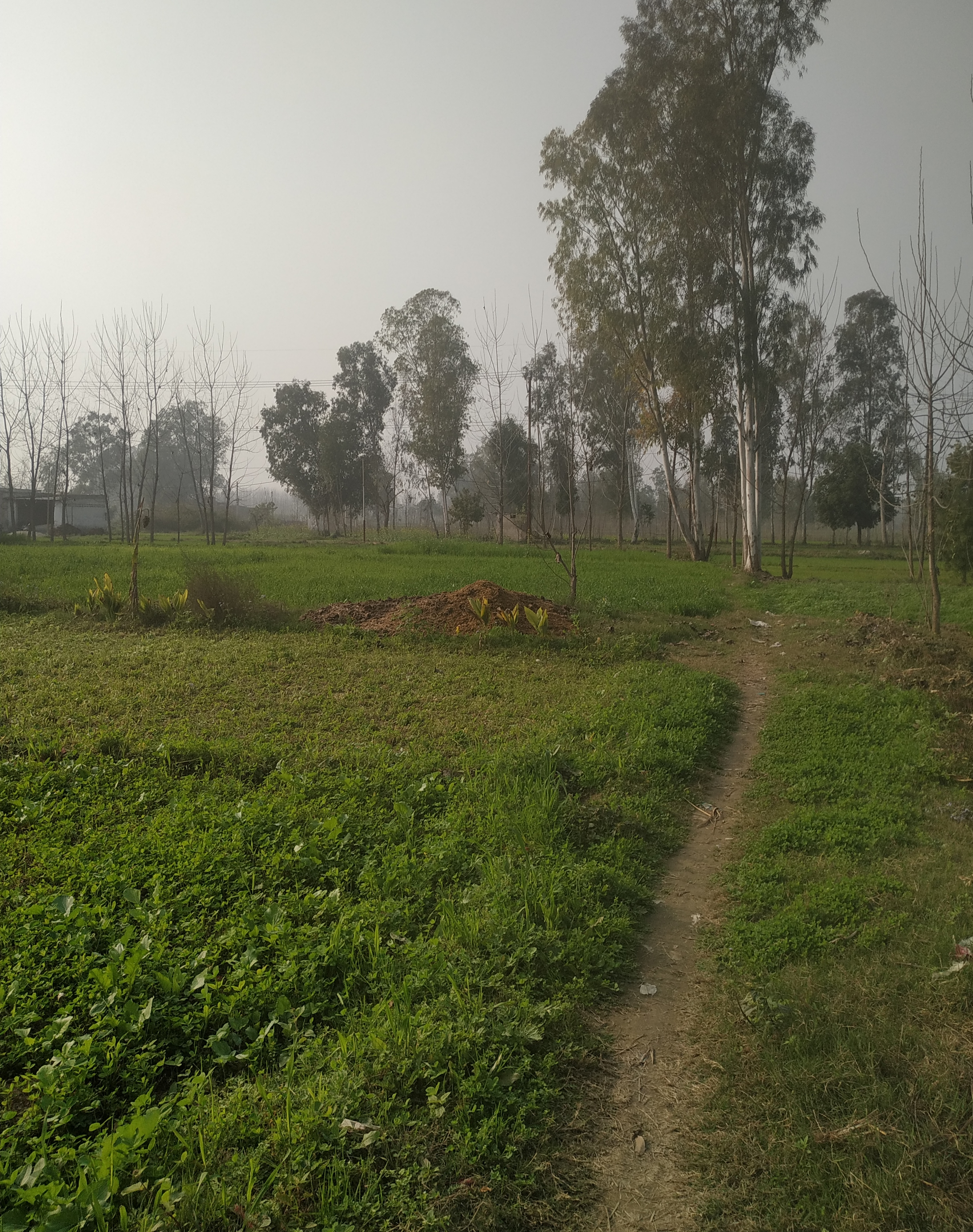
Greenery of Shoorsen Nagar

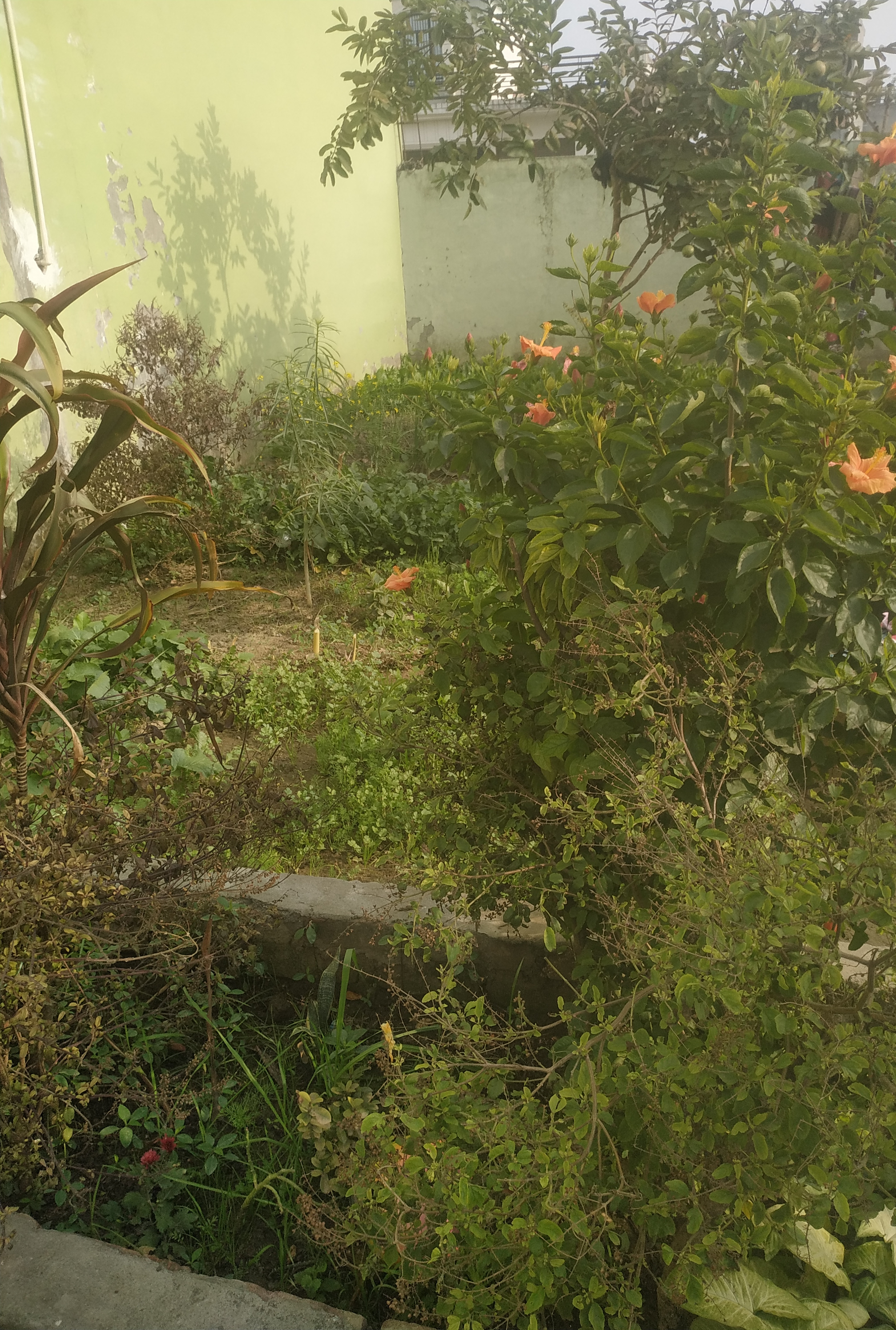
Beauty of Shoorsen Nagar

== History ==
=== Ancient history ===
Shoorsen Nagar was a city that was a part of Mayapuri (Present, Haridwar) that was kingdom of Daksh, who was son of lord brahma. Ancient name of Shoorsen Nagar was Varadnagri which means a city which provides boons or fulfills wishes of its citizens and visitors. Varad is also a name of Lord Shiva and Lord Ganesha. Varadnagri was slowly and gradually renamed to Shyampur. Sati (Parvati) was daughter of Daksh, who was married to Lord Shiva in this context Varadnagri was also in laws house of Lord Shiva. At some distance from Varadnagri Sati kund can be seen were Sati laid down her life. Goddess Sati came for excursion in the gardens of Varadnagri.

=== Medieval history ===
==== Hindu period ====
Shyampur (presently, Salempur) was renamed to Shyampur Rajputana by Rajput rulers. Development was carried out in this area and also a temple of Lord Shiva was constructed, which is in present time known as Pracheen Shiv Mandir, however in year 2020 this temple has been reconstructed. (Note: They put Rajputana at the end of Shyampur because they were Rajput.)

==== Mughal period ====
Shyampur Rajputana was renamed this place to Salempur by mughal emperors. (Note: mughals were very cruel.)

=== Modern history ===
==== Before independence ====
Shoorsen Nagar was village (Salempur Rajputana) of Saharanpur district before Haridwar district came into existence on 28 December 1988. Shoorsen Nagar was resettled by Khushi Saini in year 1891. (Note: This is a local information.) Sons of Khushi Saini were Faqira Saini and Amar Singh, who were farmers. Then Faqira had two sons Janki Saini and Ruhla Saini, who were also known as Neem wala. (Note: Because they had a tree of Neem)

==== After independence ====
First elections were carried out in year 1992 after 73rd amendment in Constitution. Until 2016 Shoorsen Nagar was a village (named Salempur Rajputana) near Roorkee city but in 2016 Shoorsen Nagar became a town and a part of the Roorkee Municipal Corporation and Jhabrera Municipal council.

On 31 March 2025, Salempur Rajputana was renamed to Shoorsen Nagar.

== Facilities ==
=== Shrines ===
==== Pracheen Shiv Mandir ====
An ancient temple of Lord shiva was constructed here by Hindu rulers. This is presently known as Pracheen Shiv Mandir. From year 2020 to 2021 this temple was reconstructed. The reconstruction was done possible by the assistance and support of people of Shoorsen Nagar. The inauguration and the installation of idols of Lord Shiva, Goddess Parvati, Lord Ganesh, Lord Karthikeya Shiv ling, and Nandi was done on 18 February 2021.

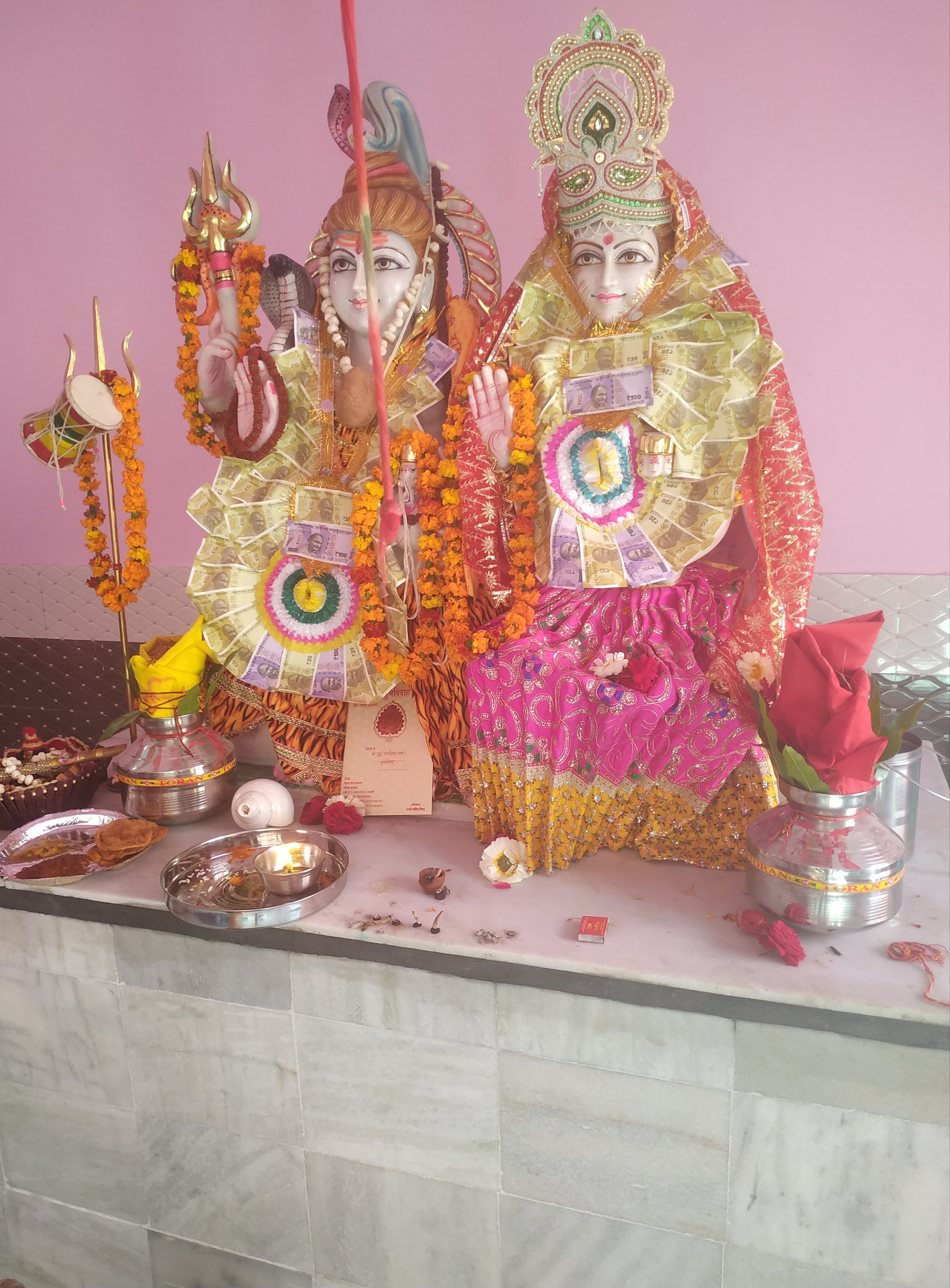

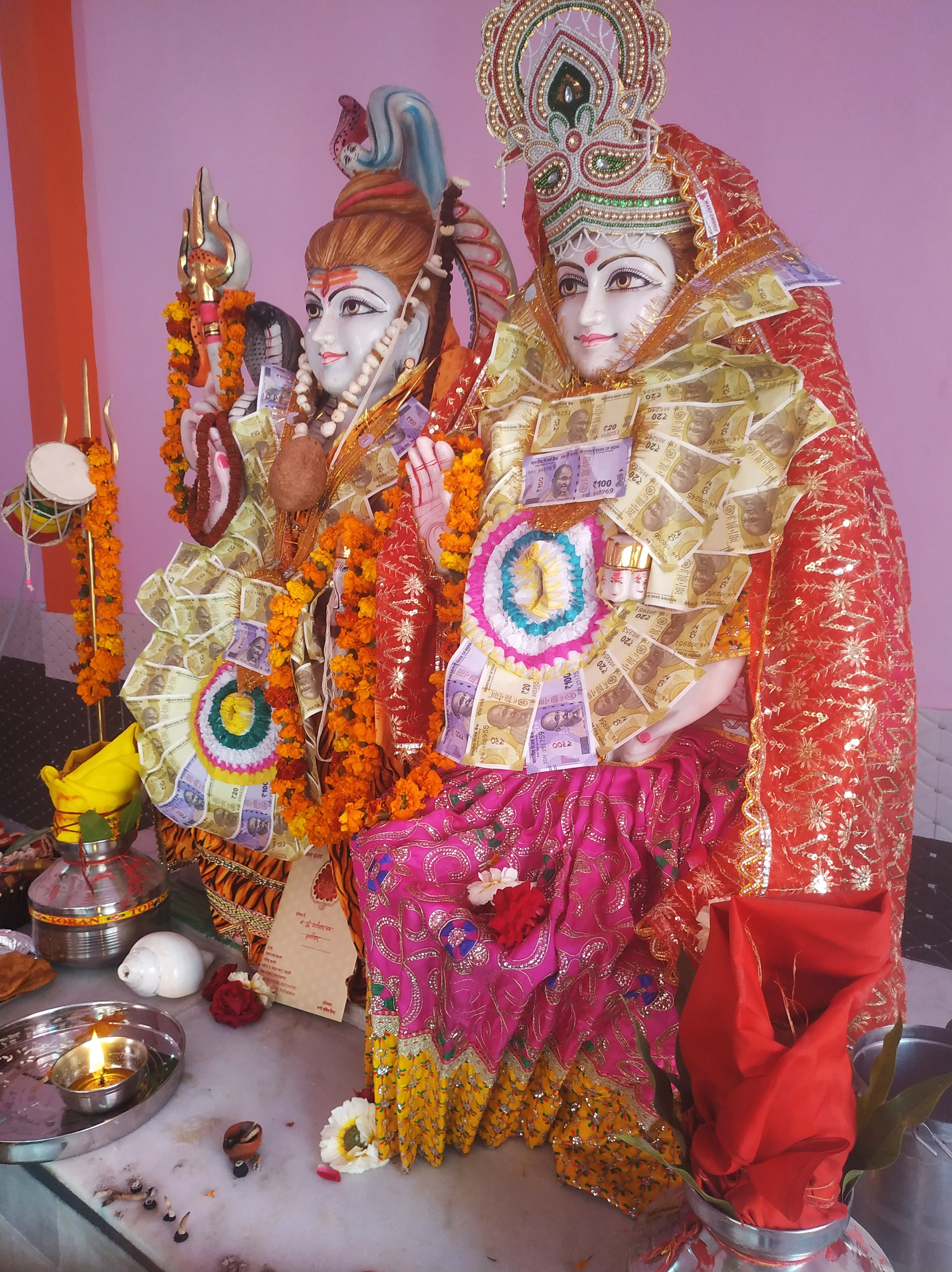
Idol of Lord Shiv, goddess Parvati, Lord Ganesh and Lord Kartikeya

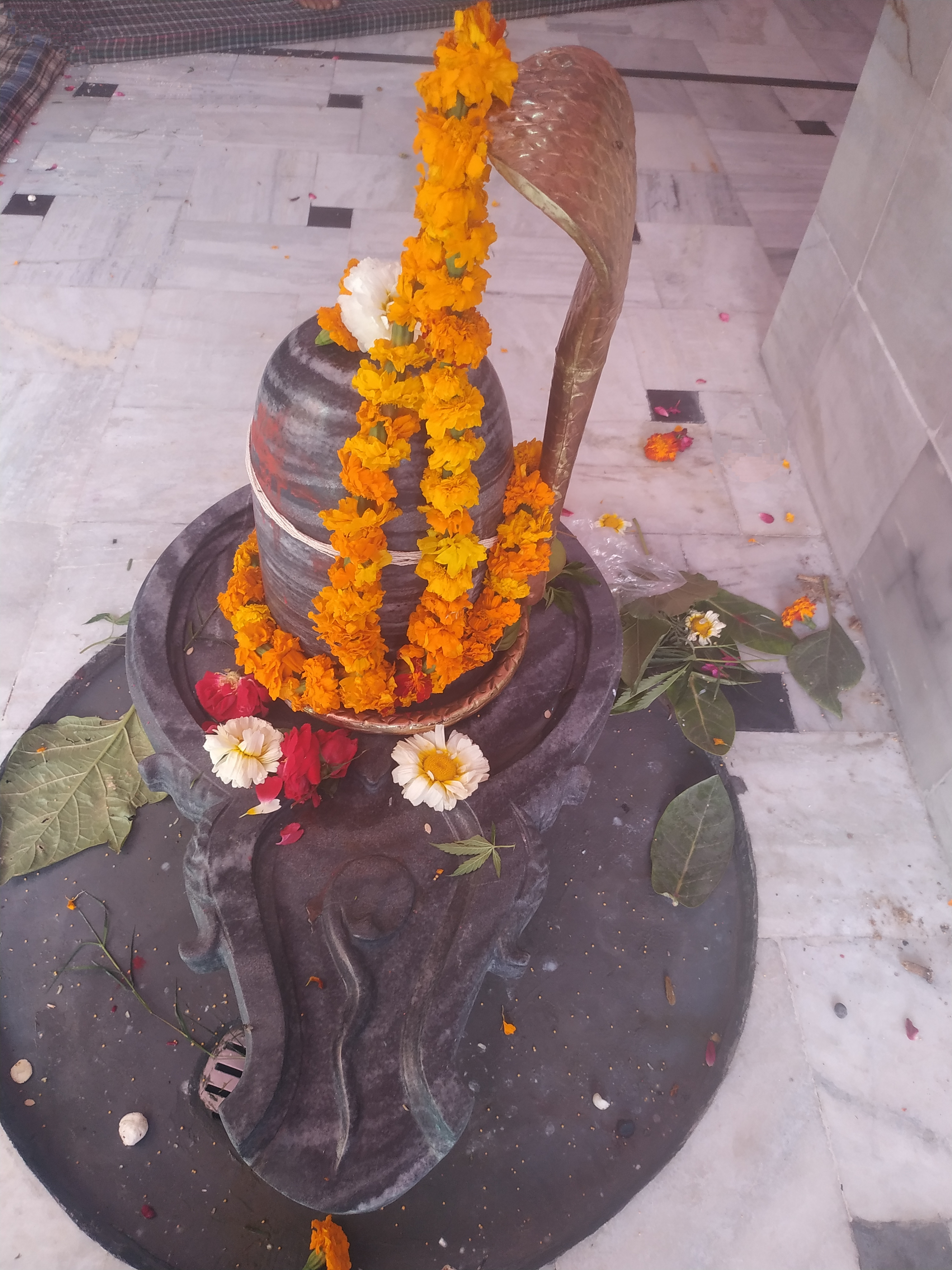
Shiv ling

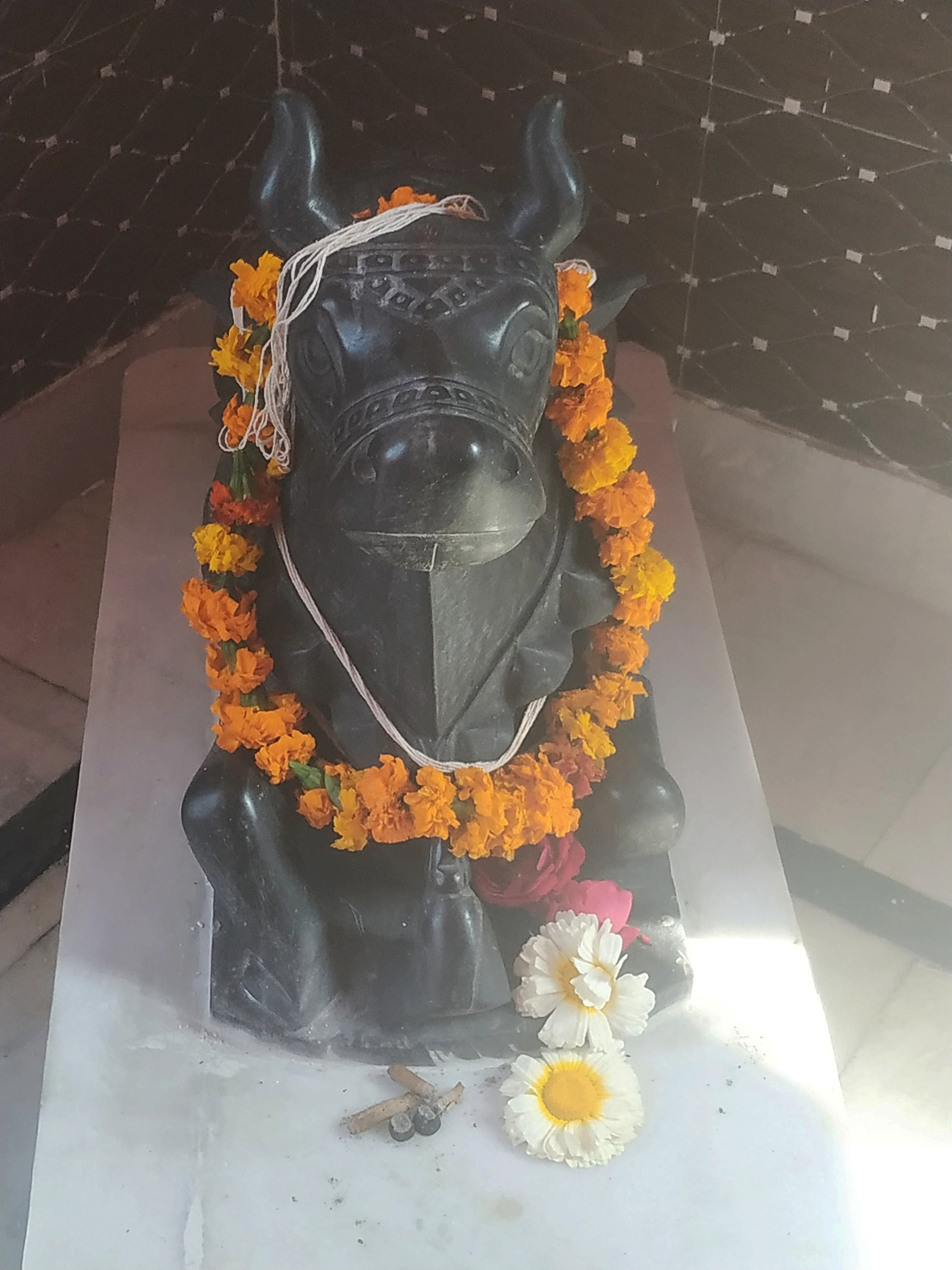
Idol of Nandi bull

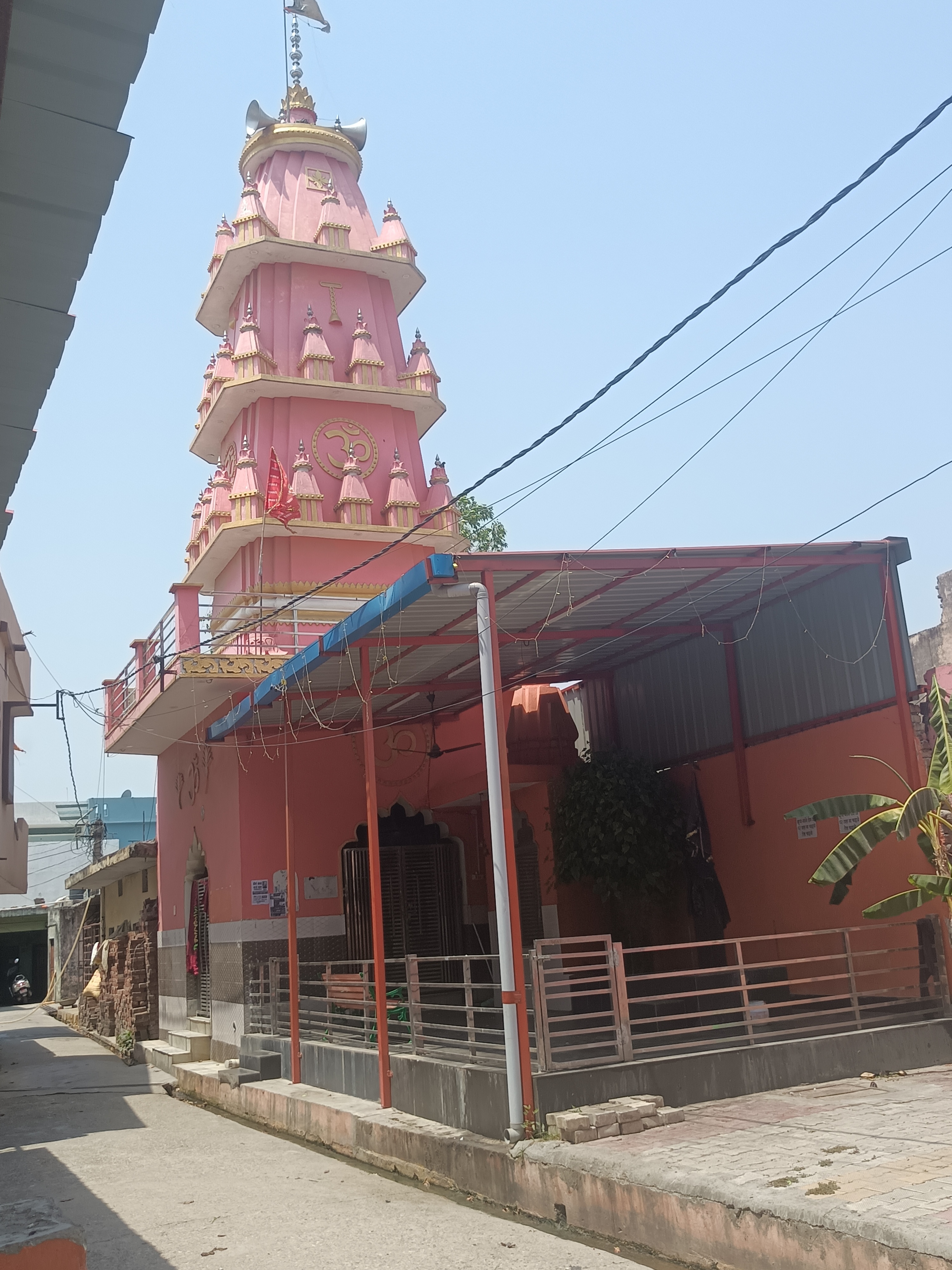
Pracheen Shiv Mandir in Salempur Rajputana

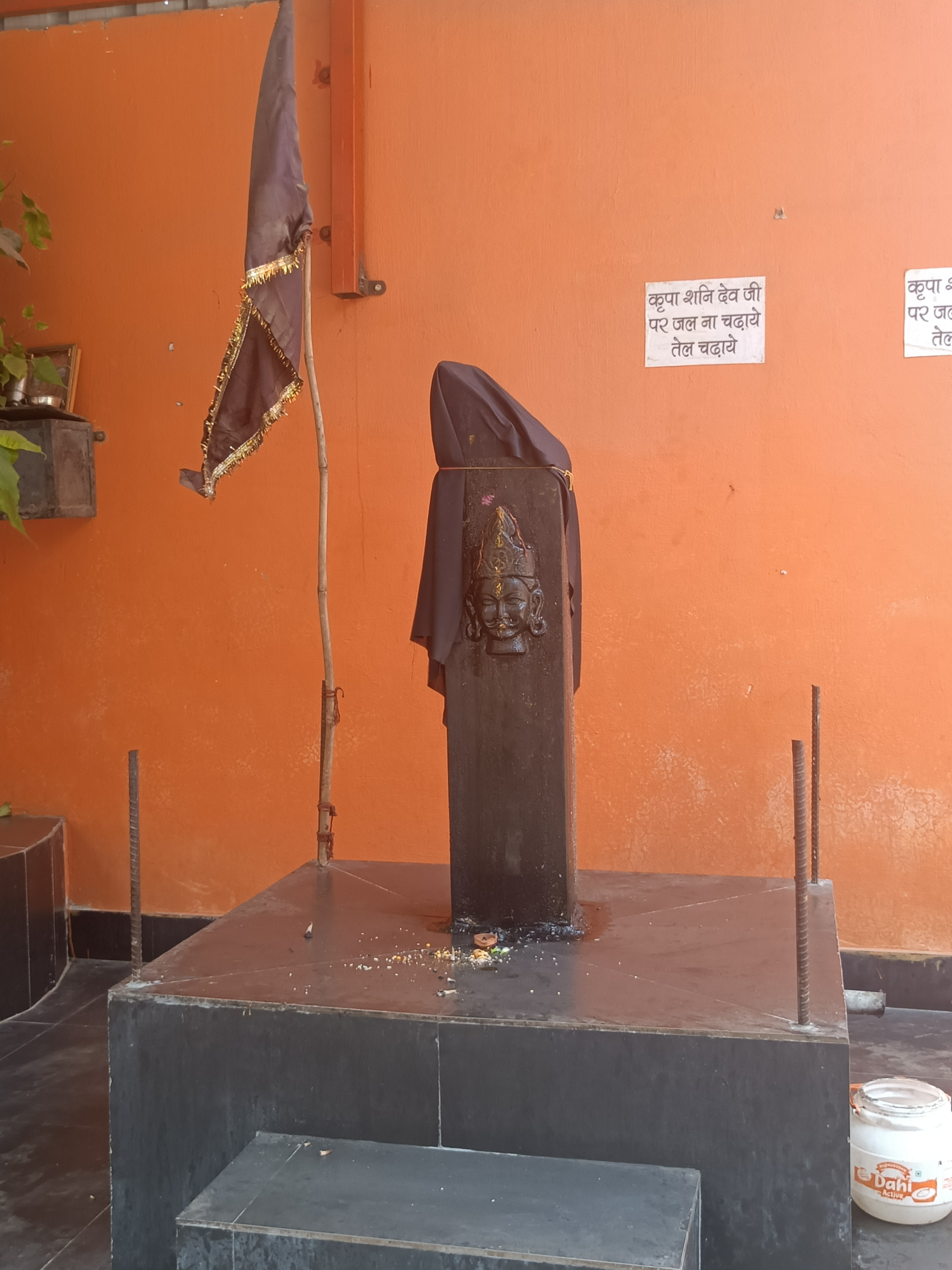
Shanidev at Pracheen Shiv Mandir

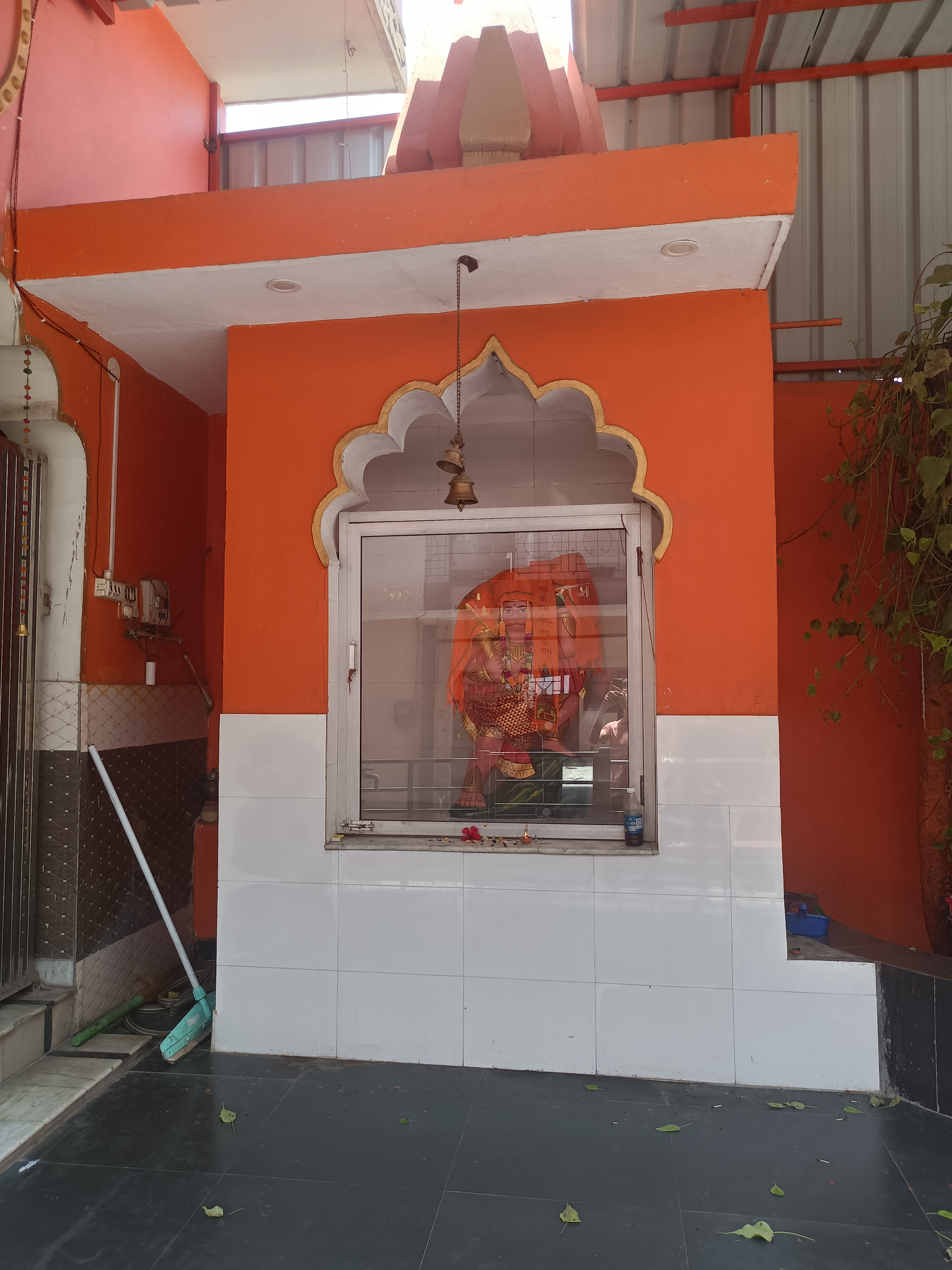
HanumanTemple in Salmepur Rajputana

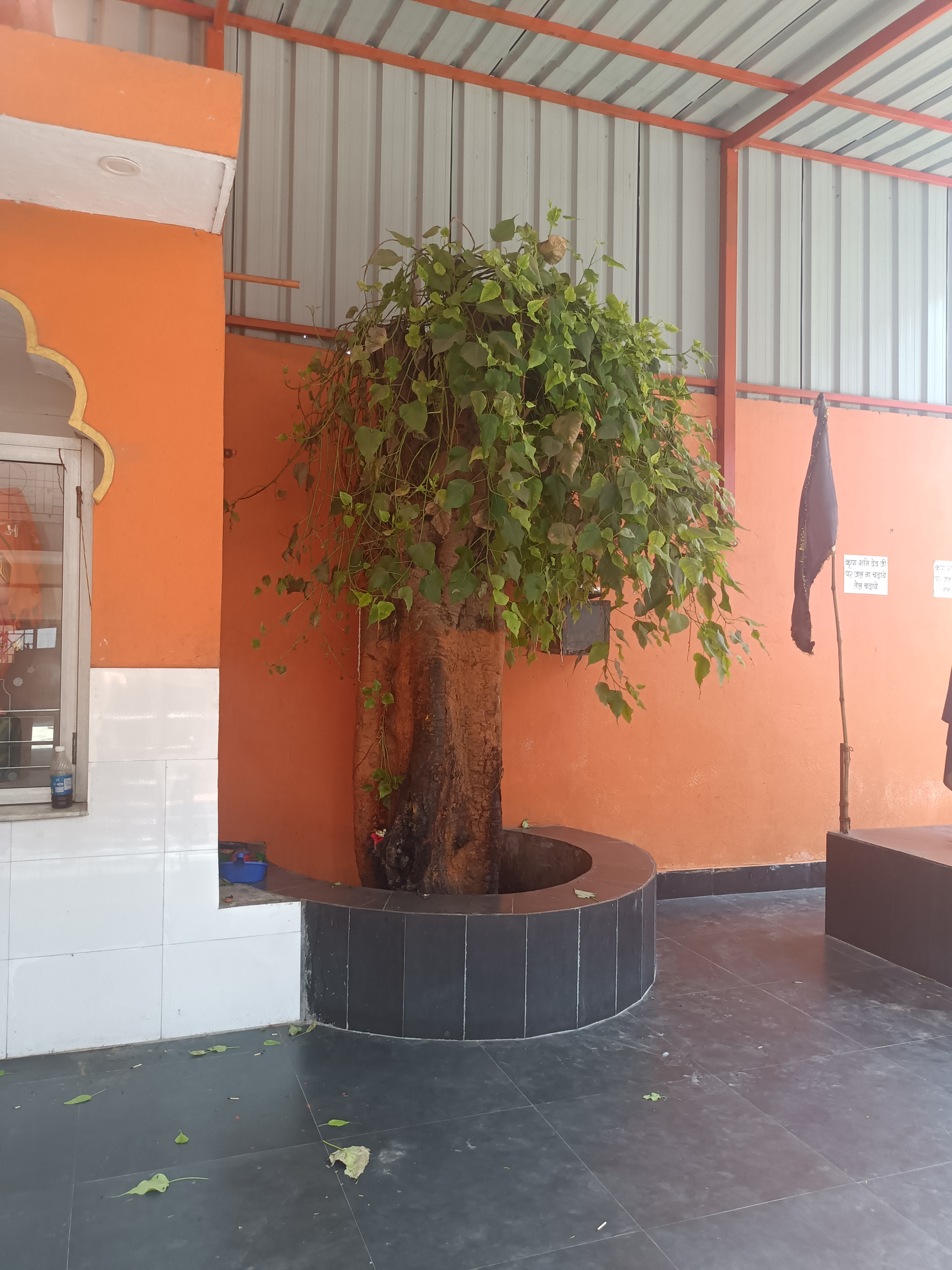
Shiv Vriksha at Pracheen Shiv Mandir

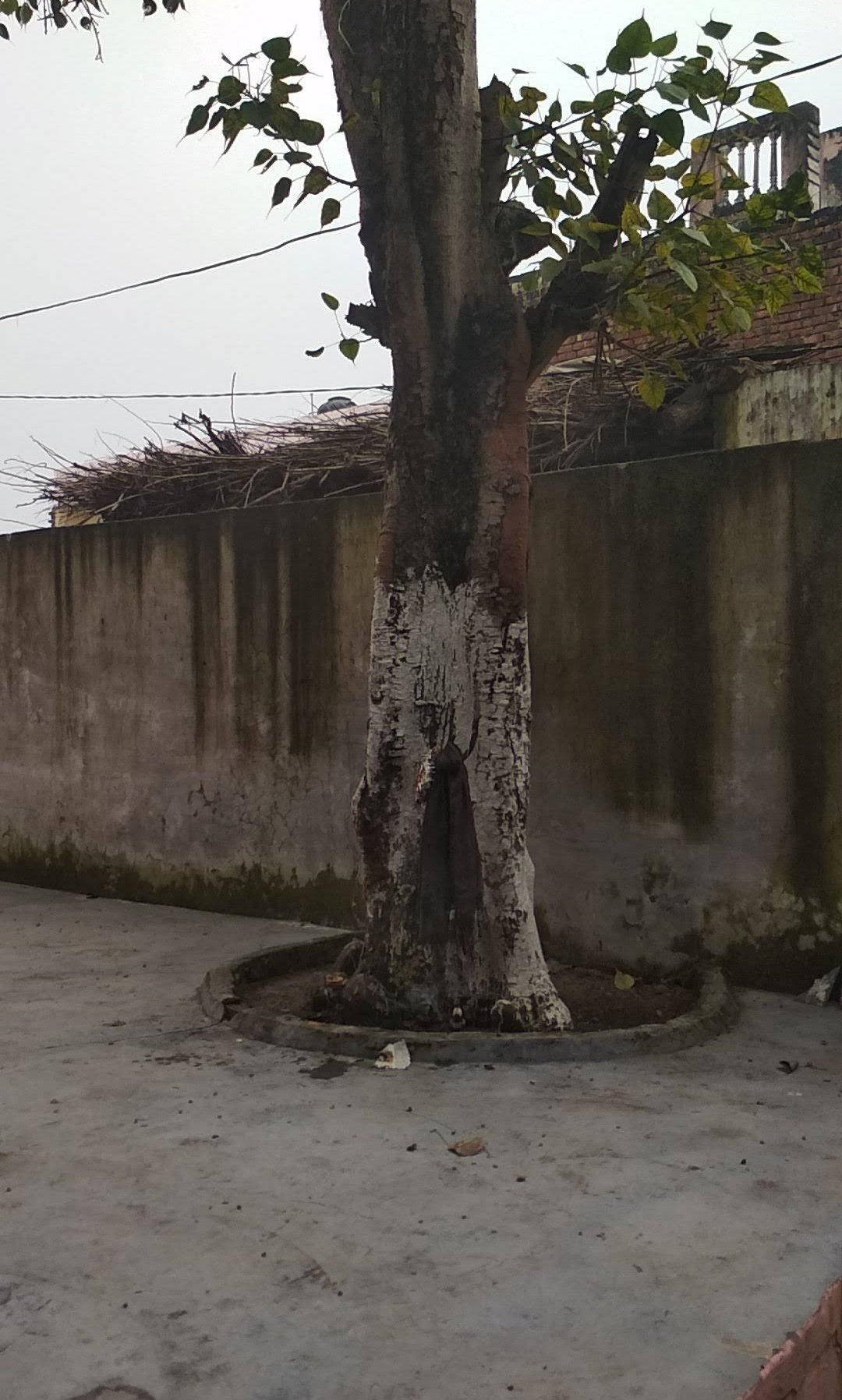
Shivvriksha (A Pipal tree near prachin Shiv mandir) in old construction

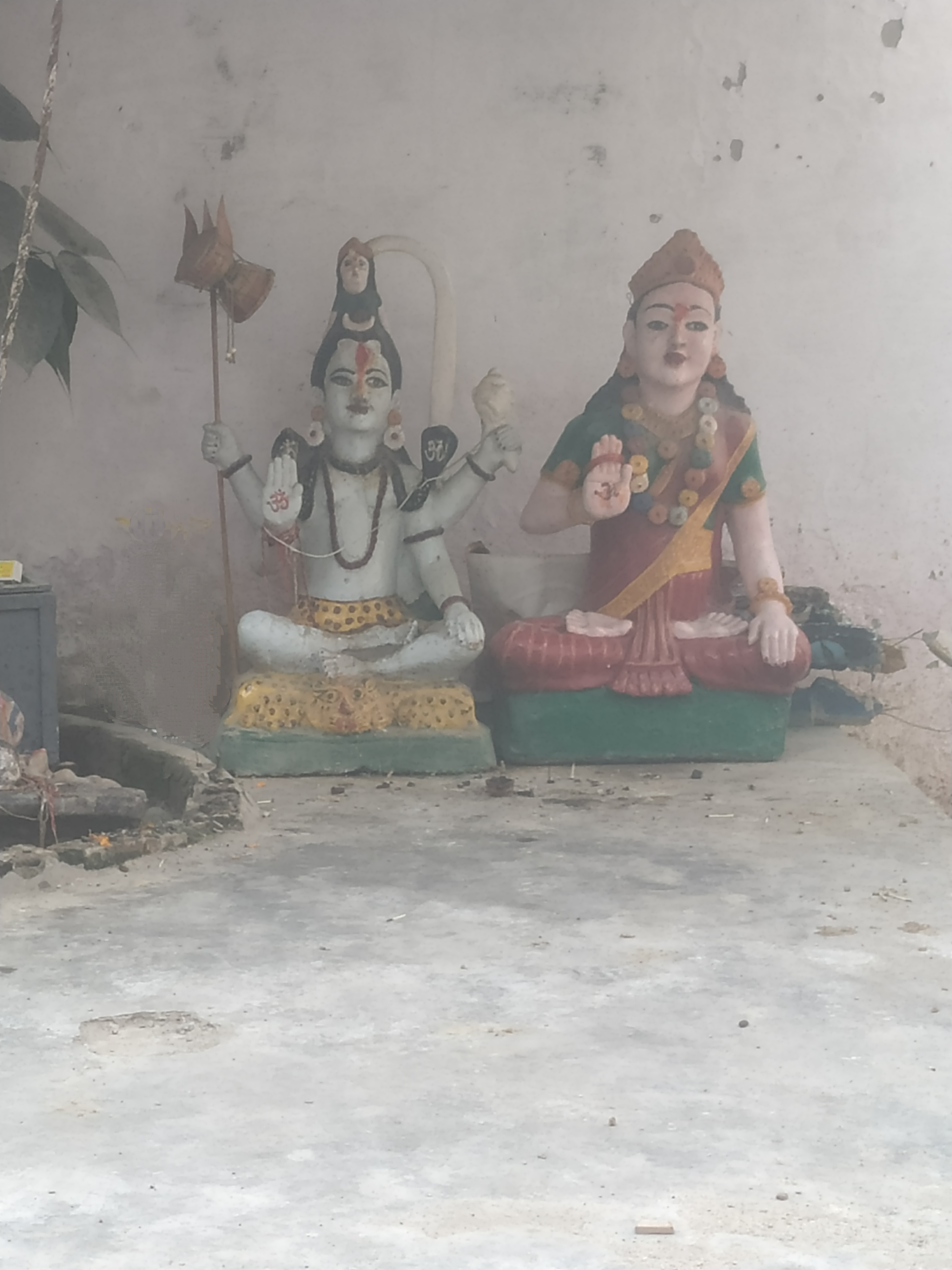
Old idols of Lord Shiva and goddess Parvati.

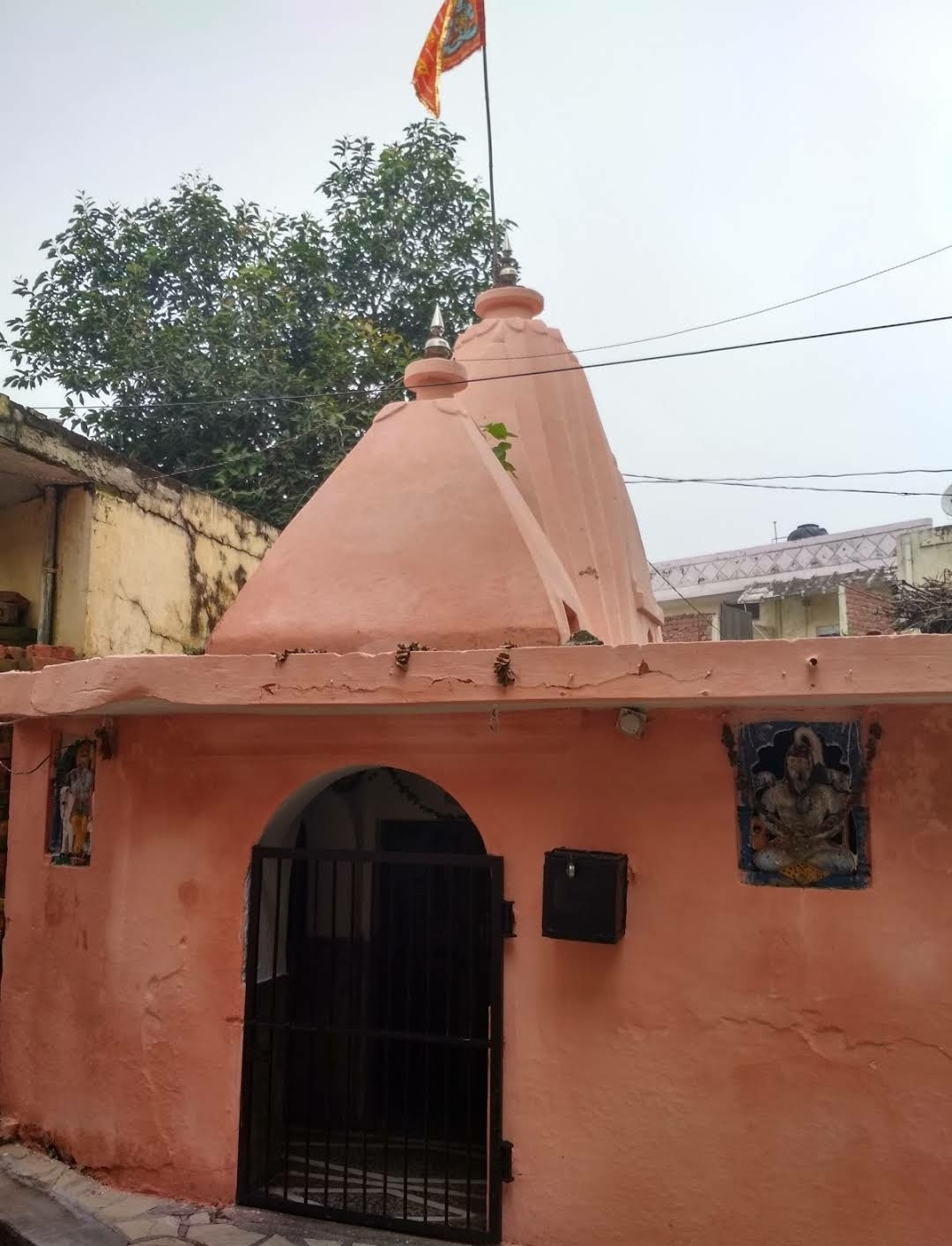
Old Prachin Shiv Mandir

==== Bhumiya Kheda ====
Bhumiya Dev, Regionally called 'Deta' (an Apabhraṃśa of 'devta'), is a Deity of Shoorsen Nagar. Bhumiya kheda is the temple of Lord Bhumiya. In addition to people of this village, people of Premnagar, Krishnanagar, and other areas near Shoorsen Nagar also worship Lord Bhumiya as a God and savior.

== Demography ==
=== Population ===
According to the 2011 census, the total population of Shoorsen Nagar was 10340 from which 4827 were female and 5513 are male. There were 1310 children under age of 6 out of which 707 were male and 603 were female.

Literacy rate and population of Shoorsen Nagar
| S. no | Religion | % of total literacy rate | Male population | Female population | Total population | % of total population |
| 1. | Hindu | 97.23% | 5368 | 4675 | 10043 | 97.14% |
| 2. | Muslims | 1.16% | 107 | 111 | 218 | 2.1% |
| 3. | Christian | 0.06% | 2 | 4 | 6 | 0.06% |
| 4. | Sikh | 0.12% | 34 | 35 | 69 | 0.67% |
| 5. | Jain | 0.85% | 2 | 1 | 3 | 0.03% |

=== Religions ===
Of total population, 97.14 are Hindus, 2.1% are Muslims, and 0.77% are of other religions.

=== Literacy ===
Total literacy rate of Shoorsen Nagar is 90.29%, here 83.93% of females, and 95.88% of males are educated.
