= Mohanpur, Ludhiana =

Mohanpur
- Village
- Location in Punjab, India Mohanpur (India)
- Coordinates: 30.729°N 76.148°E
- Country: India
- State: Punjab
- District: Ludhiana
- Elevation: 230 m (750 ft)

Population (2009)
  - Total: 1,574

Languages
  - Official: Punjabi
- Time zone: UTC+5:30 (IST)
- PIN: 141401
- Website: www.mohanpur.in

Mohanpur is a village in Khanna Tehsil of Ludhiana district, located in the northern Indian state of Punjab. It is known for its historical roots, cultural diversity, and proximity to major urban centers.

== History ==
Mohanpur was established in the 18th century by Bhai Guddar Ji. The village is home to many families with the surname Bhandal. While the majority of residents follow Sikhism, the village also includes Hindu, Muslim, and Christian communities, reflecting its inclusive social fabric.

== Geography ==
Mohanpur is situated:

- 38 km east of the district headquarters, Ludhiana
- 8 km from Khanna
- 68 km from the state capital, Chandigarh

== Transport ==
By road: The village is located near National Highway 1 (Delhi–Ludhiana), offering strong road connectivity. Regular private buses and tempo services operate between Khanna and nearby villages. Minivan taxis are also available for personal travel.

By rail: Nearby railway stations include Khanna and Chawapall. The major rail hub, Ludhiana Junction, is approximately 40 km away.

By air: The nearest airports are:

- Chandigarh Domestic Airport
- Sri Guru Ram Dass Jee International Airport, Amritsar
- Indira Gandhi International Airport, Delhi (for international travel)

== Demographics ==
- Population (2011): 1,563
- Households: 328
- Sex Ratio: 937 females per 1,000 males (above state average)
- Village Code: 033204
- Area: 289 hectares
- Governing Body: Gram Panchayat, Mohanpur

== Education ==
Schools in Mohanpur:

- Green Grove Public School (CBSE-affiliated)
- Government Primary School
- Khalsa Model School (Private)

Nearby Colleges:

- Mata Ganga Khalsa College for Women, Manji Sahib
- Gulzar Group of Institutes
- Sanjeevani Group of Institutes
- Kular College of Nursing
- A.S. College, Khanna

== Culture ==
Mohanpur celebrates major Punjabi festivals such as Vaisakhi, Gurpurab, and Diwali with enthusiasm. The village has several Gurdwaras, temples, and community centers that foster unity and cultural pride.
