= Uttarakhand Board of School Education =

Agency of Government of Uttarakhand

- उत्तराखण्ड विद्यालयी शिक्षा परिषद्
- Abbreviation: UBSE
- Formation: 22 September 2001; 24 years ago
- Type: Governmental Board of School Education
- Headquarters: Ramnagar
- Location: Uttarakhand, India
- Official language: Hindi
- Chairman: Mukul Kumar Sati
- Parent organisation: Department of School Education, Uttarakhand, Government of Uttarakhand
- Website: Official website . Result Portal

Uttarakhand Board of School Education (Hindi: उत्तराखण्ड विद्यालयी शिक्षा परिषद्) abbr. UBSE is an agency of Government of Uttarakhand entrusted with the responsibilities of prescribing courses of instructions and text books and conducting examinations for secondary school students in Uttarakhand. It is also responsible for result declaration of Board examination. It was set up in 2001 and has its headquarters in Ramnagar. At present more than 10,000 schools are affiliated with the Board. The Board sets up over 1,300 examination centres for over 300,000 examinees every year.

== Timeline ==
- 9 February 1996: Regional office of the Uttar Pradesh Madhyamik Shiksha Parishad was established at Ramnagar, Uttarakhand.
- 1999: For the first time exams were conducted under the regional office at Ramnagar for Garhwal division and Kumaon division.
- 22 September 1996: Uttaranchal Shiksha Evam Pariksha Parishad was established followed by the foundation of new state Uttaranchal from erstwhile Uttar Pradesh.
- 2002: For the first time exams were conducted under Uttaranchal Shiksha Evam Pariksha Parishad.
- 22 April 2006: Uttaranchal Board of School Education was created by Uttaranchal School Education Act, 2006 enacted by the Uttaranchal Legislative Assembly.
- 11 December 2008: The institution was renamed Uttarakhand Board of School Education.

== See also ==
- Education in Uttarakhand
- List of institutions of higher education in Uttarakhand
