= Mohanpur Mohammadpur =

Mohanpur
- Southern suburb of Roorkee city
- Location in Uttarakhand, India Mohanpur (India)
- Coordinates: 29.78°N 77.97°E
- Country: India
- State: Uttarakhand
- District: Haridwar
- Elevation: 240 m (790 ft)

Population (2011)
  - Total: 9,300

Languages
  - Official: Hindi
- Time zone: UTC+5:30 (IST)
- Vehicle registration: UK
- Website: uk.gov.in

Mohanpur is a census town in Haridwar district in the Indian state of Uttarakhand.

== Geography ==
Mohanpur is located at 29.78°N 77.97°E. It has an average elevation of 240 metres (787 feet). It consists of two villages one is Mohammadpur inhabitant of Muslim Gada community, other is Mohanpura inhabitant of Hindu Gadariya (Pal) community.

== Demographics ==
As of 2001 India census, Mohanpur had a population of 9300. Males constitute 52% of the population and females 48%. Mohanpur has an average literacy rate of 71%, higher than the national average of 59.5%: male literacy is 75%, and female literacy is 59%. In Mohanpur, 14% of the population is under 6 years of age.
