= Dhangarhi =

Road bridge in Uttarakhand, India

Dhangarhi Bridge धनगढ़ी सेतु
- Carries: National Highway 309 (NH-309)
- Crosses: Dhangarhi (Dhangadhi) drain
- Locale: Ramnagar, Nainital district, Uttarakhand, India

Characteristics
- Design: prestressed concrete box girder
- Total length: 220.9 metres (725 ft)

History
- Opened: 5 July 2026

Dhangarhi, sometimes spelled Dhangadhi Bridge, is a girder bridge carrying National Highway 309 over the Dhangarhi drain near Ramnagar in the Nainital district of Uttarakhand, India. It sits close to kilometre stone 46 on the Ramnagar–Bubakhal stretch of the highway, a road that links the Kumaon and Garhwal regions.

== History ==
Before the bridge existed, vehicles crossed the drain on a low causeway that flooded and washed out almost every monsoon, cutting off traffic between Kumaon and Garhwal for stretches at a time and disrupting the route also used by pilgrims heading to the Char Dham shrines. People in the area had been asking for a proper bridge here for a long time.

The Union Ministry of Road Transport and Highways cleared the project in November 2023 after the Uttarakhand government, under Chief Minister Pushkar Singh Dhami, pushed for it. It went into the ministry's 2023–24 annual plan and was built as a prestressed concrete box girder bridge, 220.9 metres long, at a cost of around ₹29.65 crore.

Dhami inaugurated the finished bridge on 5 July 2026, tying it into a broader talking point about road and infrastructure growth in the state's remoter areas over the past decade or so. He spent the same day in the area laying foundation stones for flood-protection work in Champawat district and looking in on development near the Garjiya Devi Temple in Ramnagar.

The bridge is meant mainly to keep NH-309 passable through the rains, since the old crossing point had a history of closing exactly when it was needed most. Ramnagar itself, just down the road, is better known as a gateway to Corbett National Park.

== See also ==
- National Highway 309 (India)
- Ramnagar, Uttarakhand
- Khairna
