= Simalkha =

Village and gram panchayat in Uttarakhand, India

Simalkha Simalkhan
- Village
- Location in Uttarakhand, India Simalkha (India)
- Coordinates: 29°30′50″N 79°25′21″E
- Country: India
- State: Uttarakhand
- Division: Kumaon
- District: Nainital subdivision_type4 = Tehsil
- Development block: Betalghat

Area
  - Total: 0.4818 km^{2} (0.1860 sq mi)

Population (2011)
  - Total: 697
  - Density: 1,450/km^{2} (3,750/sq mi)

Languages
  - Official: Hindi
- Time zone: UTC+5:30 (IST)
- PIN: 263135
- Vehicle registration: UK-04
- Census village code: 054480

Simalkha, recorded as Simalkhan in the 2011 Census of India, is a village and gram panchayat in the Kosya Kutauli tehsil and Betalghat development block of Nainital district, Uttarakhand, India. The Census village had a population of 697 people living in 162 households in 2011.

== Geography ==
Simalkhan has a recorded geographical area of 48.18 hectares. It lies in the hill region of the Kumaon division of Uttarakhand.

It is approximately 23.9 km from its district main city, Nainital, while Bhowali the nearest town, approximately 30 kilometres from the village. Simalkha is situated on a link road 16 km away from NH-87. Simalkha lies of Khairna–Ratighat–Betalghat road network, enroute Dhaniakote, Bargal and Betalghat.

== Demographics ==
According to the 2011 Census of India, Simalkhan had a population of 697, consisting of 325 males and 372 females. There were 94 children below the age of seven. The village had 162 households. A total of 468 residents were recorded as literate. The Scheduled Caste population was 146, while no residents were recorded as belonging to a Scheduled Tribe.

== Education ==
The village has a government inter college serving Simalkha and surrounding rural areas. In December 2021, the Uttarakhand government issued an order renaming Government Inter College Simalkha in honour of Chandan Singh Bhandari, a soldier from Betalghat block who was killed during the Kargil War.

== See also ==
- Betalghat
- Nainital district
- Kumaon division
