= Kosi River (Uttarakhand) =

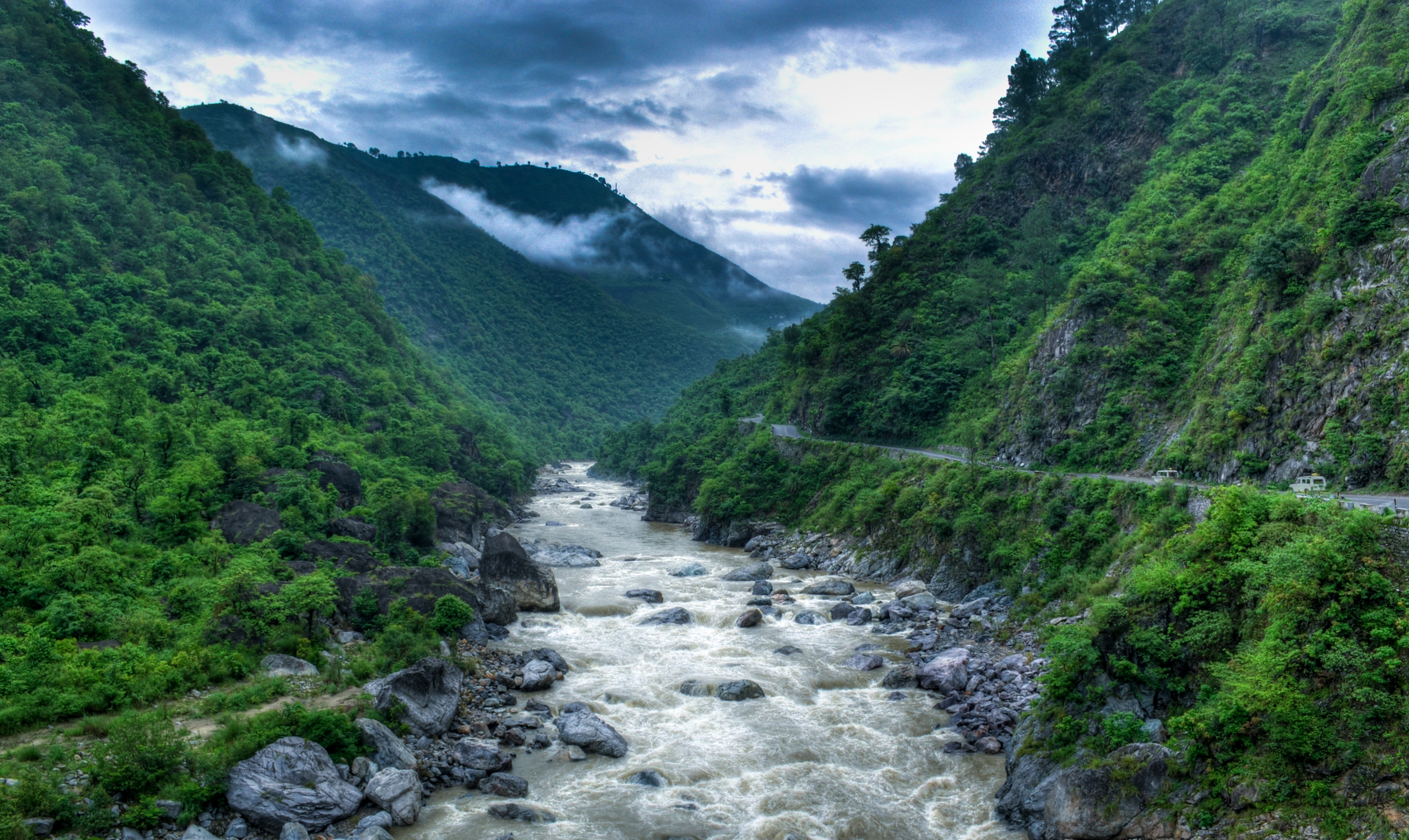
- Kosi River valley near Almora

Location
- Country: India
- State: Uttarakhand, Uttar Pradesh

Physical characteristics
- Source
  - location: Dharapani Dhar, Kausani
- Mouth
  - location: Ramganga River, Uttar Pradesh, India
  - coordinates: 28°38′03″N 79°01′42″E
- Length: 168 km (104 mi)
- Basin size: 346 km^{2} (134 sq mi)

Basin features
- Tributaries
  - right: Suyal, Ramgad, Bhowaligad

Kosi River, also known as Koshi, is a tributary of the Ramganga River. It is an important river in the Kumaon region of Uttarakhand. Kair and Shisham forests are found on the banks of the river. The length of the Kosi river is 168 km (104 mi) and its basin is spread over an area of about 346 km^{2} (134 sq mi).

== Course ==
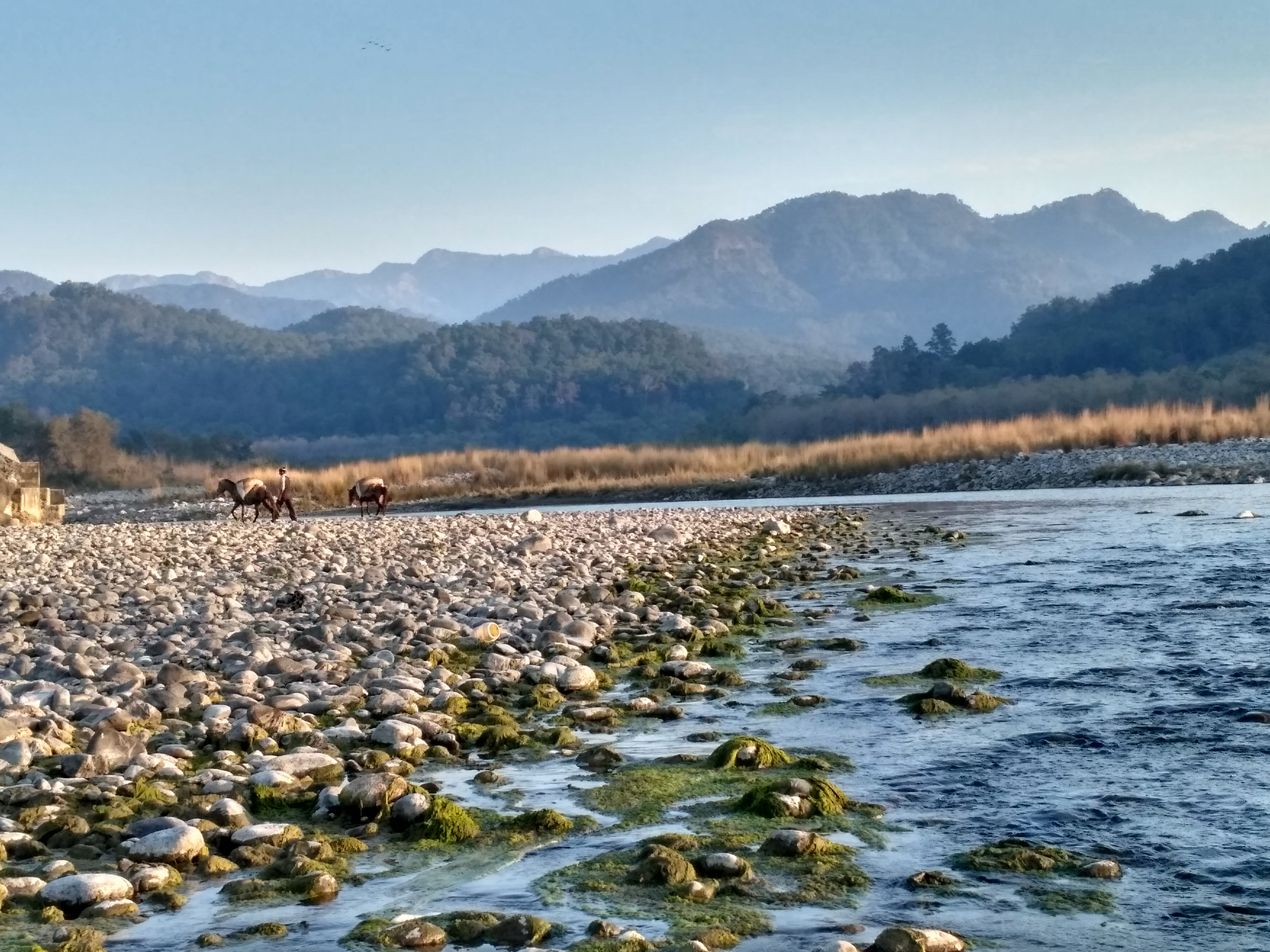
Kosi River flowing through the Jim Corbett National Park near Ramnagar

The Kosi originates from the Dharapani Dhar near Kausani, and flows towards the south. Flowing through the towns of Someshwar and Almora, it reaches Khwarab, where it is joined by the Suyal river. From Khwarab, it begins to flow west, passing through Khairna, Garampani and Betalghat. After reaching Salt Patti, it flows in the north-west direction till Mohaan, from where it takes a sharp bend and starts flowing towards the south-east. After passing through Dhikuli, it descends into the plains at Ramnagar. After traveling 70 mi (110 km) from Ramnagar, it enters the state of Uttar Pradesh at Sultanpur. It passes through the left of Rampur city and joins Ramganga near Chamraul village of Shahabad tehsil in Rampur district, Uttar Pradesh.
