= Kala Chauna =

- Village
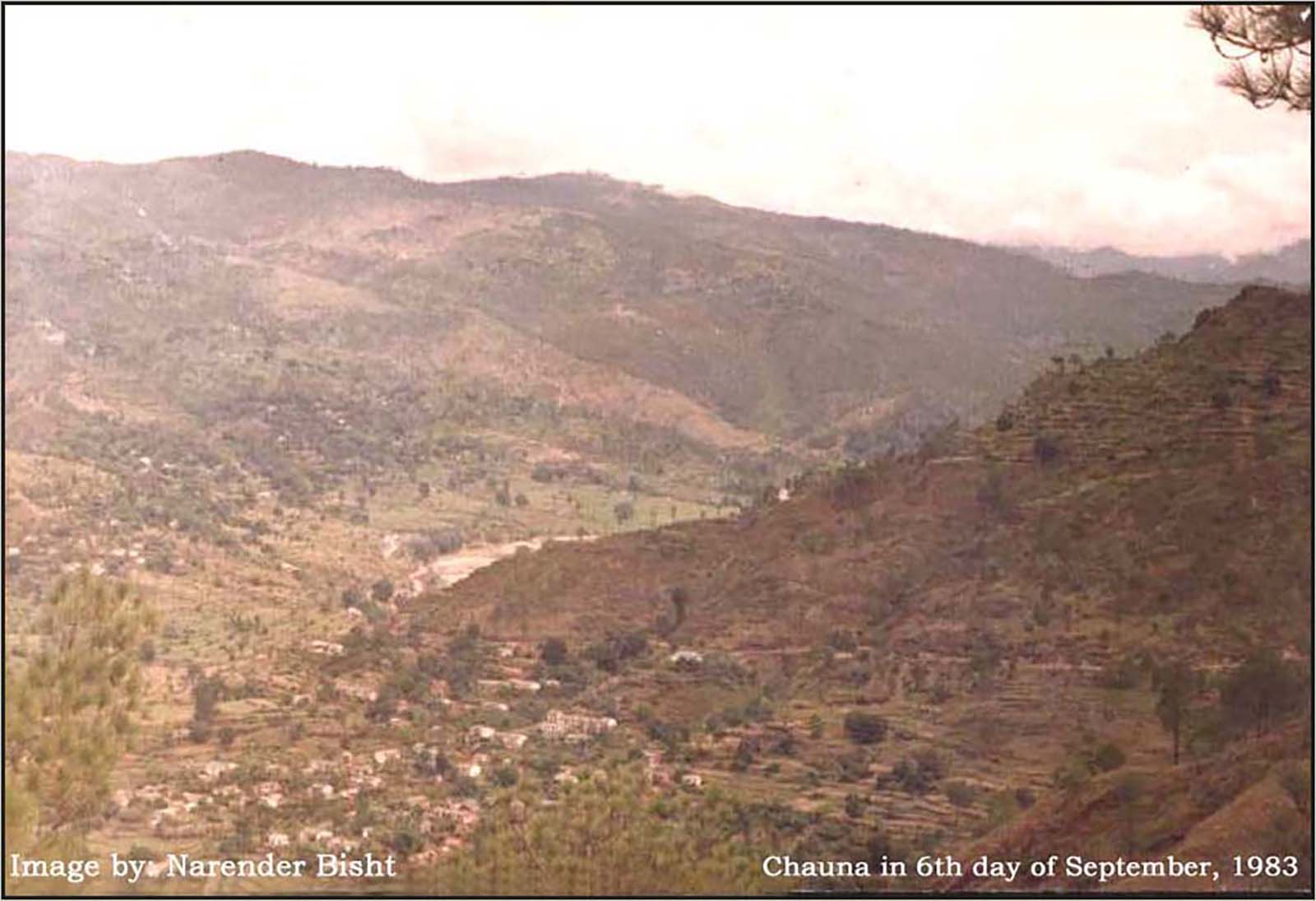
- Kala Chauna in 1983
- Interactive map of Kala Chauna
- Website: almora.nic.in

Kala Chauna is a village of Talla Gewar. It is located in Chaukhutiya block of Almora district in the Indian state of Uttarakhand.

This village is an historical village populated by Kumaoni Hindu Rajputs, known by their surname as Kanonia Bisht. It is recognized for the Kumanoni civilization and culture, hilly life style, natural environment, views and flat-fertile land.

== History ==
Kala Chauna is of the five villages in Talla Gewar founded by Maledev Kanauniya who was one of the Katyurivansh's emperors. This village belonged to his third son Kaldev. Kaldev called the village Kala Kanauniya.

== Geography ==
Kala Chaun is situated near the eastern bank of Ramganga River in the Talla Gewar valley of the southern Himalaya.

== Culture ==
The culture of the village is Kumaoni.

One of the historical Somanath Mela belongs to Kanauniya (resident of Kanauni, Dang, Kala Chauna and Adigram Kanauniya) and Masiwal (resident of Masi village). This fair starts in the first or second week of May from Somnatheshwar Mahadev near the left bank of the Ramganga. The fairs theme is the history of Kanauniya and Masiwal and the culture of Kumaon, The art of Kumaon and programmes of Pali Pachhaon range are offered. Kanauniya's (Vanshaj) attend from Salt range and repeat their ancient historical practices.

== Transport ==
The nearest airport is in Pant Nagar, about 175–200 km away.

The railway station of Ramnagar is about 115 km. and Kathgodam is located at about 161 km away.

Kala Chauna is served by Uttarakhand Roadways buses from Delhi and by various bus centres in the southern region of Uttarakhand..

== Educational institutions ==
- Government Primary School, Mehodhar, Kala Chauna: Hindi and English medium 1st to 5th class.
- Govt. Intermediate College, Masi: Hindi and English medium 6th to 12th class.
- Govt. Girls Intermediate College, Kanauni: Hindi and English medium 6th to 12th class.
- Govt. Degree College, Masi: Hindi and English medium B.A., B.(Com.), B. (Sc.), M.A., M.(Com.), M.(Sc.)
- Sarashwati Shishu Mandir, Masi: Hindi and English medium nursery to 8th class.
- Sher Singh Heet Bisht Memorial School, Masi: Hindi and English medium 6th to
- Ramganga Valley Public School, Masi
- Industrial Training Institute, Masi
