= Betalghat =

Town and tehsil in Uttarakhand, India

Betalghat बेतालघाट
- Tehsil headquarters and rural settlement
- Location in Uttarakhand, India Betalghat (India)
- Coordinates: 29°33′19″N 79°20′28″E
- Country: India
- State: Uttarakhand
- Division: Kumaon
- District: Nainital
- Tehsil: Betalghat
- Development block: Betalghat

Languages
  - Official: Hindi
- Time zone: UTC+5:30 (IST)
- PIN: 263134
- Vehicle registration: UK-04
- Census subdistrict code: 00339

Betalghat is a town and tehsil in Nainital district, Uttarakhand, India. As of 2011, it had a total population of 21,265 spread over 4,357 households.

Most people in the village speak Kumaoni and Hindi.

There is a riverside area in Betalghat along the Kosi River, a post office, and a marketplace. The nearest railway stations are in Ramnagar (65 km) and Kathgodam (87 km).

== Administration ==
Betalghat is among the nine tehsils of Nainital district and also among the district's eight community development blocks.

== Demographics ==
The demographic figures available from the 2011 Census of India relate to Betalghat tehsil rather than to the headquarters settlement alone. The tehsil had 21,265 residents, comprising 10,421 males and 10,844 females, living in 4,357 households. The sex ratio was approximately 1,041 females for every 1,000 males. There were 3,125 children below the age of seven. A total of 14,648 residents were recorded as literate, giving a literacy rate of approximately 80.75 per cent among the population aged seven and above. Male literacy was approximately 93.35 per cent and female literacy approximately 68.86 per cent.

The Scheduled Caste population was 6,553, constituting approximately 30.8 per cent of the tehsil's population. Nine residents were recorded as belonging to Scheduled Tribes. All 21,265 residents of the tehsil were classified as rural in the 2011 Census, and no statutory or census town was recorded within it.

== Education ==
Betalghat is a small town, so further students have to go to Haldwani, Nainital, or Ramnagar.

- Shaheed Khemchand Dorbi Government Post Graduate College
- Inter College, Betalghat
- Government Girls Inter College, Betalghat
- Sarswati Vidhya Mandir
- Aashram Padhti

== Health ==
Community Health Center (CHC) is situated near Government Inter College; the available facilities at CHC are very minimal. 90% of the local population is dependent on qualified hands for their healthcare.

== Transport ==
The Betalghat bridge, which connects Betalghat with Garampani, was built in 1990. Betalghat Taxi stands at the corner of this bridge.

There is a bridge on the Kosi River with a length of about 200 meters which connects Betalghat and Malli Seti, and further down this road connects to Ramnagar.

Well shuttled bus and taxi services are available for Ramnagar, Haldwani, Nainital, Ranikhet, Almora, Bhatrojkhan, and Garampani-Khairna.

No roadways are connected, and road conditions are very poor. There are three connecting roads from Khairna, two connecting roads from Bhatrojkhan, and three connecting roads from Ramnagar, but all are full of potholes.

After 5 p.m., no public transport is available.

Pantnagar is the nearest domestic airport and is about 112 km from Betalghat. There is no direct bus or taxi from Pantnagar Airport; to reach Betalghat, you will either have to book a private taxi from Pantnagar or first go to Haldwani, and then from Haldwani, take a bus or taxi to Betalghat.
