= NH 121 =

NH 121 may refer to:

- National Highway 121 (India)
- New Hampshire Route 121, United States
