= Garjiya Devi =

Hindu Temple in Uttarakhand

Garjiya Devi Temple
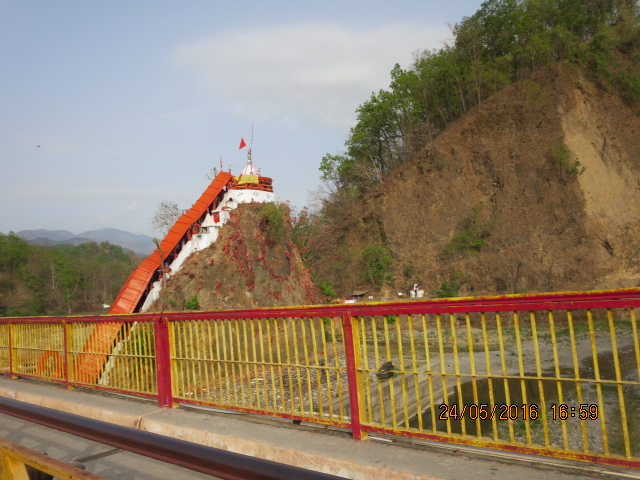
- Garjiya Devi Temple

- Location within Uttarakhand

Religion
- Affiliation: Hinduism
- District: Nainital
- Deity: Goddess Parvati
- Festival: Kartika Purnima

Location
- Location: Garjiya village, Nainital
- State: Uttarakhand
- Country: India
- Coordinates: 29°29′39″N 79°08′28″E

Architecture
- Type: Nagara
- Elevation: 60 ft (18 m)

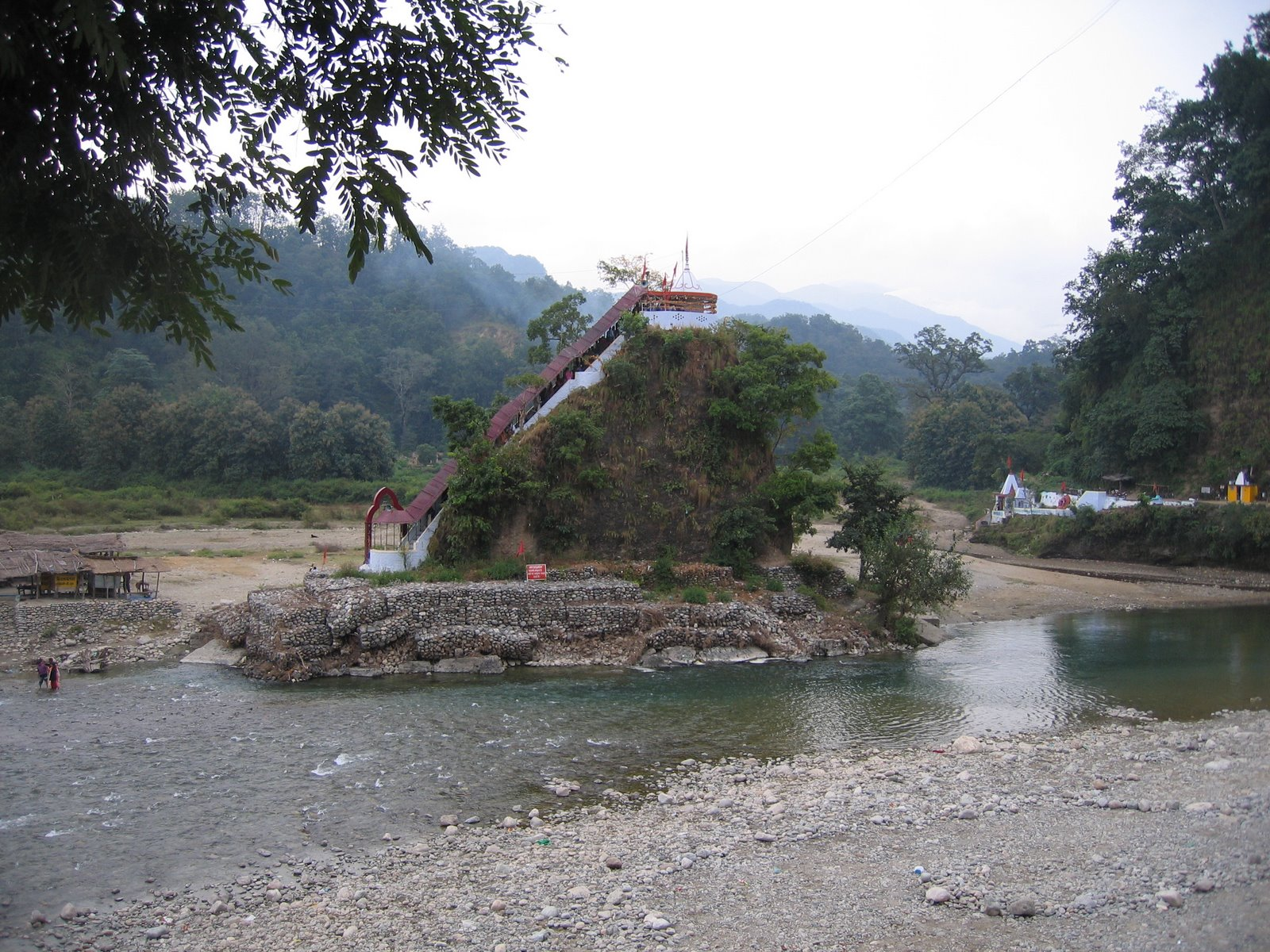
Garjiya Devi Temple on the Kosi River

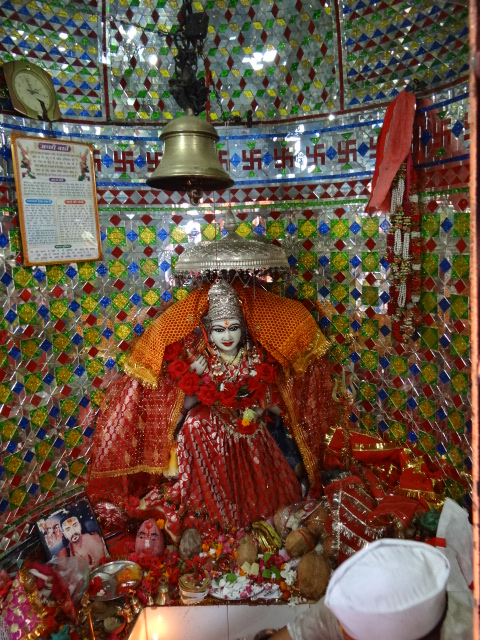
The statue of Garjiya Devi at Garjiya Devi Temple, Ramnagar

Garjiya Devi Temple is a hindu Devi temple located in the Garjiya village 14 km north of the city Ramnagar, Uttarakhand, India, on the outskirts of the Corbett National Park. It is a sacred Shakti shrine where Garjiya Devi is the presiding deity. The temple is Perched on a large mountain rock at an elevation of 60 feet above the ground in the Kosi river and is one of the most famous temples of the Nainital district, visited by thousands of devotees during Kartik Poornima, a Hindu holy day celebrated on the fifteenth lunar day of Kartik Purnima a full moon day falling either in November or December. During this time, the temple is adorned with colourful bulbs and diyas, exuding distinctive vibrancy. Various rituals and celebrations further enhance the temple's uniqueness during this festival.

Garjiya Mata Temple is a Hindu shrine dedicated to the Goddess Garjiya, believed to be the reincarnation of Goddess Parvati.

Beyond its spiritual importance, the temple's picturesque location also contributes to its popularity. Nestled beside the flowing river, amid lush greenery and surrounded by distant hills, it offers a visually appealing experience.

The first priest was Pt. Keshav Dutt Pandey who began worship of Devi Girija. There is also a statue of LakshmiNarayan of 9th century, made from black granite. Many people from nearby areas go there every day to worship in the temple. Many people bathe in the Kosi river near Garjiya temple.

== Best Time to Visit Garjiya Temple ==
The best time to visit Garjiya Temple is from October to May, as this period also allows for Corbett National Park safaris. Moreover, the major festivals celebrated at Garjiya Temple occur during the winter season.

== Festivals ==
The temple is also known as the festival of lights of the gods. The Kartik Purnima festival also coincides with the Sikh festival of Guru Nanak Jayanti.

== See also ==
- List of Hindu festivals
