= Ramganga Dam =

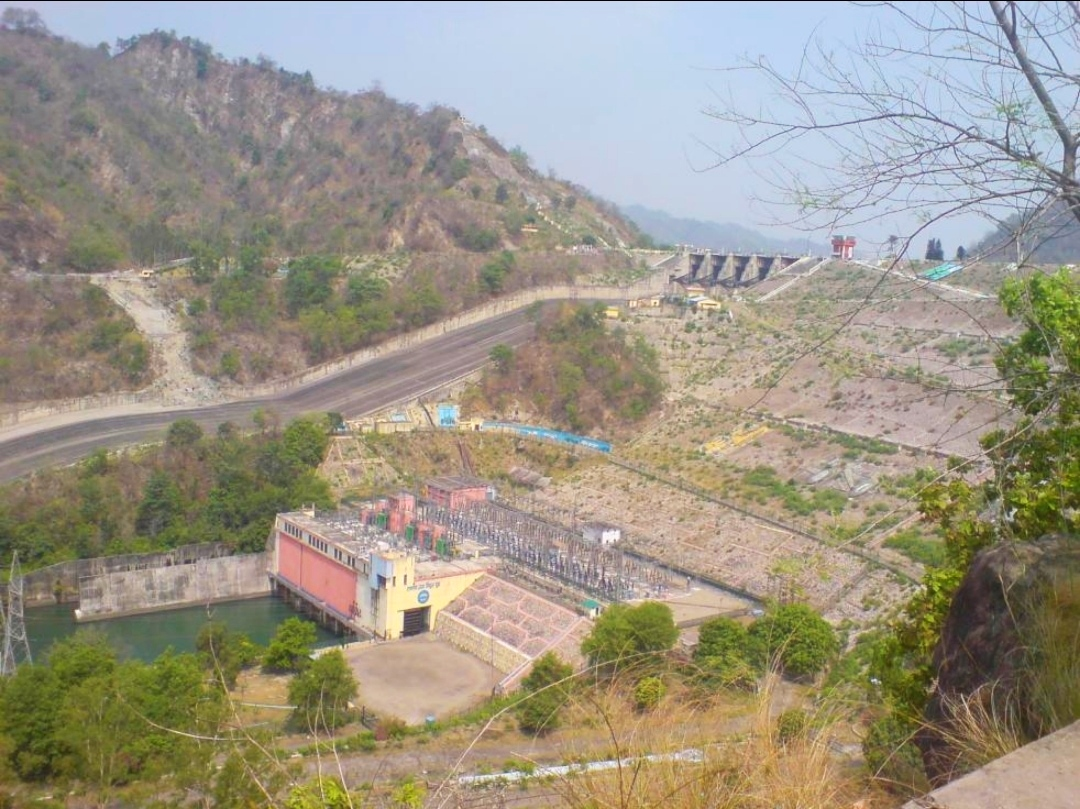
- Ramganga Dam

- Location within Uttarakhand Location within India
- Country: India
- Location: Kalagarh
- Coordinates: 29°31′10″N 78°45′31″E
- Status: Operational
- Construction began: 1961
- Opening date: 1974
- Construction cost: Rs. 172.12 crores
- Owner: Uttaranchal Jal Vidyut Nigam Limited

Dam and spillways
- Type of dam: Embankment
- Impounds: Ramganga River
- Height: 128 m (420 ft)
- Length: 630 m (2,067 ft)
- Dam volume: 10,000,000 m^{3} (13,079,506 cu yd)
- Spillway capacity: 8,467 m^{3}/s (299,009 cu ft/s)

Reservoir
- Total capacity: 244,960,000 m^{3} (198,592 acre⋅ft) (8.65 tmc ft)
- Active capacity: 219,600,000 m^{3} (178,033 acre⋅ft) (7.76 tmc ft)
- Catchment area: 3,134 km^{2} (1,210 sq mi)
- Surface area: 78.31 km^{2} (30 sq mi)

Power Station
- Decommission date: 1975-1977
- Hydraulic head: 84.4 m (277 ft) (design)
- Turbines: 3 x 66 MW Francis-type
- Installed capacity: 198 MW

The Ramganga Dam, also known as the Kalagarh Dam, is an embankment dam on the Ramganga River 3 km (2 mi) upstream of Kalagarh in Pauri Garhwal district, Uttarakhand, India. It is located within the Jim Corbett National Park.

== Background ==
The dam is part of the Ramganga Multipurpose Project — an irrigation and hydroelectric project. It supports a 198 MW power station and provides water for the irrigation of 57,500 ha (142,086 acres) of farmland. In addition, it provides for flood control and recreation. Construction on the dam began in 1961 and it was completed in 1974. The three generators in the power station were commissioned in December 1975, November 1976 and March 1977.

== Design ==
The dam is a 128 m (420 ft) tall and 630 m (2,067 ft) long earth and rock-fill embankment dam with 10,000,000 m^{3} (13,079,506 cu yd) of fill. The dam's spillway is controlled by five gates and has a maximum discharge of 8,467 m^{3}/s (299,009 cu ft/s). To support the reservoir's elevation, there is a 72 m (236 ft) tall saddle dam on the reservoir's rim 2.5 km (2 mi) to the northeast on the Chui Sot River. The reservoir created by both dams has a 244,700,000 m^{3} (198,382 acre⋅ft) capacity of which 219,000,000 m^{3} (177,546 acre⋅ft) is active (or "useful") capacity. The reservoir has a surface of 78.31 km^{2} (30 sq mi) and a catchment area of 3,134 km^{2} (1,210 sq mi). The power station at the toe of the dam contains three 66 MW Francis turbine-generators and is afforded 84.4 m (277 ft) of design hydraulic head. Below the dam is a system of over 6,300 km (3,915 mi) of canals supported by three barrages and 82 km (51 mi) of main feeder canal.

== See also ==
- List of power stations in India
