= David Hunt (ornithologist) =

British ornithologist

David Bassil Hunt (1934 – 22 February 1985) was an English ornithologist who worked mostly on the Isles of Scilly, an archipelago off the south west coast of England. He was killed by a tiger, the first European to suffer this fate for many decades.

== Life ==
Born in 1934 in Devonport, and given the middle name of Bassil, which was his mother's surname before his parents' marriage, Hunt was brought up on the Yealm estuary and educated at Gresham's School, Norfolk. In 1954 he began to study art, then went to Germany to work as a jazz trombonist. On returning to England, he worked as a horticulturalist, which in 1964 took him to the Island Hotel on Tresco, Isles of Scilly, where he was hired as gardener. He lived in the Islands for many years, also working in the summer as an international birdwatching tour guide.

== Death ==
In February 1985, Hunt was killed by a Bengal tiger in Jim Corbett National Park, Nainital district, Uttarakhand, India, while leading a bird-watching tour there. Later in the year his autobiography, Confessions of a Scilly Birdman, was published. As a result of his death, visitors are now forbidden to walk in the Jim Corbett National Park at any time unless they are accompanied by a certified park guide.
