= Ramganga =

The Ramganga is a tributary of the river Ganges, originating in Uttarakhand state, India.

== Ramganga West ==
Ramganga West
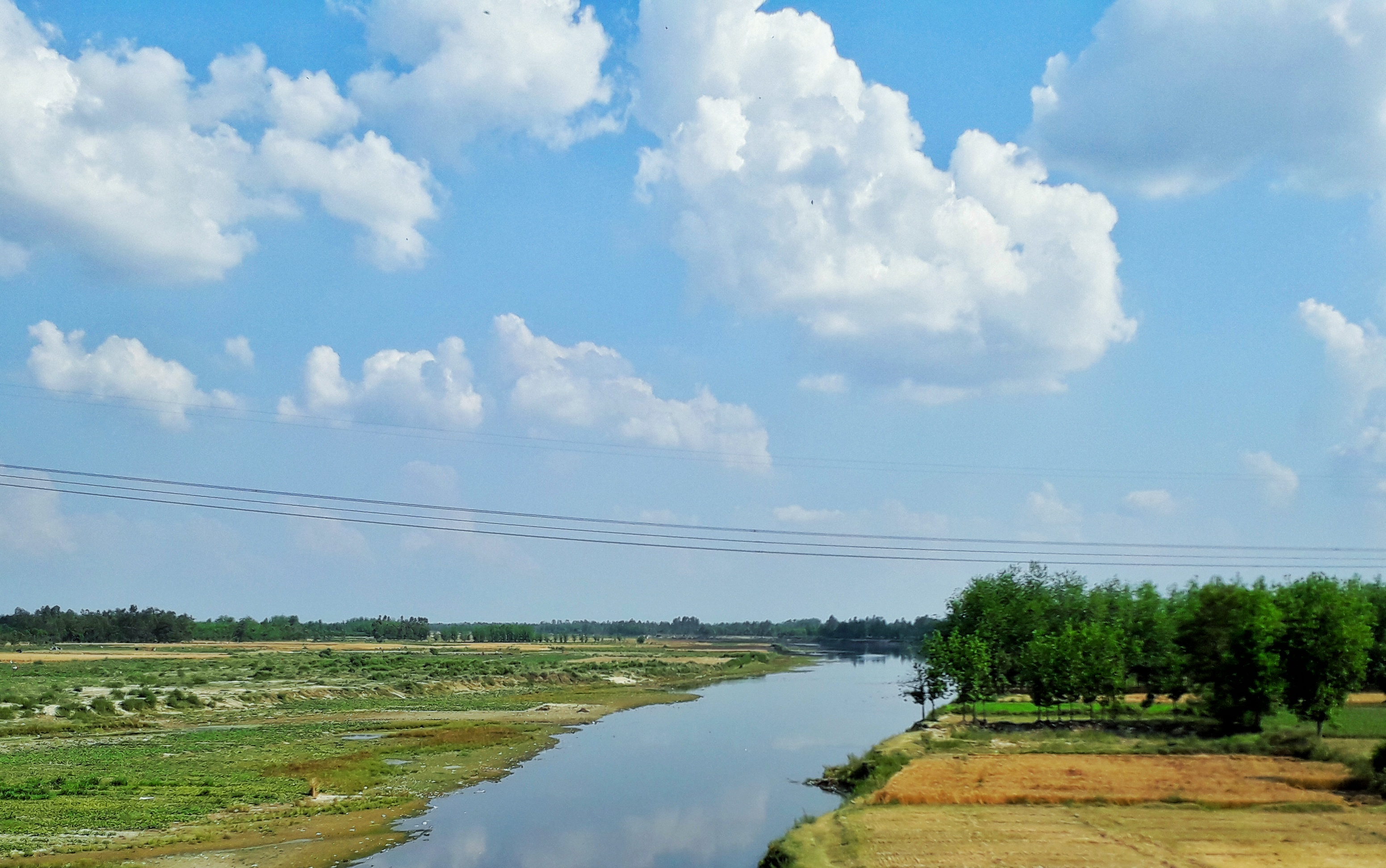
- Ramganga near Moradabad, Uttar Pradesh

Location
- Country: India
- State: Uttarakhand, Uttar Pradesh
- Region: North India

Physical characteristics
- Source: Dudhatoli
  - location: Dudhatoli range, Pauri Garhwal, Uttarakhand, India
- Mouth: Ganges
  - location: Hardoi district, Uttar Pradesh, India
  - elevation: 130 m (430 ft)
- Length: 596 km (370 mi)
- Basin size: 30,641 km^{2} (11,831 sq mi)
- Discharge
  - location: 27.177996°N 79.844112°E
  - average: 900 m^{3}/s (32,000 cu ft/s)

Ramganga West River originates from Dudhatoli or Doodhatoli ranges

=== Course ===
The Ramganga River originates in the southern slopes of Dudhatoli Hill in Chamoli district of the Indian state of Uttarakhand. The source of the river, known as "Diwali Khal", is located in Gairsain tehsil at 30°05′00″N 79°18′00″E. The river flows by the town of Gairsain, however the town is located at a much higher altitude than the river. The river then enters the Almora district of Kumaon through a deep and narrow valley in Chaukhutia tehsil. Emerging from there, it turns southwest and receives the Tadagatal River, wandering widely around the southeastern boundary of Lohabagarhi. It then proceeds further in the same direction and reaches Ganai, where it receives the Kharogad coming from Dunagiri from the left and Khetasargad coming from Pandnakhal from the right.

Coming out of Ganai, it flows towards the Talla Giwar region, where there is an open valley with alluvial land along and around the river, which is extensively cultivated and irrigated by the waters of the river. After Masi, the valley shrinks to some extent, but some fertile plains are still found up to the Briddhakedar temple. Here it receives the Vinod River, which originates from Chaukot, and from this point onwards the flow of the river turns southwards, and mountains filled with fertile soil and rocks can be seen on either side of the river. Eleven miles further from Masi, it reaches Bhikiyasain, where it receives the Gagas from the east and Naurargad from the south. Here the valley widens once again, but irrigation still depends mainly on minor streams. From Bhikiyasain the river takes a sharp turn towards the west and receives Nail River from Salt and Devgad from Garhwal. It forms the boundary of Almora and Pauri Garhwal districts to some extent after the Marchula Bridge. The river then enters Bhabar and flows westward from Patli Dun into the Jim Corbett National Park. It receives Mandal River near Kandanala.

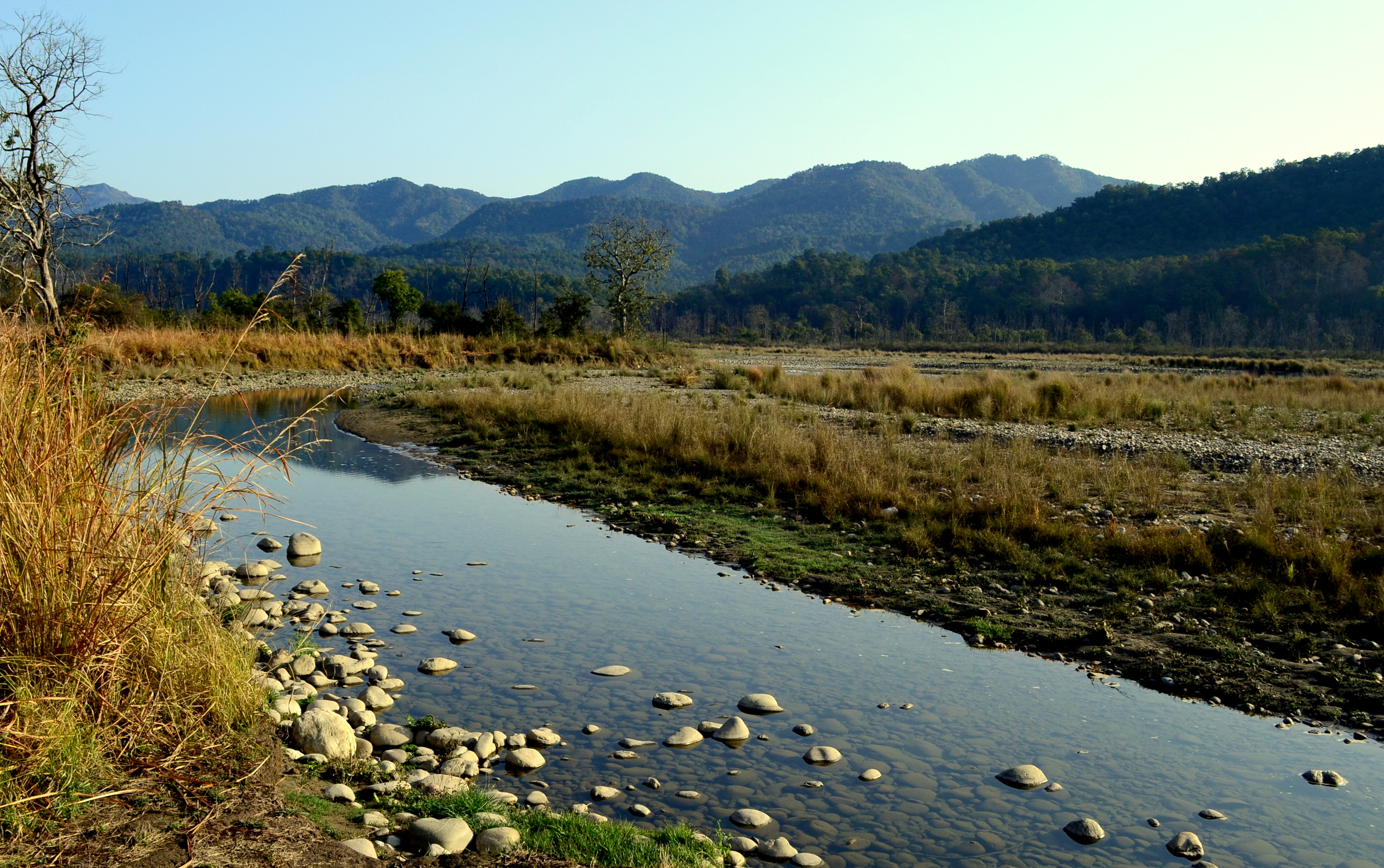
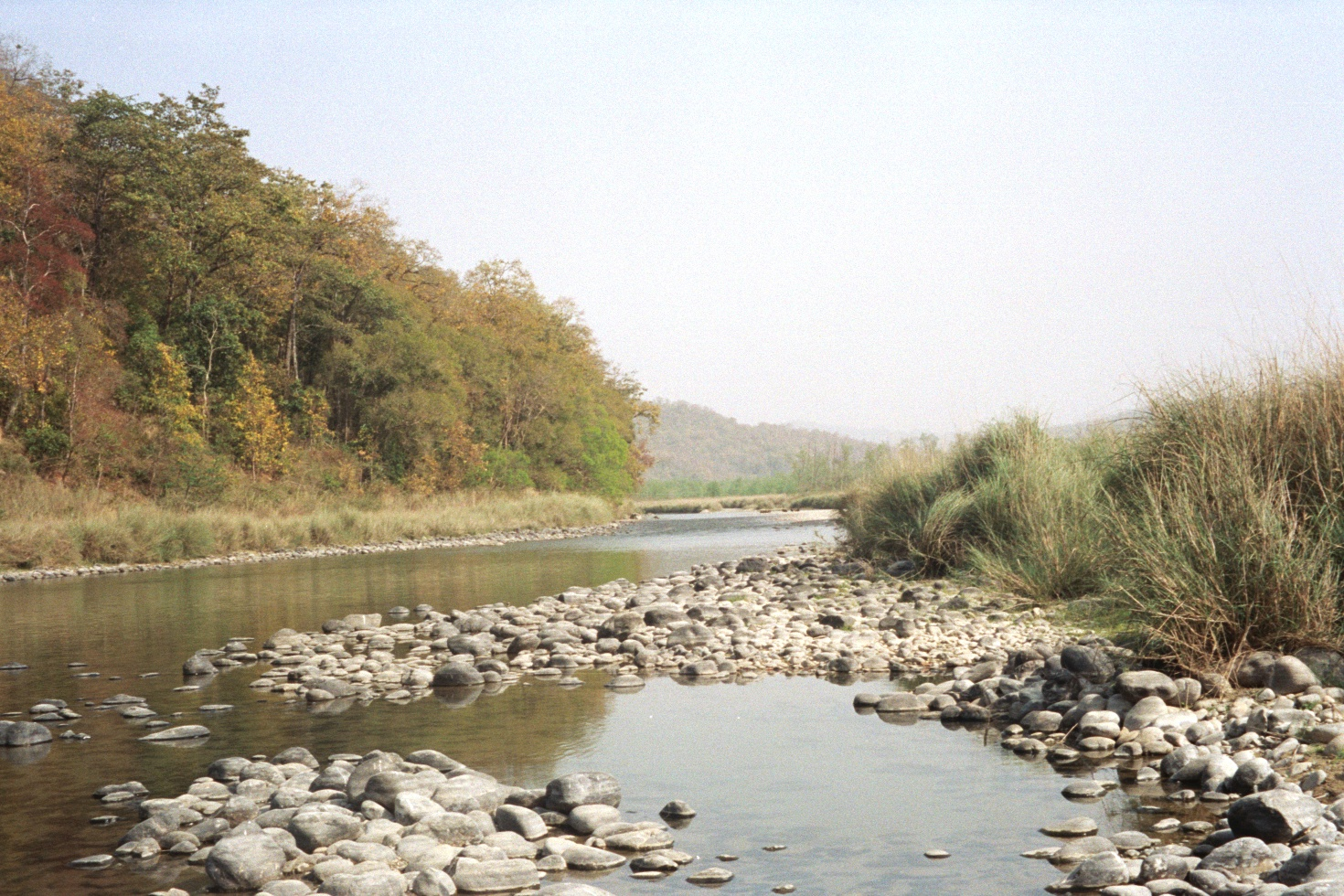
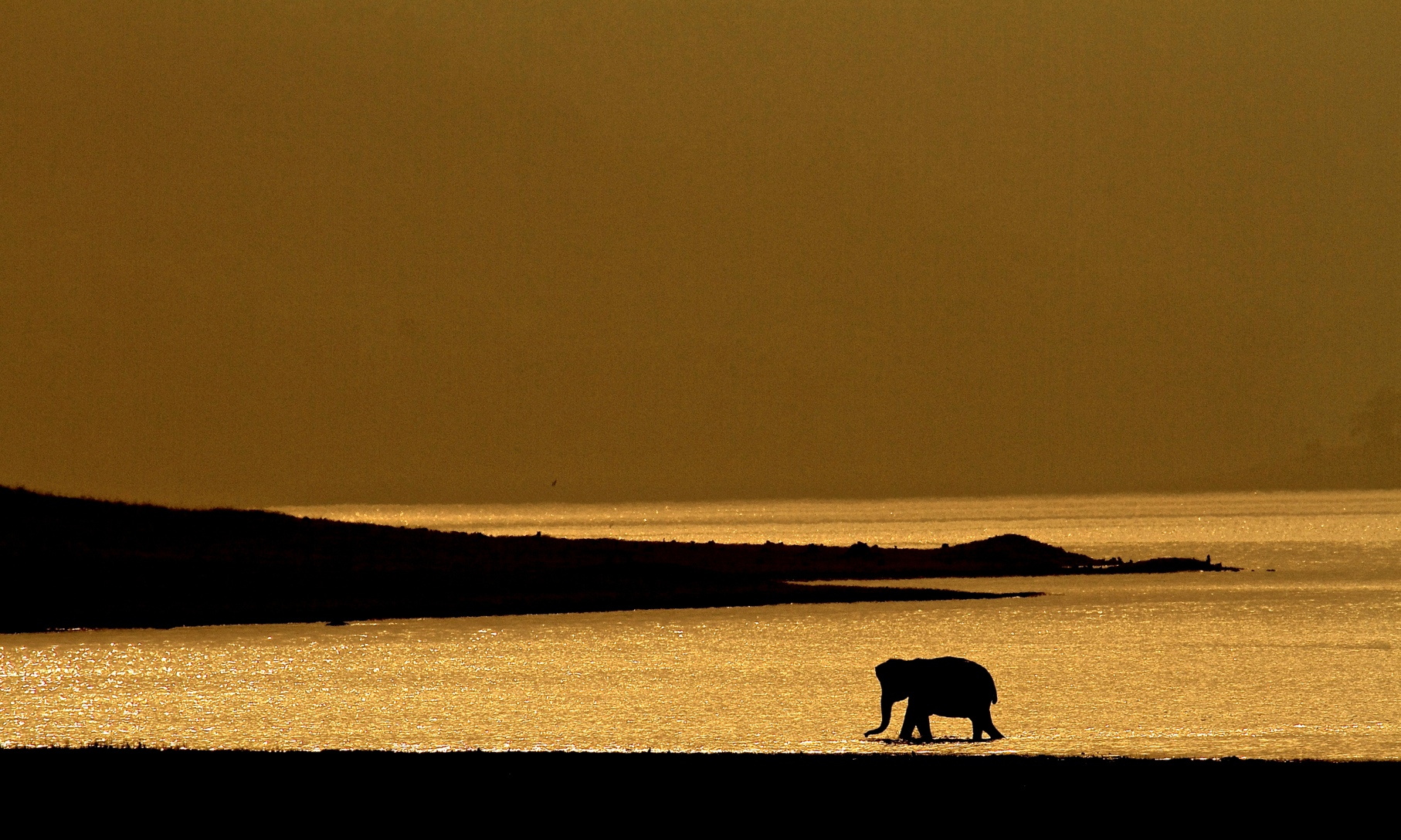
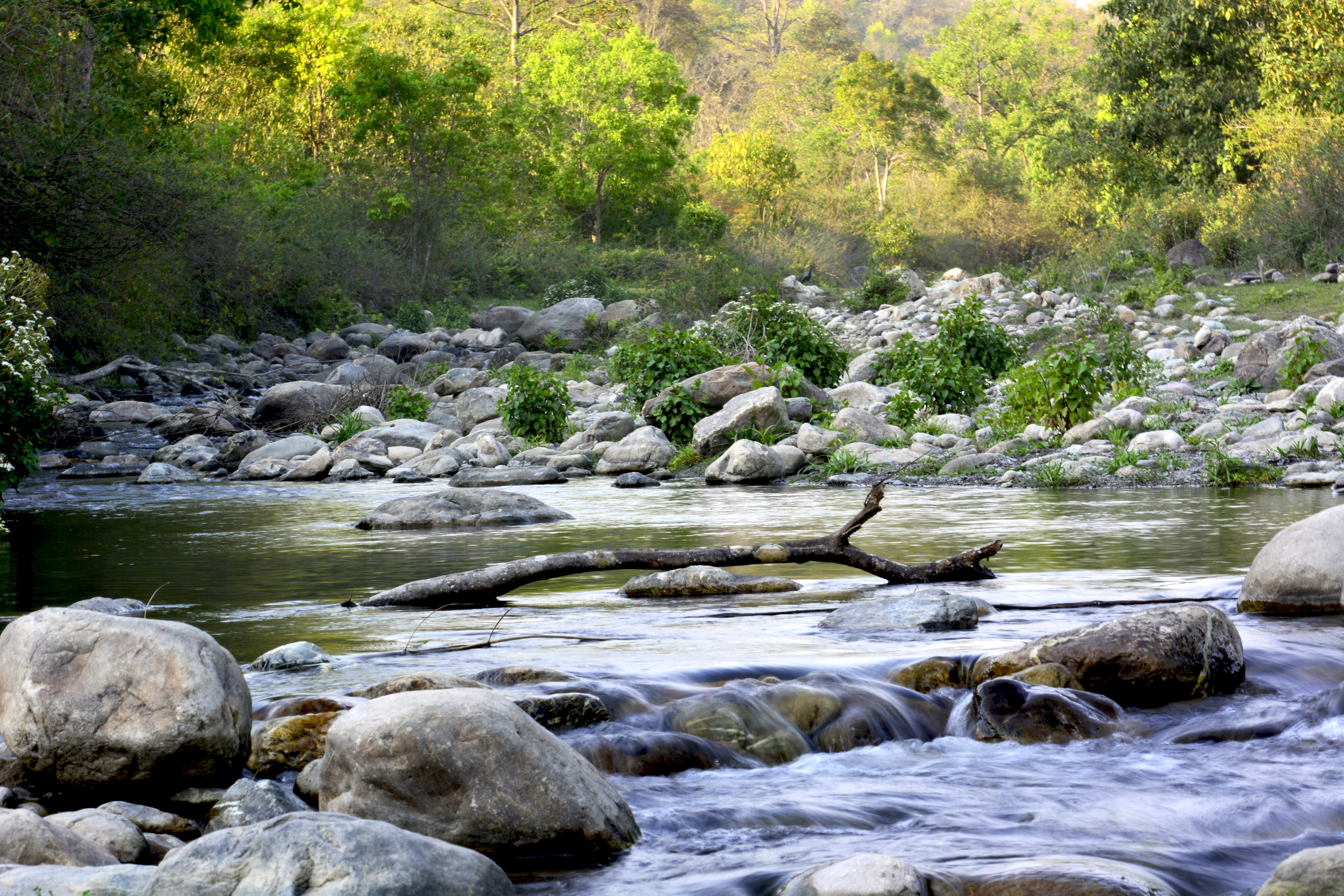
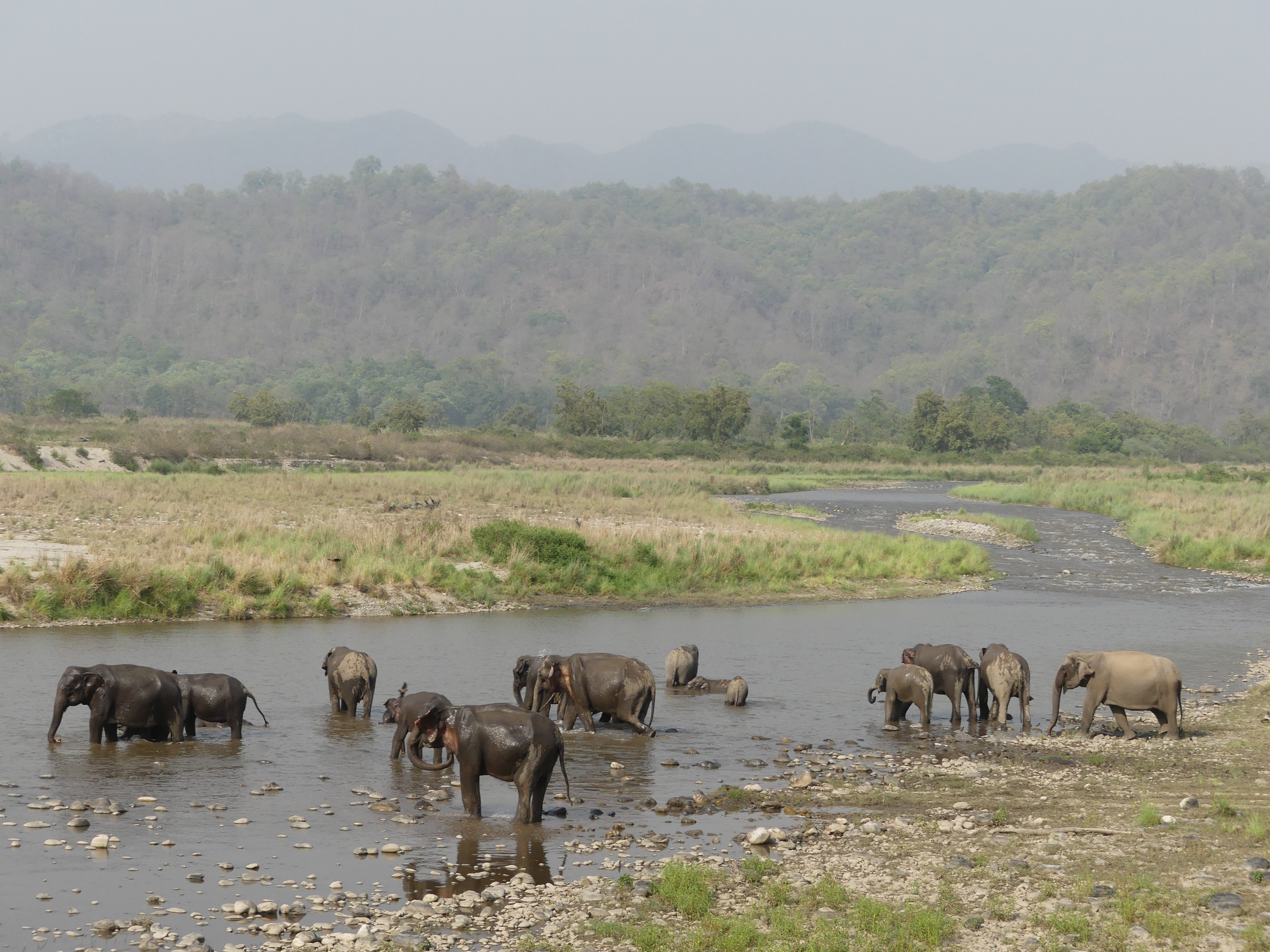
The Ramganga in the Jim Corbett National Park.

Ramganga, which is already a large river now, enters the plains at Kalagarh in Bijnor district of Uttar Pradesh, where a dam has been constructed on the river for the purpose of irrigation and hydroelectric production. About 15 miles from here it is joined by the Khoh, after which it enters the Moradabad district, where on the alluvial lowlands it flows in a southeastern direction with a very rapid flow, and forms the boundary between Thakurdwara and Kanth tehsils. The Ramganga receives several tributaries in Moradabad, almost all on its left bank, most of which are Tarai streams flowing towards south or south-west. The first among them is the Phika, which rises in the Kumaon hills and joins the Ramganga near Surjannagar. The Khalia stream, which drains the north-western part of Thakurdwara joins the Ramganga at Daulatpur Tigri. After receiving the Dhela River at Bhojpur, the Ramganga flows through the city of Moradabad, which is situated on its right bank, and receives the Rajera River near Dalpatpur. The river then continues further towards Rampur district, where it receives the Koshi River near Chamraul in Shahabad tehsil. It crosses Rampur with the same direction and strong currents as Moradabad and reaches Bareilly district.

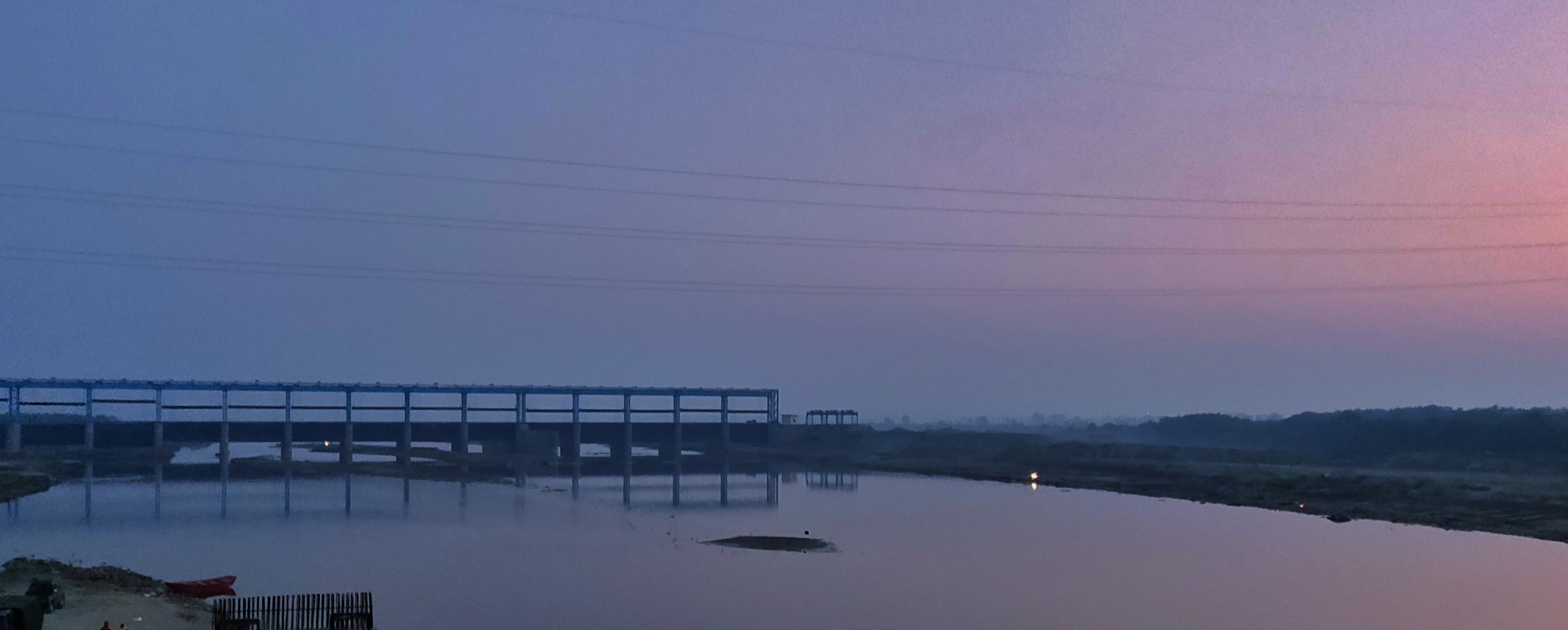
Ramganga river at Bareilly

The Ramganga flows through the Bareilly district mainly in the southeastern direction. It receives the combined stream of Bhakra and Kichha (also called Baigul) from its left and the Gagan River from its right, after which it reaches near Bareilly city, which is located at a distance of about 10 km on its left side. Here it receives the Deoranian and Nakatiya rivers from its left – both rivers flow through Bareilly. An annual fair is held on the banks of the river on the occasion of Ganga Dussehra in Chaubari village near Bareilly in the month of September–October. Flowing further through Badaun and Shahjahanpur and Hardoi districts, it finally joins the Ganga river at village Katri Chandapur in the Hardoi district of U.P., after covering a total distance of about 373 miles.

== Ramganga East ==
Ramganga East
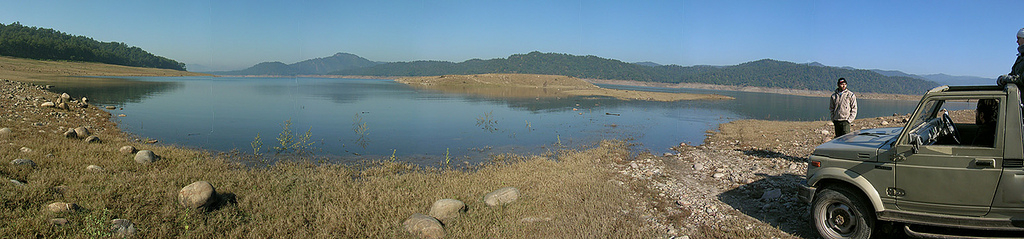

Physical characteristics
- Source
  - location: Himalayas- Namik Glacier, Pithoragarh district
- Mouth
  - location: Flows into River Kali

Another Ramganga, called Ramganga East, originates from the Namik Glacier in Pithoragarh district of Uttarakhand and flows towards south-east. The river is fed by numerous small and big rivers and finally joins river the Sarju at Rameshwar near Ghat of Pithoragarh. The Sarju, in turn, converges with the Kali (Sharda), which in turn converges with the Ghaghara River, which in turn is the largest tributary of the Ganges by volume.

== Sources ==
- Jain, Sharad K.; Agarwal, Pushpendra K.; Singh, Vijay P. (2007). Hydrology and water resources of India. Springer. Bibcode:2007hwri.book.....J. ISBN 978-1402051791.
