= Jim Corbett National Park =

National park in India

- IUCN category II (national park)
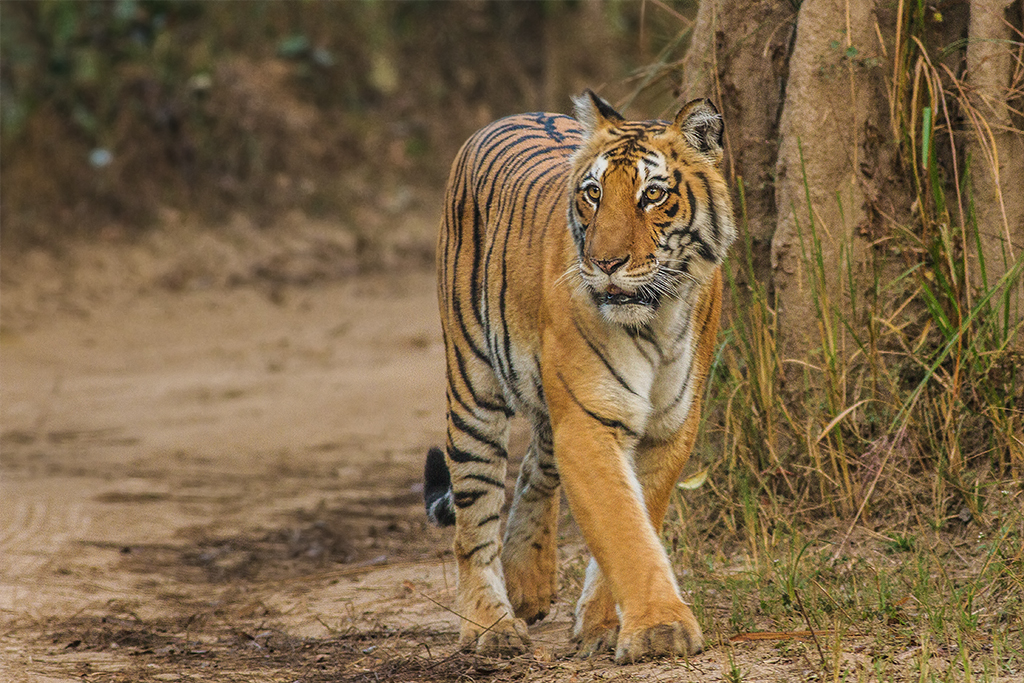
- Bengal tiger in Corbett National Park

- Location within Uttarakhand Location within India
- Interactive map of Jim Corbett National Park
- Location: Nainital, Uttarakhand, India
- Nearest city: Ramnagar, Kotdwar
- Coordinates: 29°32′55″N 78°56′7″E
- Area: 520.8 km^{2} (201.1 sq mi)
- Max. elevation: 1,040 m (3,410 ft)
- Established: 1936
- Visitors: 365,000 (in 2023-24)
- Governing body: NTCA
- Website: corbettonline.uk.gov.in

Jim Corbett National Park is a national park in the Nainital district of the state of Uttarakhand, India. It was established in 1936 as the country's first national park and is named in honour of Jim Corbett, who had played a leading role in its establishment. It was the first to come under the Project Tiger initiative and encompasses an area of 520.8 km^{2} (201.1 sq mi) consisting of hills, riverine belts, marshy depressions, grasslands and a large lake at an elevation range of 400–1,220 m (1,300–4,000 ft). It receives rainfall from July to September. Almost 73% of the national park is covered by dense moist deciduous forest dominated by Shorea robusta, peepal, rohini, and mango trees among 110 tree species and 617 different plant species. Grasslands cover about 10% of its total area. It harbours 50 mammal species, 580 bird species and 25 reptile species. The increase in tourist activities continues to present a serious challenge to the park's ecological balance.

== History ==
Some areas of the park were formerly part of the princely state of Tehri Garhwal. The forests were cleared by the Uttarakhand Forest Department to make the area less vulnerable to Rohilla invaders. The Raja of Tehri formally ceded a part of his princely state to the East India Company in return for their assistance in ousting the Gurkhas from his domain. The Buksas—a tribe from the Terai—settled on the land and began growing crops, but in the early 1860s they were evicted with the advent of British rule.

Efforts to save the forests of the region began in the 19th century under Major Ramsay, the British officer who was in-charge of the area during those times. The first step in the protection of the area began in 1868 when the British forest department established control over the land and prohibited cultivation and the operation of cattle stations. In 1879 these forests were constituted into a reserve forest where restricted felling was permitted.

In the early 1900s, several Britishers, including E. R. Stevans and E. A. Smythies, suggested the setting up of a national park on this soil. The British administration considered the possibility of creating a game reserve there in 1907. It was only in the 1930s that the process of demarcation for such an area got underway. A reserve area known as Hailey National Park covering 323.75 km^{2} (125.00 sq mi) was created in 1936, when Sir Malcolm Hailey was the Governor of United Provinces, and Asia's first national park came into existence. Hunting was not allowed in the reserve, only timber cutting for domestic purposes was permitted. Soon after the establishment of the reserve, rules prohibiting the killing and capture of mammals, reptiles, and birds within its boundaries were passed.

The reserve was renamed Ramganga National Park in 1954–1955 and was again renamed in 1955–1956 to Corbett National Park after author and naturalist Jim Corbett. The park fared well during the 1930s under

an elected administration. But during the Second World War, it suffered from excessive poaching and timber cutting. Over time, the area in the reserve was increased to 797.72 km^{2} (308.00 sq mi) were added in 1991 as a buffer zone to the Corbett Tiger Reserve. The 1991 addition included the entire Kalagarh forest division, assimilating the 301.18 km^{2} (116.29 sq mi) area of Sonanadi Wildlife Sanctuary as a part of the Kalagarh division. It was chosen in 1974 as the location for launching the Project Tiger wildlife conservation project. The reserve is administered from its headquarters in the Nainital district.

Corbett National Park is one of the thirteen protected areas covered by the World Wide Fund For Nature under their Terai Arc Landscape Program. The program aims to protect three of the five terrestrial flagship species, the tiger, the Asian elephant and the Indian rhinoceros by restoring wildlife corridors to link 13 protected areas of Nepal and India and to enable wildlife migration.

== Geography ==
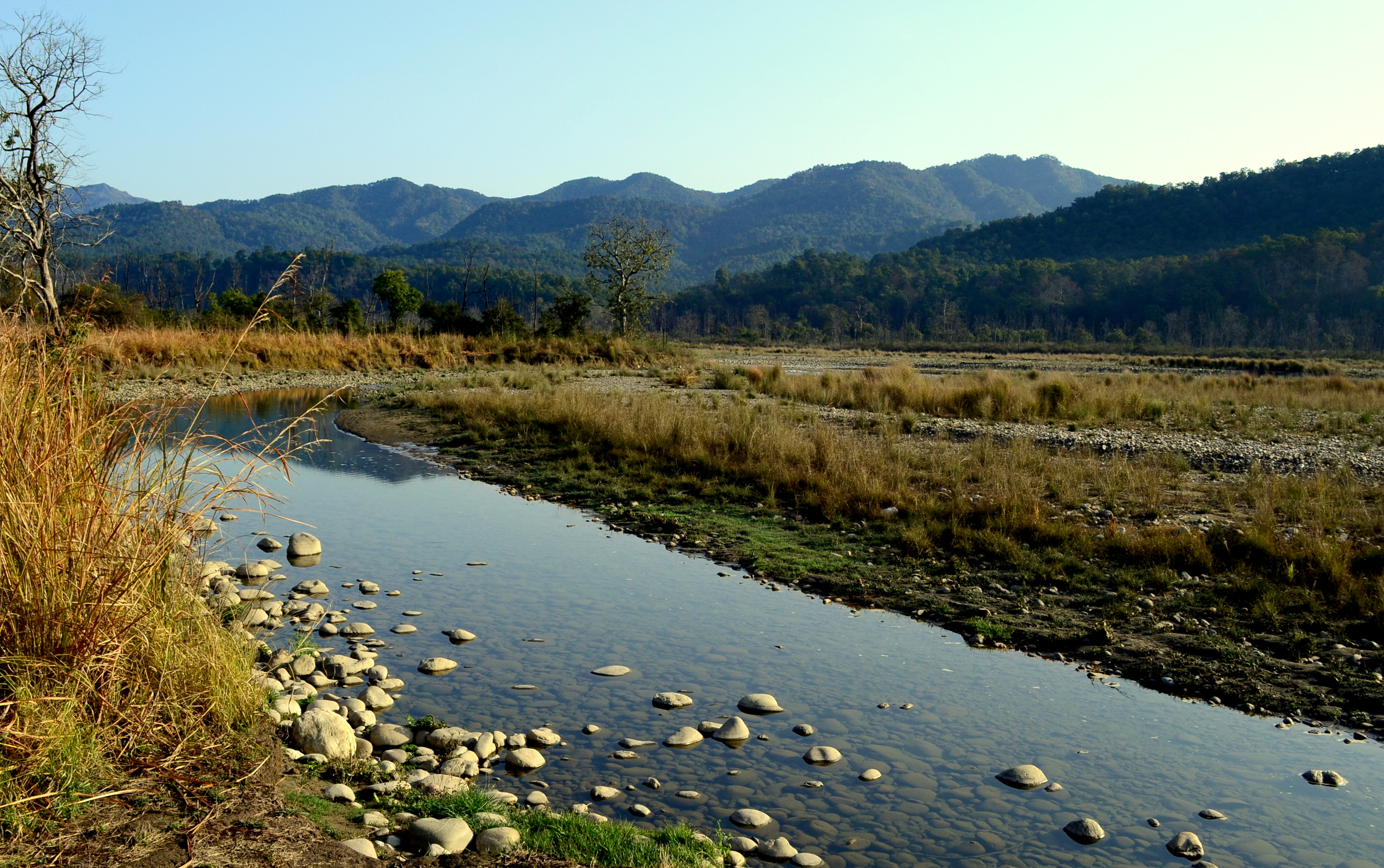
Landscape in Jim Corbett National Park

Location of Corbett National Park in Uttarakhand
M: municipality, NP: National Park, D: Dam

Jim Corbett National Park is located partly along Doon Valley between the Lesser Himalaya in the north and the Siwalik Hills in the south; it has a sub-Himalayan belt structure. The upper tertiary rocks are exposed towards the base of the Shiwalik range and hard sandstone units form broad ridges. Characteristic longitudinal valleys, geographically termed Doons, or Duns can be seen formed along the narrow tectonic zones between lineaments. The elevation of the region ranges between 360 m (1,180 ft) and 1,040 m (3,410 ft). It has numerous ravines, ridges, minor streams and small plateaus with varying aspects and degrees of slope. The park encompasses the Patli Dun valley formed by the river Ramganga. Its present area is 1,288.31 km^{2} (497.42 sq mi) including a 822 km^{2} (317 sq mi) core zone and 466.31 km^{2} (180.04 sq mi) of buffer area.

=== Climate ===
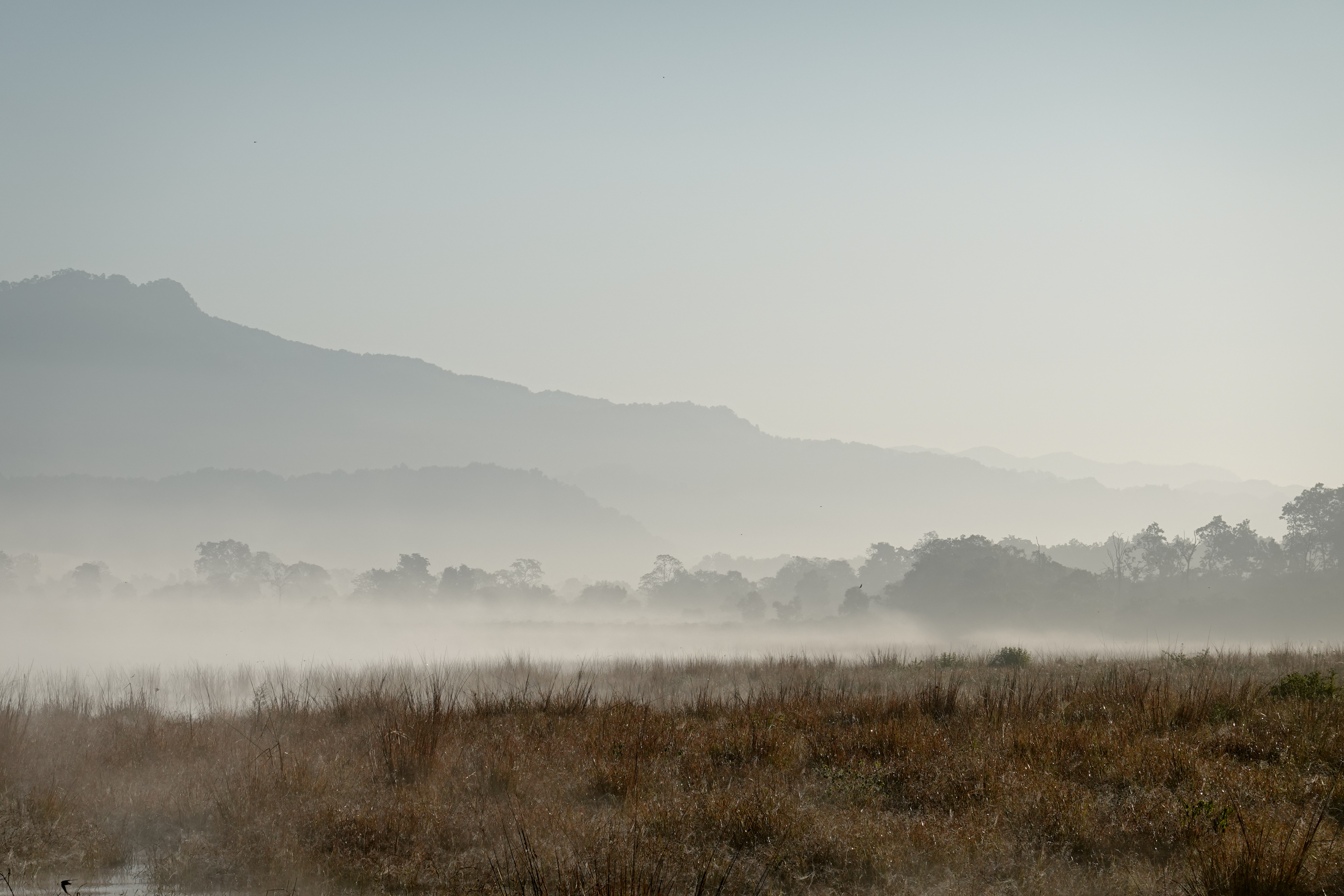
Morning fog in winter, Dhikala, Dec 2019

The weather in the park is temperate compared to most other protected areas of India. The temperature may vary from 5 °C (41 °F) to 30 °C (86 °F) during the winter and some mornings are foggy. Summer temperatures normally do not rise above 40 °C (104 °F). Rainfall ranges from light during the winter to heavy during the monsoonal summer.

== Flora ==
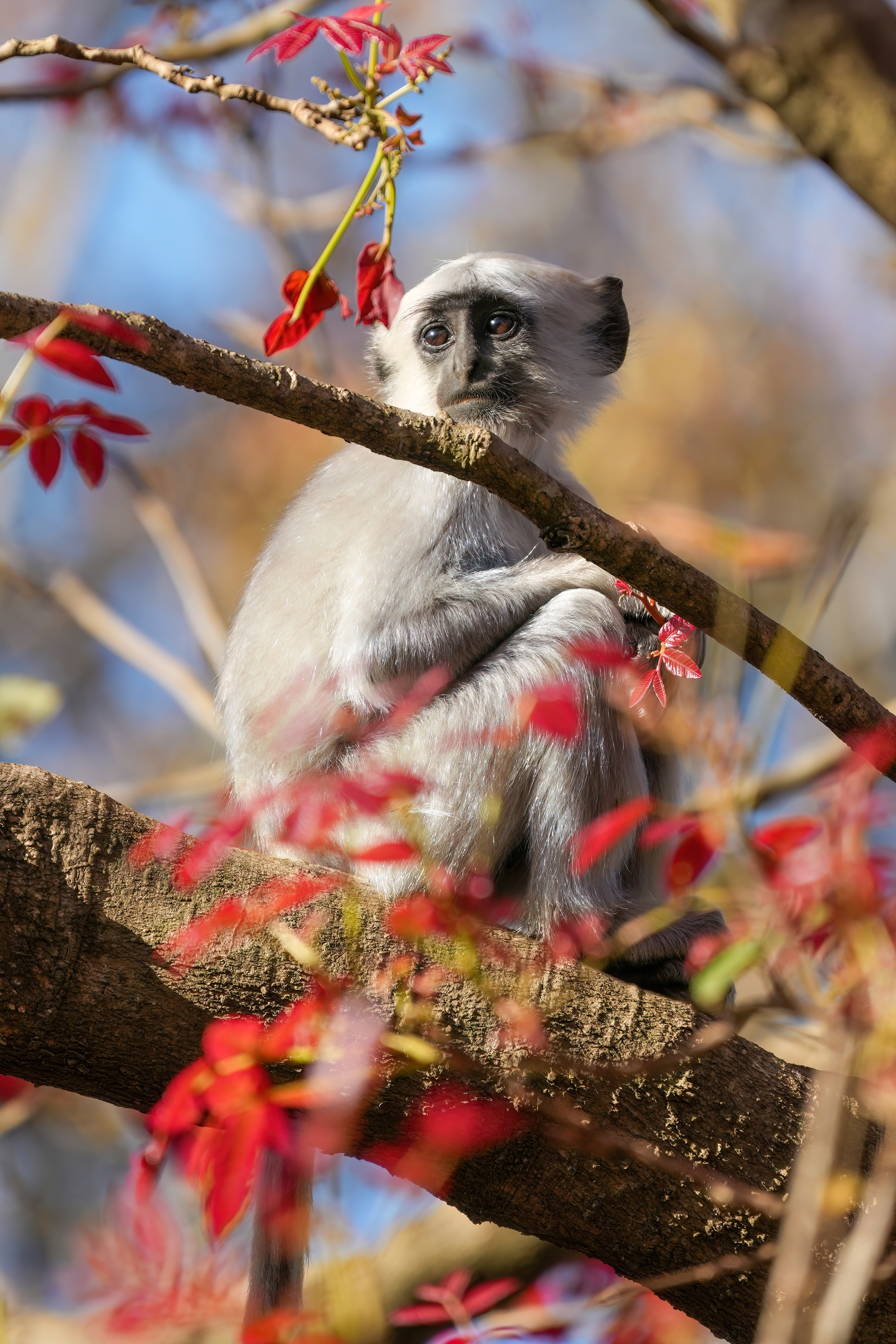
Juvenile northern plains gray langur in Jim Corbett National Park

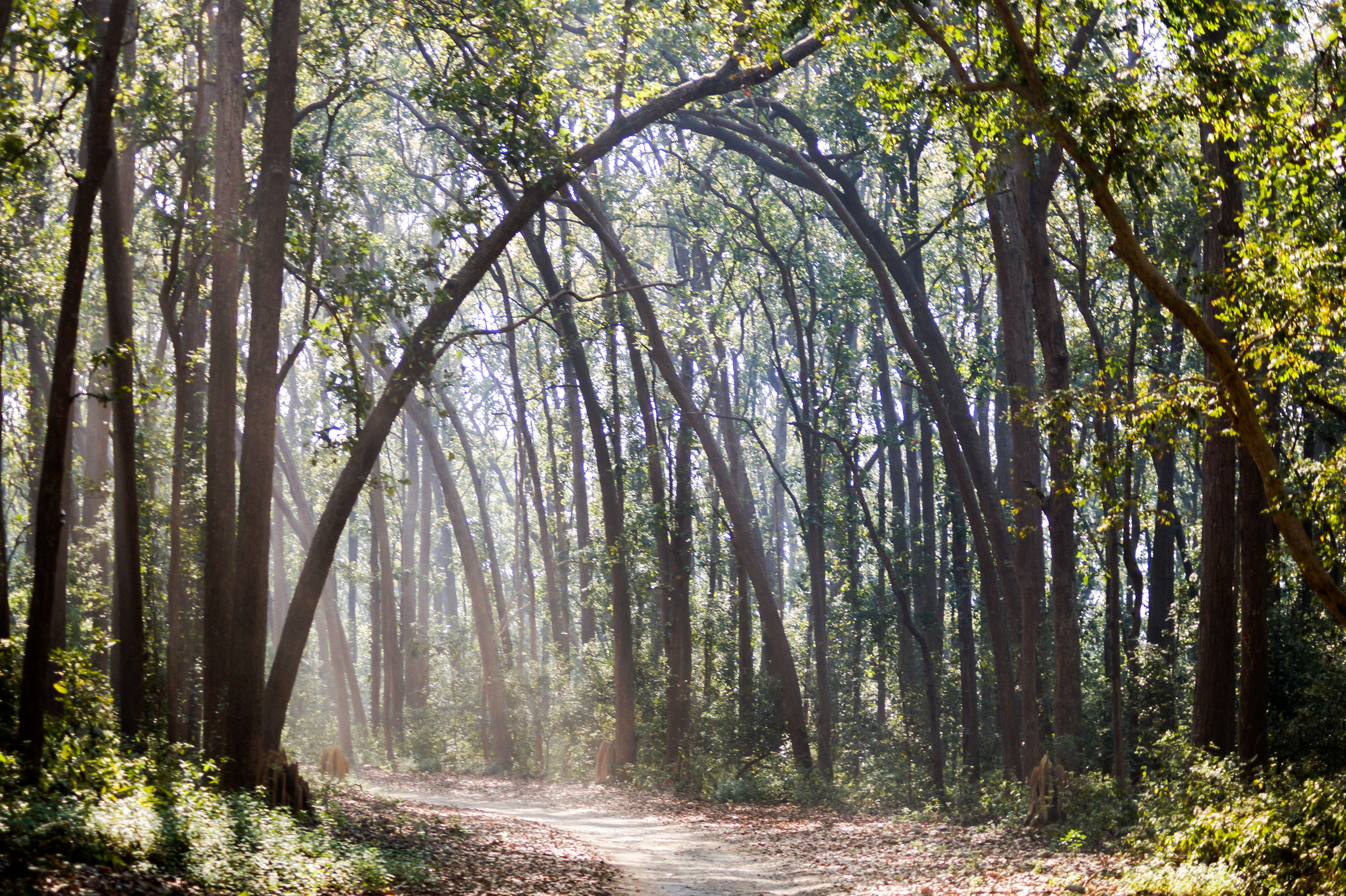
Forest in Jim Corbett National Park

Tree density inside the reserve is higher in the areas of Sal forests and lowest in the Anogeissus–Acacia catechu forests. Total tree basal cover is greater in Sal dominated areas of woody vegetation. Healthy regeneration in sapling and seedling layers is occurring in the Mallotus philippensis, Jamun, and Diospyros spp. communities, but in the Sal forests the regeneration of sapling and seedling is poor. A research survey in the 1970s recorded 488 different plant species; in 2023, 617 species were noted, including 110 tree species. A profile of the reserve compiled by the Wildlife Institute of India, listed the sal tree (Shorea robusta), Adina cordifolia, Anogeissus latifolia, Bauhinia rausinosa, Cassia fistula, and M. philippensis as the notable tree species.

== Fauna ==
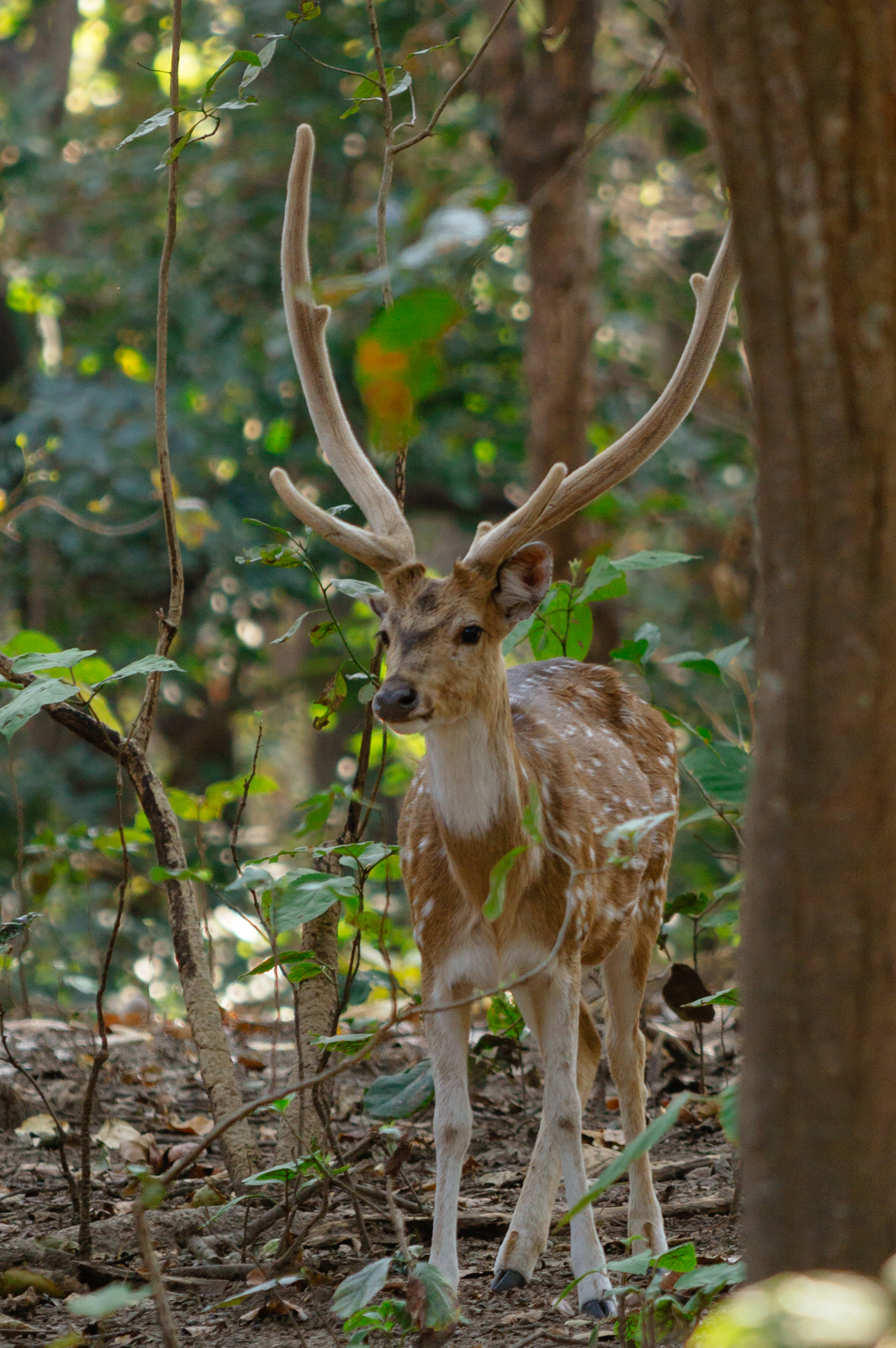
A chital stag in Jim Corbett National Park

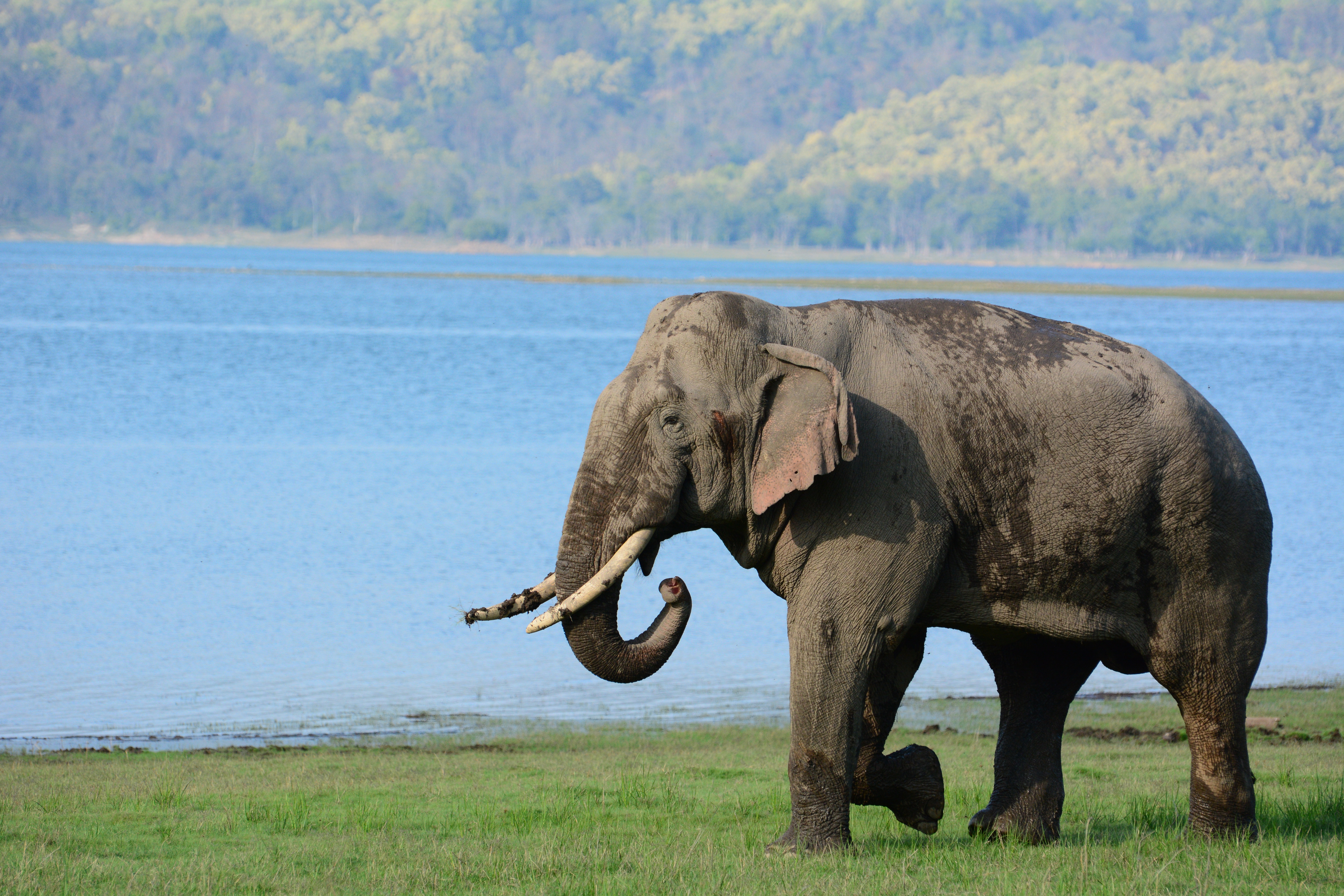
A tusker elephant on the bank of the Ramganga river

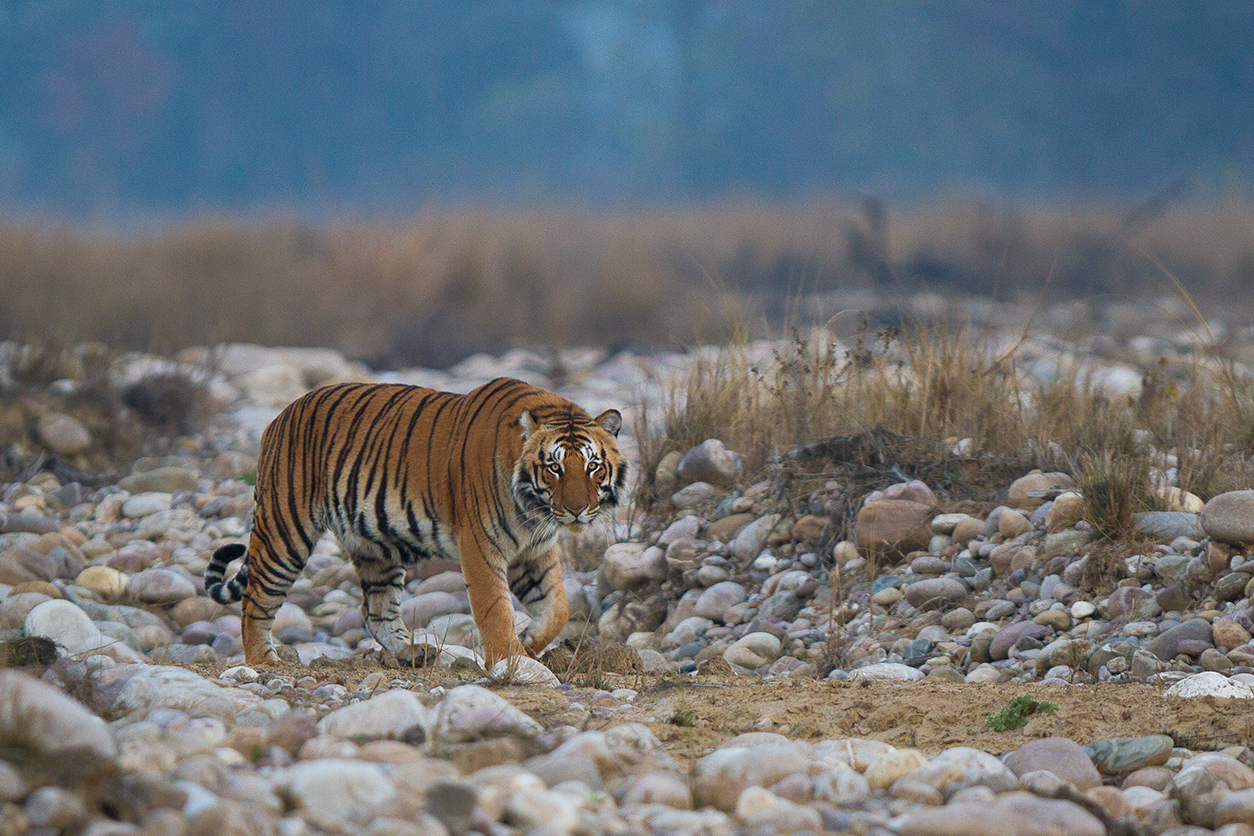
A tiger walking on the river bed

Jim Corbett National Park is home to many wildlife species. Mammals are represented by the Indian elephant, Indian leopard, Bengal tiger, jungle cat, fishing cat, and leopard cat. barking deer, sambar deer, hog deer, chital, sloth bear, Asiatic black bear, Indian gray mongoose, otters, yellow-throated marten, Himalayan goral, Indian pangolin, langur and rhesus macaque. Marsh crocodiles and gharials were released into Ramganga river. Thick jungle, the Ramganga river and plentiful prey make this reserve an ideal habitat for predators. According to the 2022 census, there were 260 tigers in the park. There were around 1100 elephants in the park in 2019. The tigers in the park kill large animals like elephants, especially calves.

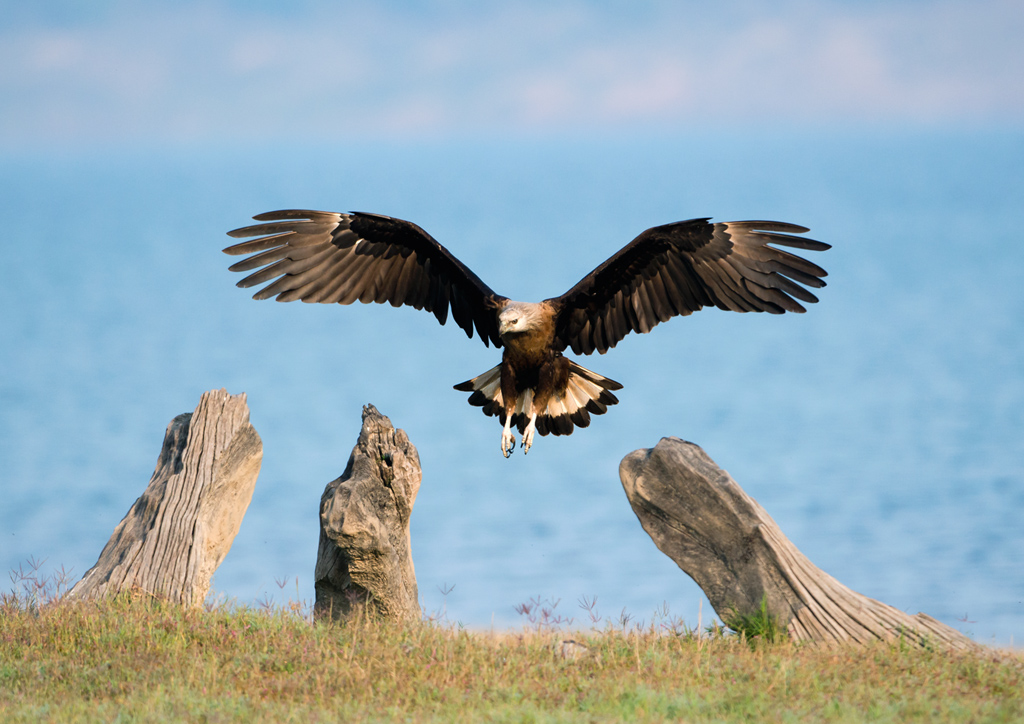
Fish Eagle at Corbett National Park

More than 586 species of resident and migratory birds have been sighted, including the crested serpent eagle, Indian paradise flycatcher, greater coucal, blossom-headed parakeet and the red junglefowl, owls, and nightjars. 33 reptiles species including the Indian python, 7 amphibians species, 7 fish species and 36 dragonflies species have also been recorded.

== Ecotourism ==
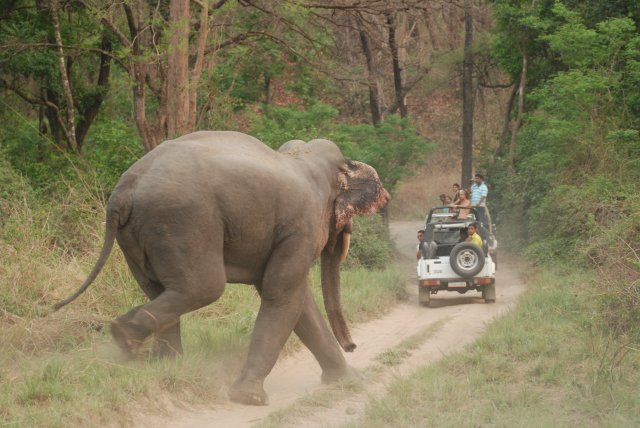
Young Indian elephant bull charging a jeep

Though the main focus is protection of wildlife, the reserve management has also encouraged ecotourism. In 1993, a training course covering natural history, visitor management and park interpretation was introduced to train nature guides. A second course followed in 1995 which recruited more guides for the same purpose. This allowed the staff of the reserve, previously preoccupied with guiding the visitors, to carry out management activities uninterrupted.

The Indian government has organised workshops on ecotourism in Corbett National Park and Garhwal region to ensure that the local citizens profit from tourism while the park remains protected. According to Riley & Riley (2005): "Best chances of seeing a tiger to come late in the dry season- April to mid-June-and go out with mahouts and elephants for several days."

As early as 1991, the Corbett National Park played host to 3237 tourist vehicles carrying 45,215 visitors during the main tourist seasons between 15 November and 15 June. This heavy influx of tourists has led to visible stress signs on the natural ecosystem. Excessive trampling of soil has led to reduction in plant species and resulted in reduced soil moisture. Tourists have increasingly used fuel wood for cooking. This fuel wood is obtained from nearby forests resulting in greater pressure on the ecosystem. Additionally, tourists have also reportedly caused problems by making noise, littering, and causing disturbances in general.

== Other attractions ==
- Dhikala is situated at the fringes of Patli Dun valley. There is a rest house, which was built hundreds of years ago. Kanda ridge forms the backdrop, and from Dhikala, there are views of the valley.
- Kalagarh Dam is located in the south-west of the wildlife sanctuary. Many migratory waterfowl come here in the winters.
- Corbett Falls is a 20 m (66 ft) water fall situated 25 km (16 mi) from Ramnagar, and 4 km (2.5 mi) from Kaladhungi, on the Kaladhungi–Ramnagar highway. The falls are surrounded by dense forests.
- Garjiya Devi Temple is sacred to Garjiya Devi and is mostly visited during the Kartik Purnima (November – December). It is located on the bank of the river Kosi, amidst the hilly terrains of Uttarakhand, nearby Garjiya village, at a distance of 14 km. from Ramnagar, Uttarakhand, India.

== Challenges ==
=== Past ===
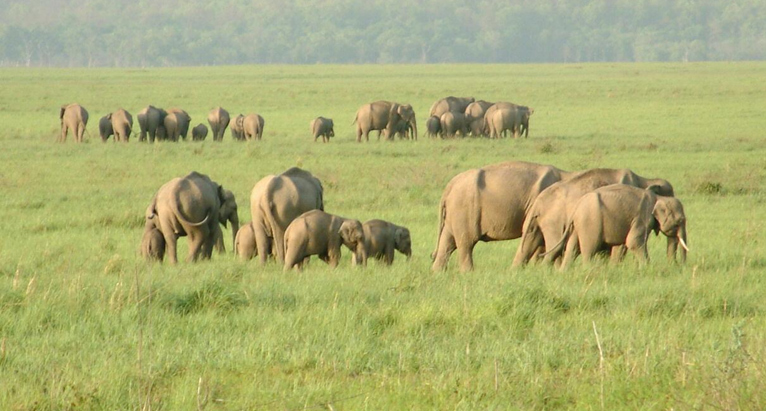
An elephant herd at Jim Corbett National Park

A major incident in the history of the reserve followed the construction of a dam at the Kalagarh river and the submerging of 80 km^{2} (31 sq mi) of prime low lying riverine area. The consequences ranged from local extinction of swamp deer to a massive reduction in hog deer population. The reservoir formed due to the submerging of land has also led to an increase in aquatic fauna and has additionally served as a habitat for winter migrants.

Two villages situated on the southern boundary were shifted to the Firozpur–Manpur area situated on Ramnagar–Kashipur highway during 1990–93; the vacated areas were designated as buffer zones. The families in these villages were mostly dependent on forest products. With the passage of time, these areas began to show signs of ecological recovery. Vines, herbs, grasses and small trees began to appear, followed by herbaceous flora, eventually leading to natural forest type. It was observed that grass began to grow on the vacated agricultural fields and the adjoining forest areas started recuperating. By 1999–2002 several plant species emerged in these buffer zones. The newly arisen lush green fields attracted grass eating animals, mainly deer and elephants, who slowly migrated towards these areas and even remained during the monsoon.

There were 109 cases of poaching recorded in 1988–89. This figure dropped to 12 reported cases in 1997–98.

In 1985, David Hunt, a British ornithologist and birdwatching tour guide, was killed by a tiger in the park.

=== Present ===
The reserve habitat faces threats from invasive species, including Lantana, Parthenium, and Cassia. Natural resources, such as trees and grasses are used by the local population. In addition, encroachment affecting at least 13.62 ha (33.7 acres) by 74 families has been documented.

The villages surrounding the park are at least 15–20 years old and no new villages have come up in the recent past. The increasing population growth rate and the density of population within 1 km (0.62 mi) to 2 km (1.2 mi) from the park present a challenge to the management of the reserve. Incidents of killing cattle by tigers and leopards have led to acts of retaliation by the local population in some cases. The Indian government has approved the construction of a 12 km (7.5 mi) stone masonry wall on the southern boundary of the reserve where it comes in direct contact with agricultural fields.

In April 2008, the National Tiger Conservation Authority (NTCA) expressed serious concern that protection systems have weakened, and poachers have infiltrated into this park. Monitoring of wild animals in the prescribed format has not been followed despite advisories and observations made during field visits. Also, the monthly monitoring report of field evidence relating to tigers has not been received since 2006. NTCA said that in the "absence of ongoing monitoring protocol in a standardised manner, it would be impossible to forecast and keep track of untoward happenings in the area targeted by poachers". A cement road has been built through the park against a Supreme Court order. The road has become a thoroughfare between Kalagarh and Ramnagar. Constantly increasing vehicle traffic on this road is affecting the wildlife of crucial ranges like Jhirna, Kotirau and Dhara. The Kalagarh irrigation colony that takes up about 5 km^{2} (1.9 sq mi) of the park is yet to be vacated despite a 2007 Supreme Court order.

=== Ecosystem valuation ===
An economic assessment study of Jim Corbett Tiger Reserve estimated its annual flow benefits to be ₹14.7 billion (1.14 lakh / hectare). Important ecosystem services included gene-pool protection (₹10.65 billion), provisioning of water to downstream districts of Uttar Pradesh (₹1.61 billion), water purification services to the city of New Delhi (₹550 million), employment for local communities (₹82 million), provision of habitat and refugia for wildlife (₹274 million) and sequestration of carbon (₹214 million).

== In popular culture ==
The 2005 Bollywood movie Kaal has a plot set in the Jim Corbett National Park. The movie was filmed at the park as well.

In August 2019, Prime Minister of India Narendra Modi appeared in a special episode of Discovery Channel's show Man vs Wild with the host Bear Grylls, where he trekked the jungles and talked about nature and wildlife conservation with Grylls. The episode was filmed in Jim Corbett National Park and broadcast in 180 countries along India.

== See also ==
- Leopard of Rudraprayag
- Champawat Tiger
- Rajaji National Park
- Man-Eaters of Kumaon
- Arid Forest Research Institute
- Indian Council of Forestry Research and Education
