= Shahabad, Rampur =

Shahabad
- Town
- Nickname: Sbd
- Location in Uttar Pradesh, India Shahabad (India)
- Coordinates: 28.566°N 79.009°E
- Country: India
- State: Uttar Pradesh
- District: Rampur
- Established: 1 Aug 1887
- Elevation: 143 m (469 ft)

Population (2001)
  - Total: 32,015

Languages
  - Official: Hindi
- Time zone: UTC+5:30 (IST)
- PIN: 244922
- Vehicle registration: UP 22
- Website: up.gov.in

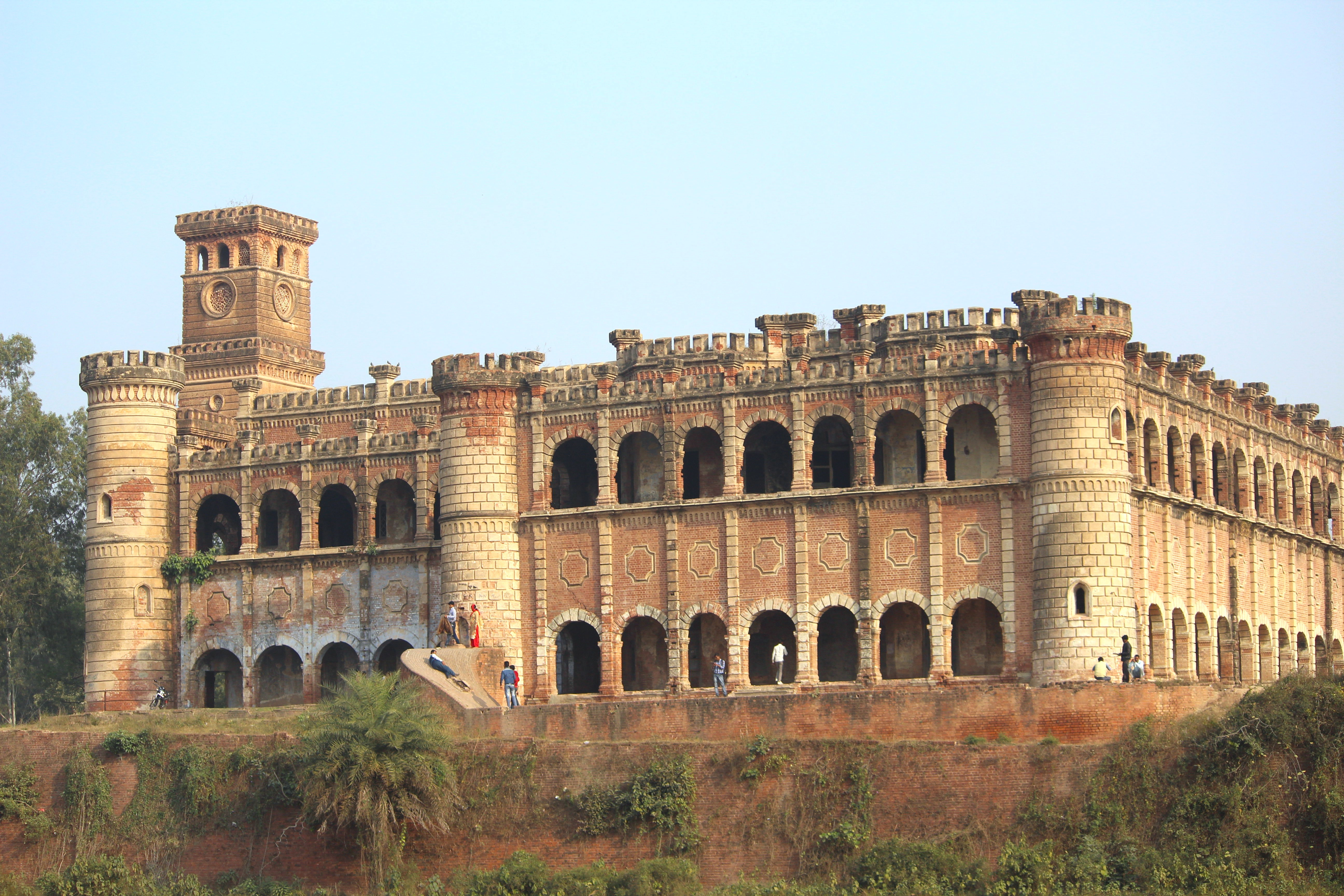
Lakhibagh ki Kothi, Shahabad

Shahabad is a town and a nagar panchayat in Rampur district in the Indian state of Uttar Pradesh. Shahabad is a place of nawabs. Shahabad is made by the very first nawab of rampur Hamid Ali Shah. Shahabad is also famous for its heritage of old palace made by nawab rampur in the 18th century, which is also known as Kothi. Shahabad has mixed population. Mainly Hindus and Muslim. Shahabad has town area. Current Chairman is Mrs. Sumbul Naaz.

== Geography ==
Shahabad is located at 28.566°N 79.009°E. It has an average elevation of 143 metres (469 feet).

== Demographics ==
As of 2001 India census, Shahabad had a population of 32,015. Males constitute 53% of the population and females 47%. Shahabad has an average literacy rate of 31%, lower than the national average of 59.5%: male literacy is 38%, and female literacy is 24%. In Shahabad, 20% of the population is under 6 years of age.
