= Ramnagar, Uttarakhand =

Ramnagar
- Town
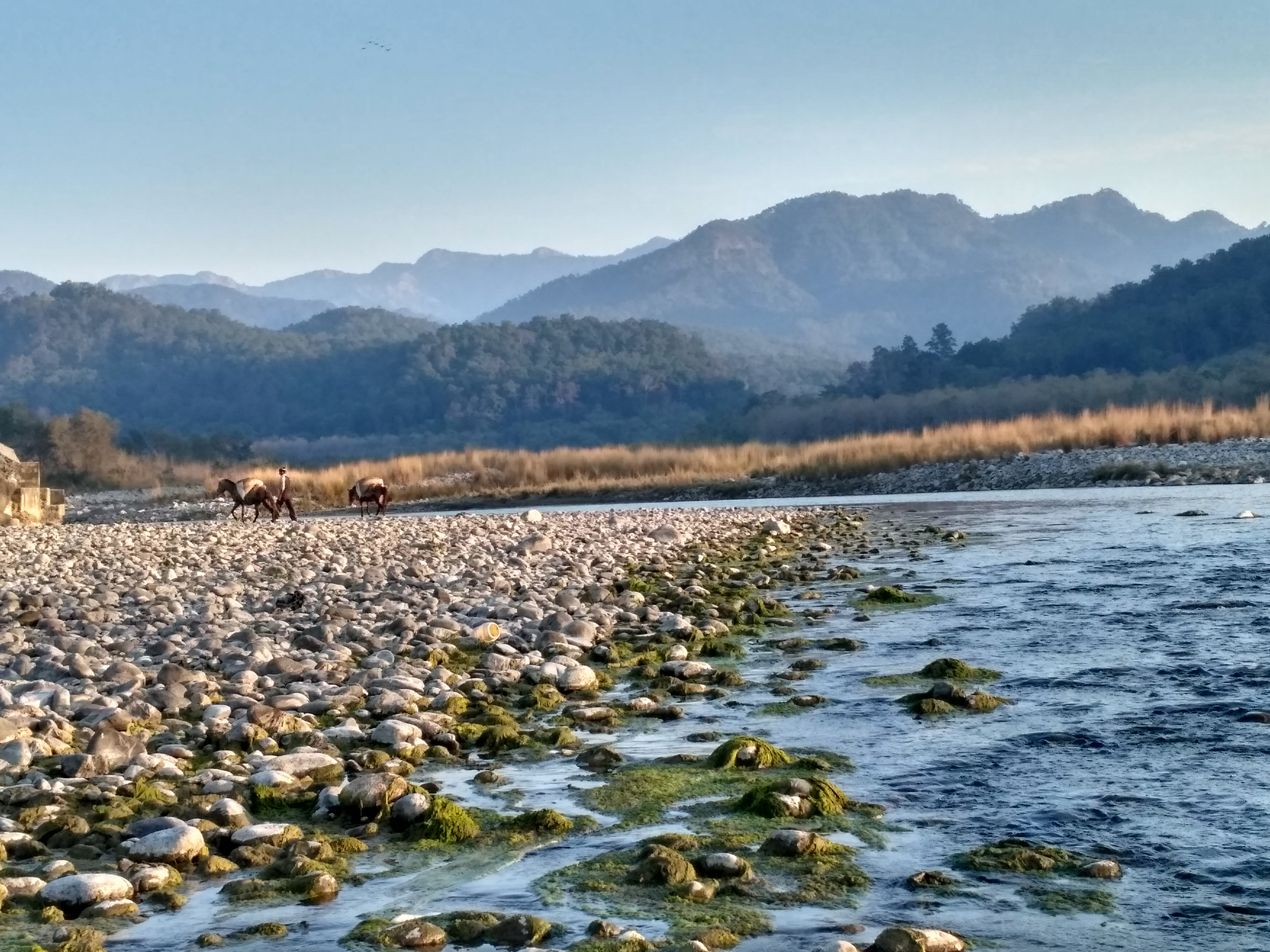
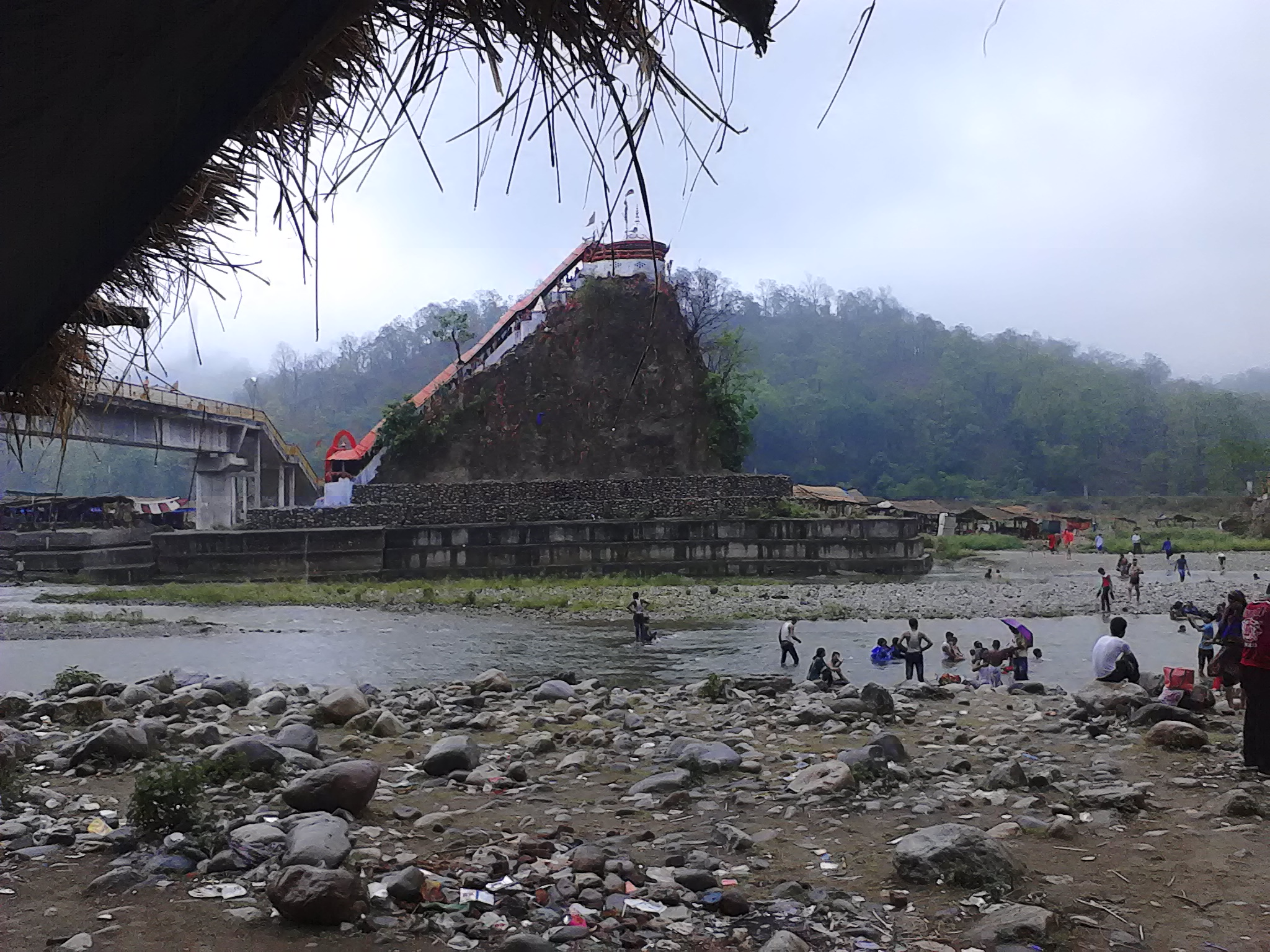
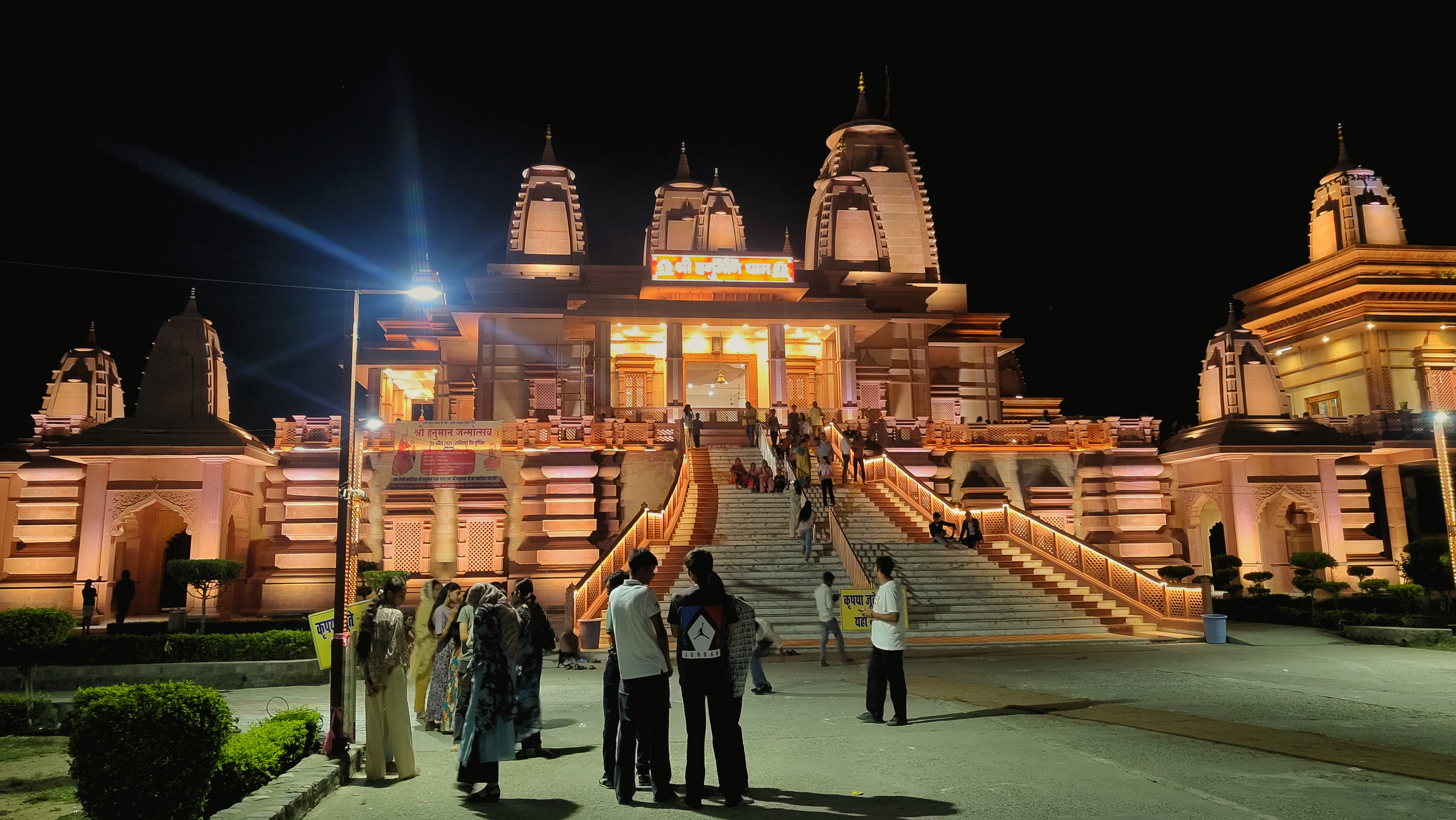
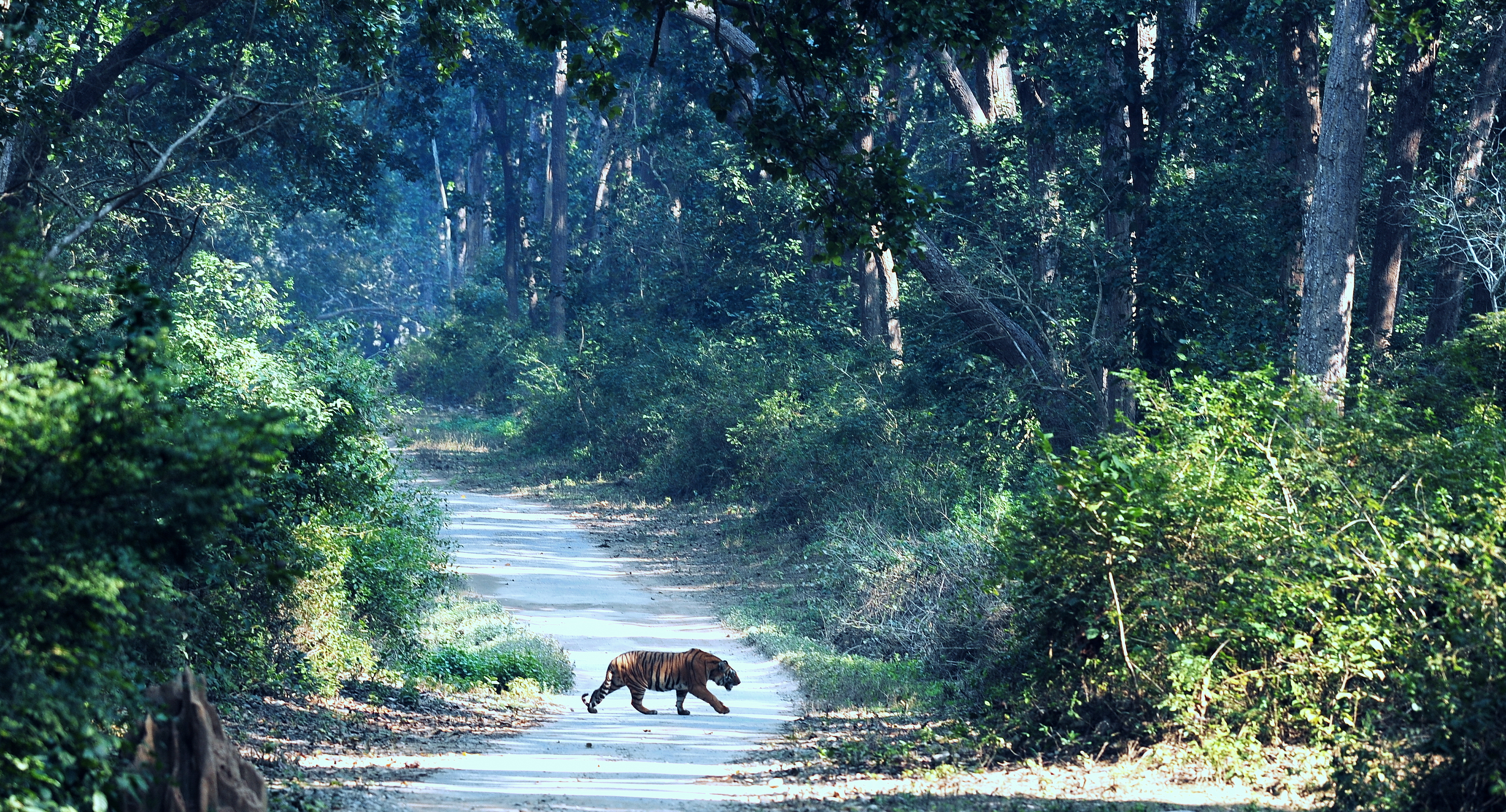
- Kosi river Garjiya Devi Temple Hanuman dham, Chhoi A Bengal Tiger in the Jim Corbett National Park
- Nickname: Corbett City
- Location within Uttarakhand Location within India
- Coordinates: 29°23′42″N 79°07′35″E
- Country: India
- State: Uttarakhand
- Division: Kumaon
- District: Nainital
- Named for: Sir Henry Ramsay
- Elevation: 345 m (1,132 ft)

Population (2011)
  - Total: 97,916

Languages
  - Official: Hindi
  - Native: Buksa; Khariboli; Kumaoni
- Time zone: UTC+5:30 (IST)
- PIN: 244715
- Telephone code: 915947
- Vehicle registration: UK-19

Ramnagar (Kumaoni: Rāmnagar) is a town and municipal board in the Nainital district of Kumaon region in the state of Uttarakhand, India. It is located approximately 65 kilometres (40 mi) from Nainital, the headquarters of the district.

Ramnagar is a gateway to the Corbett National Park, the oldest national park and a famous tourist destination. The Garjiya Devi Temple and Sitabani temple, Sitabani Wildlife Reserve located nearby also attract many visitors.

Uttarakhand Board of School Education is headquartered in Ramnagar. The board was set up in 2001, and is responsible for administering courses of instructions, textbooks, and to conduct examinations for secondary school students of the state.

== Geography ==
Ramnagar is located at 29.40°N 79.12°E.

It has an average elevation of roughly 345 metres (1,132 feet). Ramnagar is located at the foothills of the Himalayas on the bank of river Kosi. The town is visited by many tourists due to its geographical location near Corbett National Park. Its proximity to Nainital which is a famous hill station of Northern India makes it even more popular. There is a Barrage on Kosi River in Ramnagar where many migratory birds such as Ruddy Shelduck arrive in winter.

== Demographics ==
According to the 2011 Indian Census, the town consists of 54,787 people. The state of Uttarakhand has literacy rate of 87.6 percent, which is higher than Nation's average of 74.04 percent.

Total Number of Households: 10,620
Population	Persons	Males	Females
Total	54,787	28,386	26,401
In the age group 0–6 years	7,004	3,730	3,274
Scheduled Castes (SC)	5,068	2,586	2,482
Scheduled Tribes (ST)	54	29	25
Literates	39,067	21,280	17,787
Illiterate	15,720	7,106	8,614
Total Worker	15,890	14,260	1,630
Main Worker	13,955	12,653	1,302
Main Worker - Cultivator	100	97	3
Main Worker - Agricultural Labourers	75	71	4
Main Worker - Household Industries	383	356	27
Main Worker - Other	13,397	12,129	1,268
Marginal Worker	1,935	1,607	328
Marginal Worker - Cultivator	26	17	9
Marginal Worker - Agriculture Labourers	41	33	8
Marginal Worker - Household Industries	63	48	15
Marginal Workers - Other	1,805	1,509	296
Marginal Worker (3-6 Months)	1,712	1,422	290
Marginal Worker - Cultivator (3-6 Months)	25	16	9
Marginal Worker - Agriculture Labourers (3-6 Months)	34	28	6
Marginal Worker - Household Industries (3-6 Months)	53	41	12
Marginal Worker - Other (3-6 Months)	1,600	1,337	263
Marginal Worker (0-3 Months)	223	185	38
Marginal Worker - Cultivator (0-3 Months)	1	1	0
Marginal Worker - Agriculture Labourers (0-3 Months)	7	5	2
Marginal Worker - Household Industries (0-3 Months)	10	7	3
Marginal Worker - Other Workers (0-3 Months)	205	172	33
Non Worker	38,897	14,126	24,771

== History ==
The town is named after British commissioner Sir Henry Ramsay who established it in 1850 during the British rule in India. During the British rule tea gardens were developed in Ramnagar and nearby villages in Uttarakhand. But these tea gardens have been closed for a long time. Ramnagar is most visited for Corbett National Park named after the hunter turned conservationist Jim Corbett who helped establish the village. It is the oldest national park in India which was established in 1936. Ancient temples like Garjia Devi Temple and Sita Bani Temple draw many visitors every year.

== Visitor attractions ==
=== Corbett National Park ===
Sambar deer in Jim Corbett National Park

Corbett National Park is 10 km from Ramnagar. It is spread across 86 km north of Ramnagar. Established in 1936 as the Hailey National Park, Corbett National Park is the oldest and one of the most sought after national parks in India. It is India's first sanctuary to come under Project Tiger. The park was named after the hunter-naturalist turned author and photographer, Jim Corbett who lived in the region and contributed in setting up this park. Visitors can move about in vehicles (only local gypsies with the permit) inside the park area after making entries at the respective gates. Tourists now cannot drive their own cars inside Corbett. They have to hire gypsies with permits from Ramnagar. Permits are necessary for entering Corbett Tiger Reserve. Permits are issued at the CTR Reception Office in Ramnagar. Other places worth visiting in the region are the Crocodile Pool, Dhikala Machaan, Getheryo Library (Dhikala), Corbett Museum (Dhangadi gate), Corbett falls.

=== Garjiya Devi Temple ===
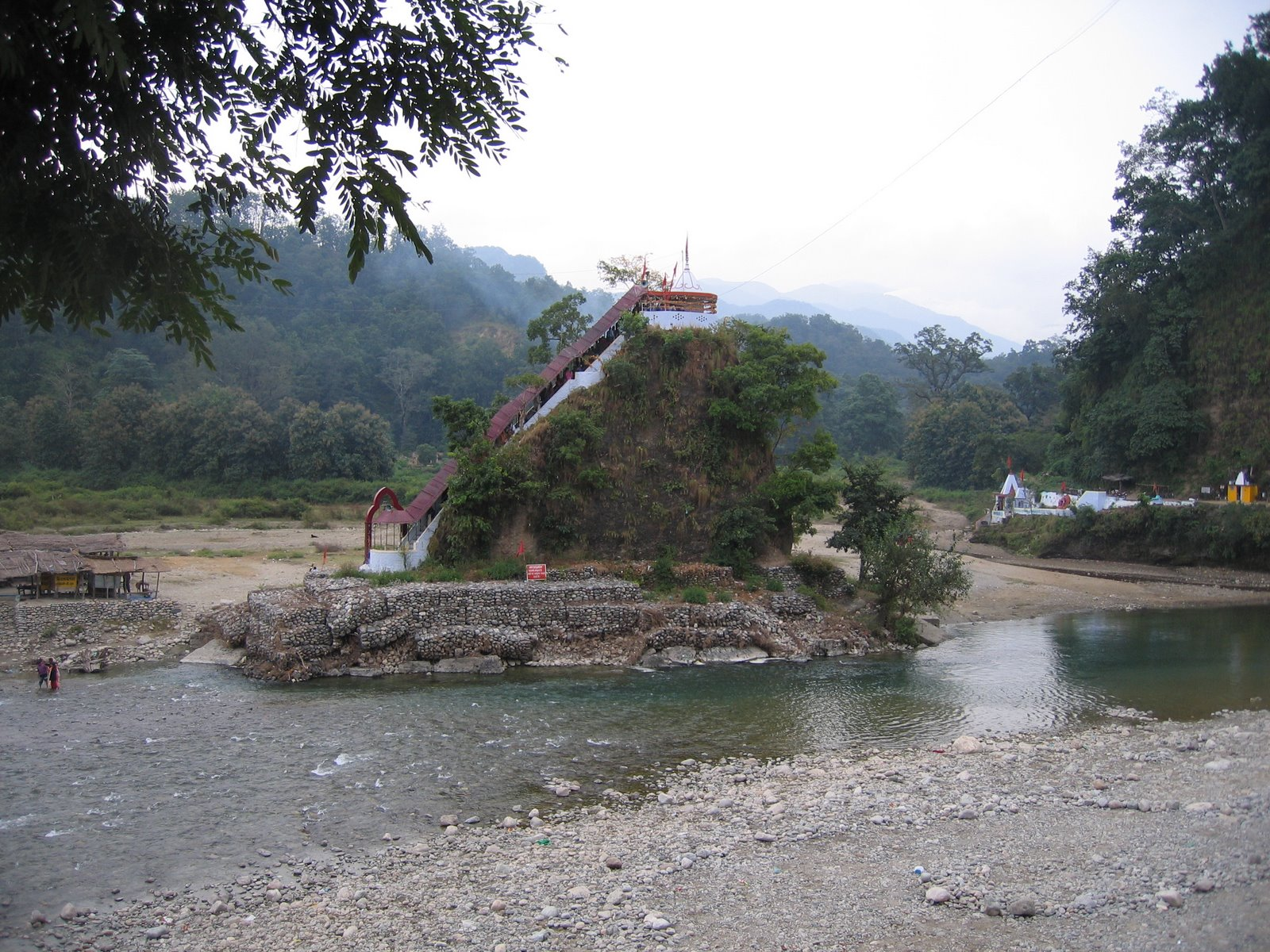
Garjiya Devi Temple on the Kosi

Garjiya Devi Temple is located in the Garjiya village near Ramnagar, Uttarakhand, India. It is a sacred Shakti shrine where Garjiya Devi is the presiding deity. The temple is situated over a large rock in the Kosi River and is one of the most famous temples of the Nainital district visited by thousands of devotees during Kartik Poornima, a Hindu holy day celebrated on the fifteenth lunar day of Kartik (November – December). It is also known as the festival of lights of the gods.[1] The Kartik Purnima festival also coincides with the Sikh festival of Guru Nanak Jayanti.

=== Sita Bani Temple ===
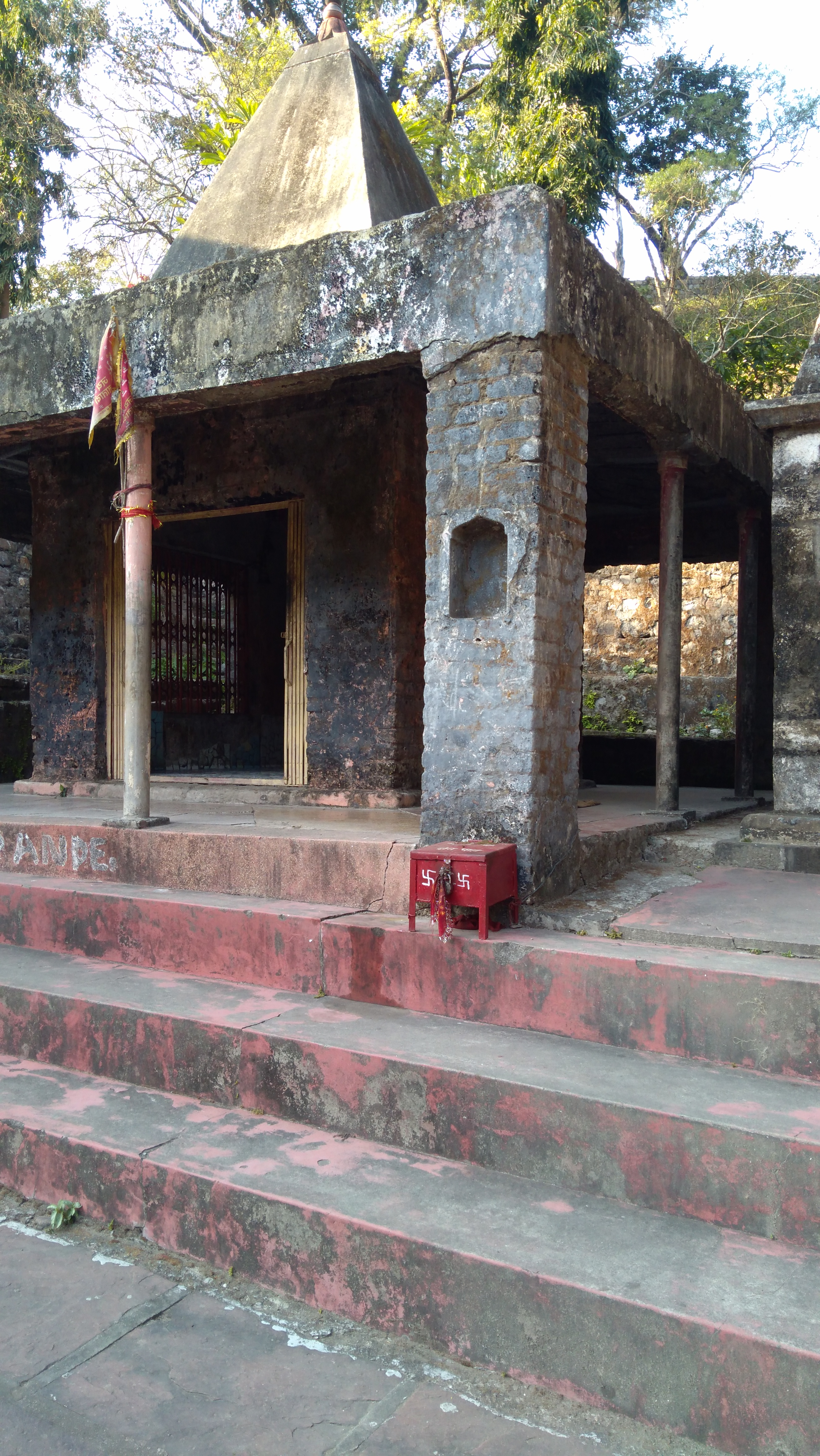

Sita Bani Temple is dedicated to Devi Sita, consort of Lord Rama. It is believed that she entered into the lap of Mother Earth here. Every year, a fair is held here during Ramanavami. It is located at a distance of 20 km from Ramnagar.

=== Tumaria Dam ===
The Tumaria Dam is located about 17 km from Ramnagar in Maldhan village on Kosi river bank and is a major tourist attraction.

== Demographics ==
Hinduism is the majority religion in Ramnagar with 55.91% followers. Islam is second most popular religion in city with 42.92% following it. In Ramnagar, Christianity is followed by 0.35% and Sikhism by 0.73%.

Religion in Ramnagar (2011)
Hinduism	55.91%
Islam	42.92%
Sikhism	0.73%
Christianity	0.35%
Others (incl.unclassified and religion not stated)	0.1%

== Cuisine ==
The local Kumaoni food includes Bhatt ki Churkani, Jholi-Bhat, Gaahat ke Dubke, Channe ke Dubke, Ras-Bhat, Manduwe ki Roti, Paalak ka Kaapa, Bhang ki Chutni, singhodi, Aloo Ke Gutke, Thechwani, Bal Mithai, Singal, Bichoo Saag.

=== Accommodation ===
Ramnagar is also popular for having so many resorts for the tourists to accommodate. More than 100 resorts are located here.

== Transportation ==
=== Air ===
The nearest airport is Pantnagar Airport, 81.6 km away via UT SH 41 and 77.3 km away via NH 87 in the town of Pantnagar in Udham Singh Nagar district. However Indira Gandhi International Airport at Delhi is the nearest international airport which is 255 km away.

Another major airport from Ramnagar is Bareilly Airport which is located around 145 km and connected to cities like Mumbai, New Delhi and Bengaluru.

=== Rail ===
In 1907, during the British Raj the railway line in Uttarakhand was extended from Moradabad to Ramnagar. Ramnagar railway station is under the administrative control of the Izzatnagar division of the North Eastern Railway zone of the Indian Railways. The station is located about 65 km from Nainital. It has direct rail links to Kashipur, Moradabad, Delhi, Bareilly, Lucknow, Haridwar, Chandigarh, Gurgaon, Mumbai, Agra, Jaisalmer and Varanasi. Code of Ramnagar railway station is RMR.

=== Road ===
Ramnagar bus station is located near to the Railway station. There are regular buses from Ramnagar to Nainital, Ranikhet, Haldwani, Tanakpur, Haridwar, Dehradun, Kashipur, Moradabad, Meerut and Delhi. Bus services are also available to Jaipur. National Highway 121 which starts from Kashipur and ends at Bubakhal, Uttarakhand passes through Ramnagar.
