= National Highway 309 (India) =

National highway in India

National Highway 309
- Map of National Highway 309 in red

Route information
- Length: 264 km (164 mi)

Major junctions
- South end: Kashipur
- North end: Bubakhal

Location
- Country: India
- States: Uttarakhand

Highway system
- Roads in India; Expressways; National; State; Asian
← NH 74	→ NH 119

National Highway 309, commonly referred to as NH 309, is a highway connecting the city of Kashipur in Uttarakhand to Bubakhal in Uttarakhand.
