= Khairna =

- town
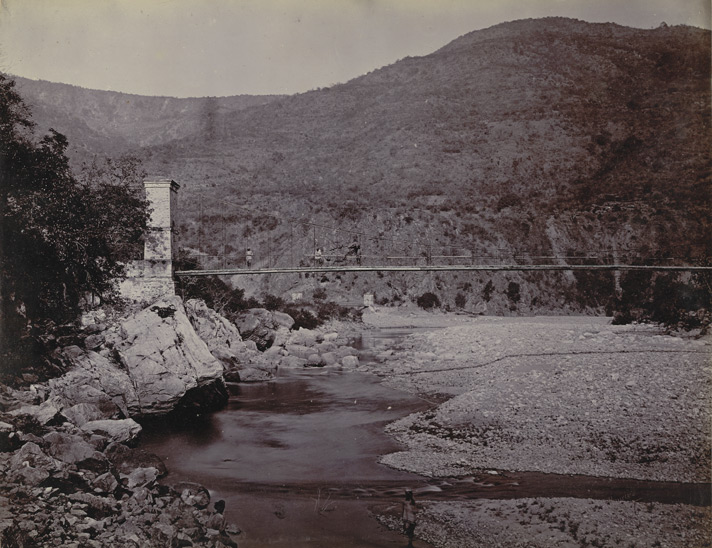
- Khairna Bridge, 1895

- Location in Uttarakhand, India Khairna (India)
- Country: India
- State: Uttarakhand
- District: Nainital

Languages
  - Official: Hindi
- Time zone: UTC+5:30 (IST)
- PIN: 263135
- Vehicle registration: UK 04
- Website: uk.gov.in

Khairna, also spelled Khyrna, is a small hamlet in the Nainital district of the Indian state of Uttarakhand which grew up around the bridge of the same name which has linked two sides of the Kosi River at this site since the Colonial Era.

The Bridge was created in late nineteenth century, when The British Government decided to create a new road along the Khairna river to directly connect the cantonment town of Ranikhet to Nainital the then summer capital of United Provinces. Several shops were established in further years by individuals giving the area the name Khairna Market.

== Geography ==
Khairna is located on the confluence of Kosi and Khairna Rivers, around the Khairna Bridge at 29.496571°N 79.480985°E. It is located at a distance of 30 km from Nainital and Ranikhet. The Khairna Bridge marks the junction of the National Highway 109 with the Bhowali-Ranikhet Road. The river bed at Khairna is abundant in ironstone and quartzite.

== Education ==
The pattern of primary education is essentially the same all over the state. There are government owned schools and government aided schools, which are affiliated to the Uttarakhand Board of School Education. A few privately owned schools are also affiliated to the system. The state education board offers both Hindi and English medium instruction.

The general pattern of education is ten years of common schooling to reach the secondary level. After the secondary level, three streams, namely Arts, Commerce or Science are offered for higher secondary education. After finishing the school, students can opt for higher education related to the streams they had undergone for higher secondary schooling. Approximately 400 students study in the Government Inter College located in Khairna.
