= Naina Devi Himalayan Bird Conservation Reserve =

- Naina Devi Bird Reserve
- IUCN category IV (habitat/species management area)
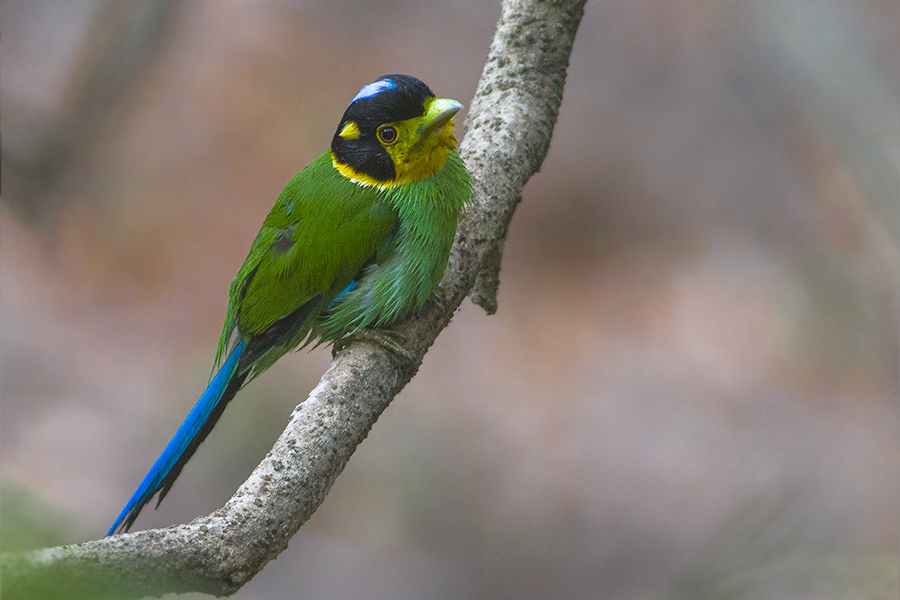
- A Long-tailed broadbill photographed in the reserve

- Location within Uttarakhand
- Location: Nainital district, Uttarakhand, India
- Nearest city: Nainital
- Coordinates: 29°22′47.9994″N 79°27′0″E
- Area: 111.9 km^{2} (43.2 sq mi)
- Elevation: 1,000–2,600 m (3,281–8,530 ft)
- Designation: Conservation Reserve
- Established: May 2015
- Governing body: Government of Uttarakhand, Uttarakhand Forest Department
- Operator: Uttarakhand Forest Department
- Administrator: Nainital Forest Division
- Website: www.nainitalzoo.org.in

Naina Devi Himalayan Bird Conservation Reserve (Devanagari: नैना देवी हिमालयन बर्ड कोन्सेर्वसोन रिज़र्व ) is a wildlife reserve in the Nainital district of the state of Uttarakhand in India. This reserve forest is located in Kumaon region of Uttarakhand and placed inside Nainital forest division. Nainital forest division at present has several birding trails and forest patches consisting of temperate broad-leaf forests to alpine grasslands to rhododendron shrubberies. Wide altitudinal variation supports a very large segment of avian fauna to inhibit in this forest range.

== Geography ==
The total notified area under this reserve is 111.9 km^{2}. Few small hamlets are there inside and around the periphery of this sanctuary; which are namely Barapathar, Kilbury (Pangot), Vinayak etc. Several riverine tributaries are flowing through this forest patch and later they discharge in Ramganga. These riverine tributaries flowing from north enriches its biodiversity.

== Biodiversity ==
This sanctuary falls at the junction of Palearctic realm and Indomalayan realm, supporting a large variety of mammalian and avian fauna.

== Natural history ==
=== Biomes ===
Inside this wildlife sanctuary, the primary ecoregions are:

- Himalayan subtropical broadleaf forests of the tropical and subtropical moist broadleaf forests biome,
- Himalayan subtropical pine forests of the tropical and subtropical coniferous forests biome,
- Western Himalayan subalpine conifer forests of the temperate coniferous forests biome, and
- Western Himalayan alpine shrub and meadows of the montane grasslands and shrublands biome.

All of these are typical of the Nepal - India hilly region. Forest types here include sub-alpine rhododendron forest, fir-oak forest and broad-leaved evergreen forest. It is also noted for harbouring five different species of oak trees.

=== Fauna ===
Birds at Naina Devi Himalayan Bird Conservation Reserve include species like the hill partridge, chukar partridge, koklass pheasant, kalij pheasant, goldcrest, rufous sibia, red-billed leiothrix, black-chinned babbler, chestnut-bellied nuthatch, black-throated tit, rock bunting, green-tailed sunbird and yellow-breasted greenfinch. Some endangered birds like the bearded vulture and Himalayan griffon can also be seen here.

Mammals, which are regularly sighted in this sanctuary are barking deer, yellow-throated marten, stoat, mountain weasel, yellow-bellied weasel. Beside these, Himalayan goral and some types of pika are also present at higher altitudes. Some very commonly seen mammals in this wildlife sanctuary are several types of bats and Royle's pika of the family Ochotonidae.

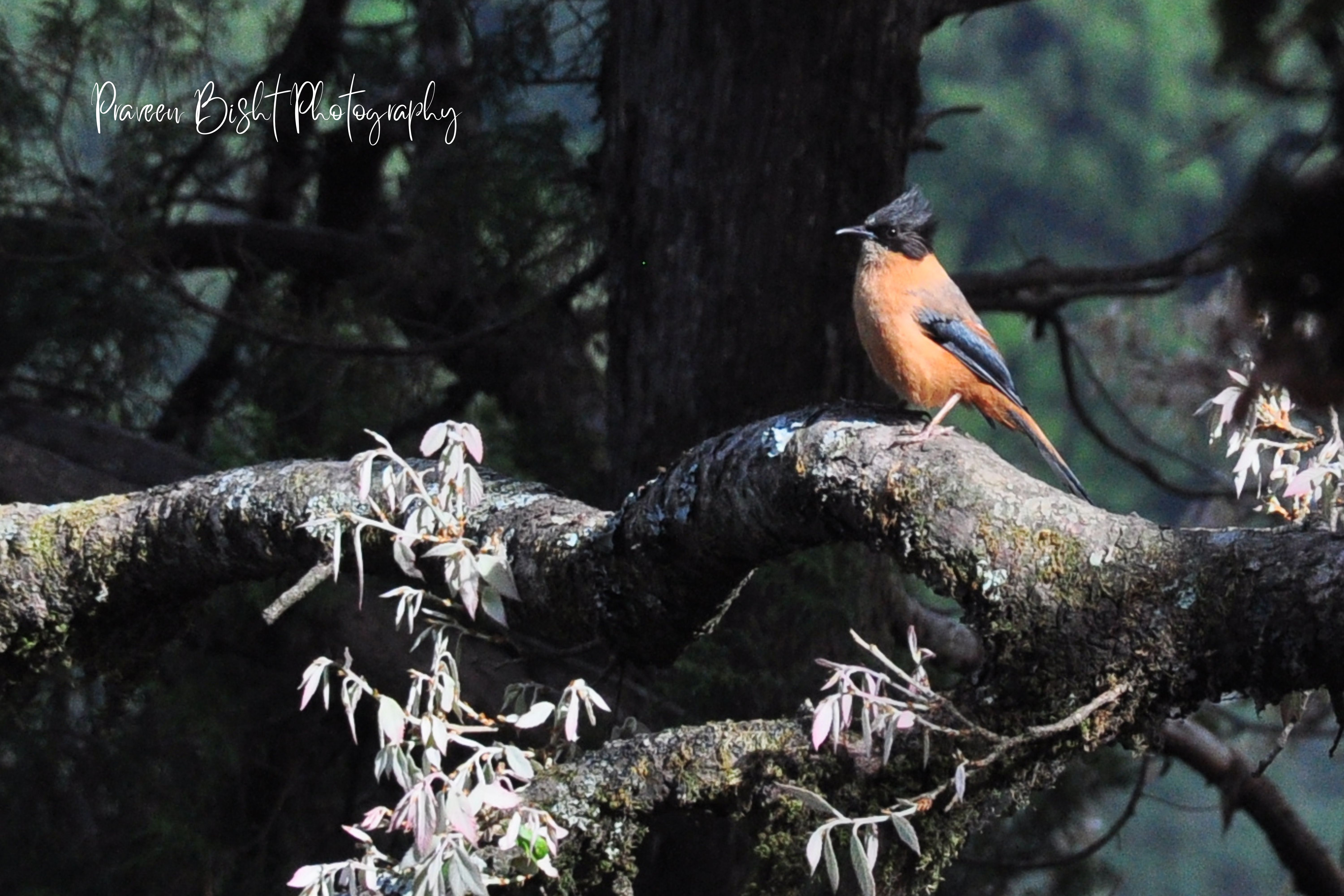
Rufous sibia bird Spotted at Naina Peak Hiking Forest Rufous sibia

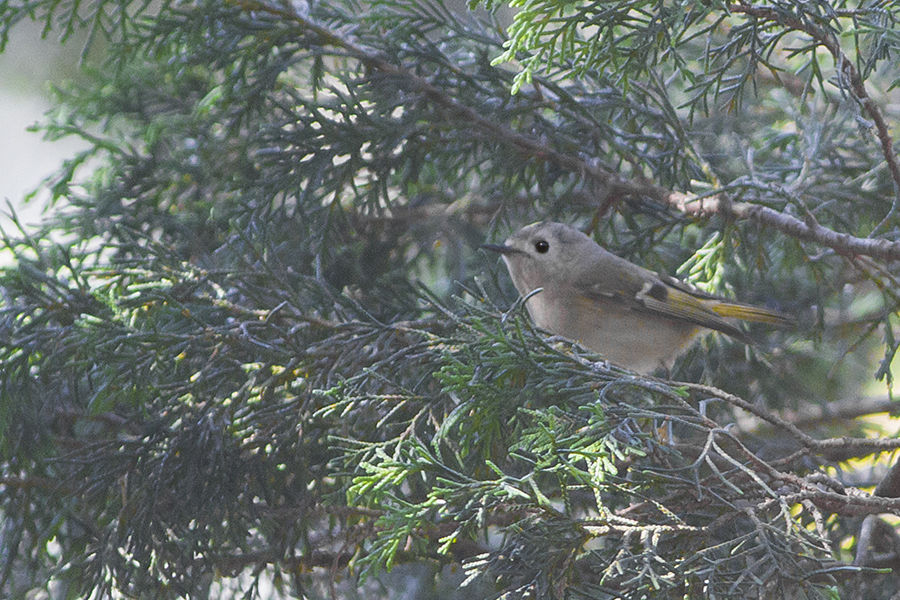
Goldcrest (Regulus regulus himalayensis)

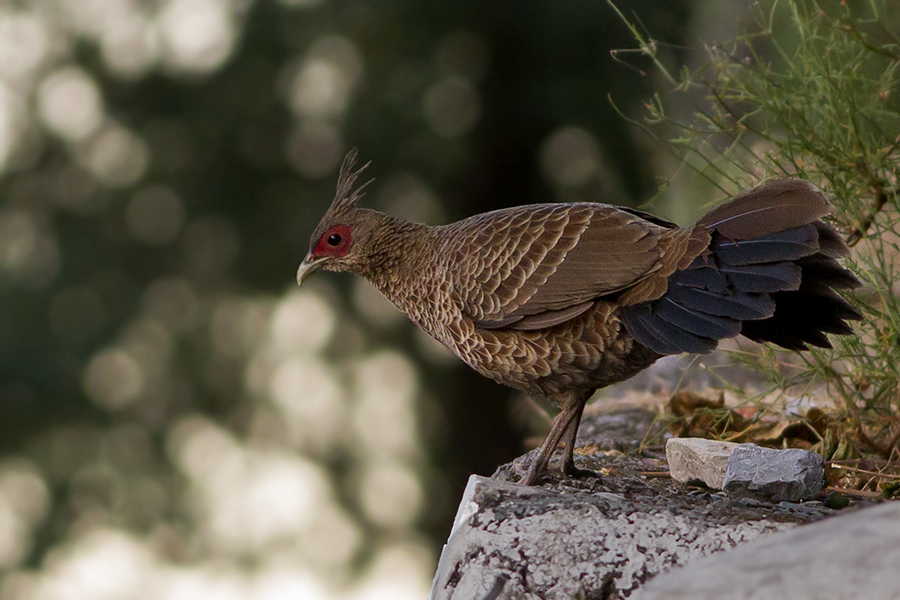
Kalij pheasant (Lophura leucomelanos hamilton)

== See also ==
- Naina Devi Wildlife Sanctuary
