= Jeolikot =

Jeolikote
- Location in Uttarakhand, India Jeolikote (India)
- Coordinates: 29°20′0″N 79°20′0″E
- Country: India
- State: Uttarakhand
- District: Nainital
- Elevation: 1,219 m (3,999 ft)
- Pin Code: 263127
- Language: Kumaoni, Hindi, English

Jeolikote is a hill station in the Nainital district of the state of Uttarakhand, India. It is situated at an altitude of 1,219 meters, 18 km before Nainital on the NH-109. It is also known as the gateway to Naini Lake. It is an ideal place for those who are interested in floral culture and butterfly catching.

It acts as a pit stop for not only the tourists en route to Nainital, but also for the daily commuters who travel back and forth between Haldwani and Nainital.

== Overview ==
In the pre-independence era, it used to be a halt point for the British to acclimatize before moving to the summer capital Nainital. There are many old British structures in Jeolikot. Due to its moderate climate, this place is very fertile for vegetables and fruit. The Centre for Horticulture and Food Processing was established here in 1938, and it continues to train farmers in Honey Beekeeping and mushroom farming. The Forest Research Centre at Jeolikote has established a "Butterfly Trail" in 2022, to preserve several varieties of butterflies unique to the region.

In 2018, the Government of Uttarakhand announced the opening of first Himalayan honey testing lab at Jeolikot. In 2021, an arboretum known as "Shivalik Arboretum" was opened at Jeolikot, showcasing some 200 species of floral diversity of Shivalik hills.

== See also ==
- Pangot
