= Pangot =

Pangot Pangoot
- village
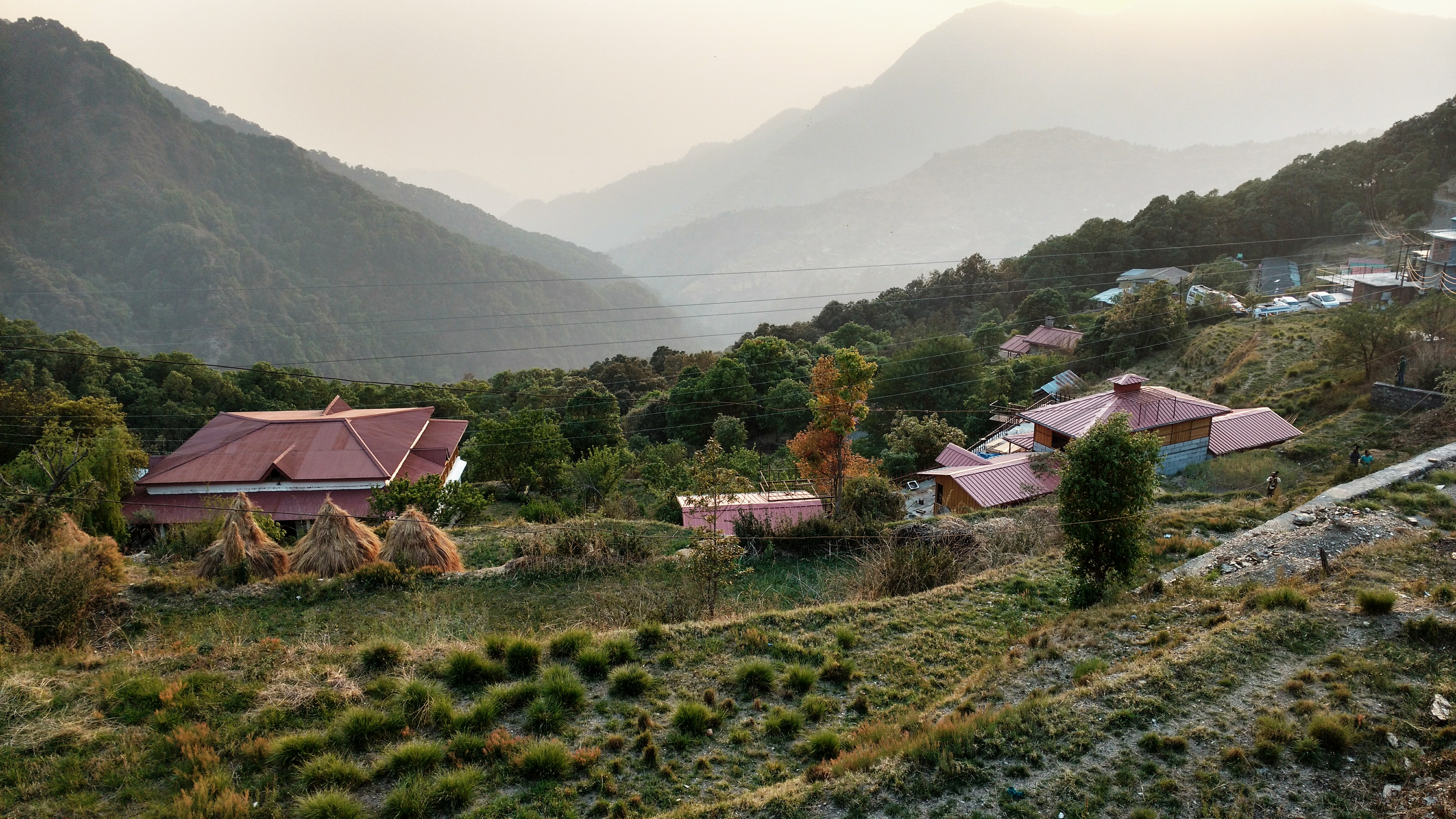
- Pangot in 2017

- Location within Uttarakhand Location within India
- Coordinates: 29°25′25″N 79°25′37″E
- Country: India
- State: Uttarakhand
- District: Nainital
- Tehsil: Kosiyakutoli
- Elevation: 1,980 m (6,510 ft)
- Time zone: UTC+5:30 (IST)
- ISO 3166 code: IN-UT
- Website: uk.gov.in

Pangot is a village in the Kosiyakutoli tehsil of Nainital district in Uttarakhand, India at a height of 6,510 feet. Situated at a distance of 13 km from Nainital, it is a noted Birdwatching site in the Himalayas, as the Pangot & Kilbury Bird Sanctuary part of the Naina Devi Himalayan Bird Conservation Reserve is within 10 km. It has over 250 recorded Bird species, including, Himalayan griffon (Himalayan vulture) and Cheer pheasant.

== Tourism ==
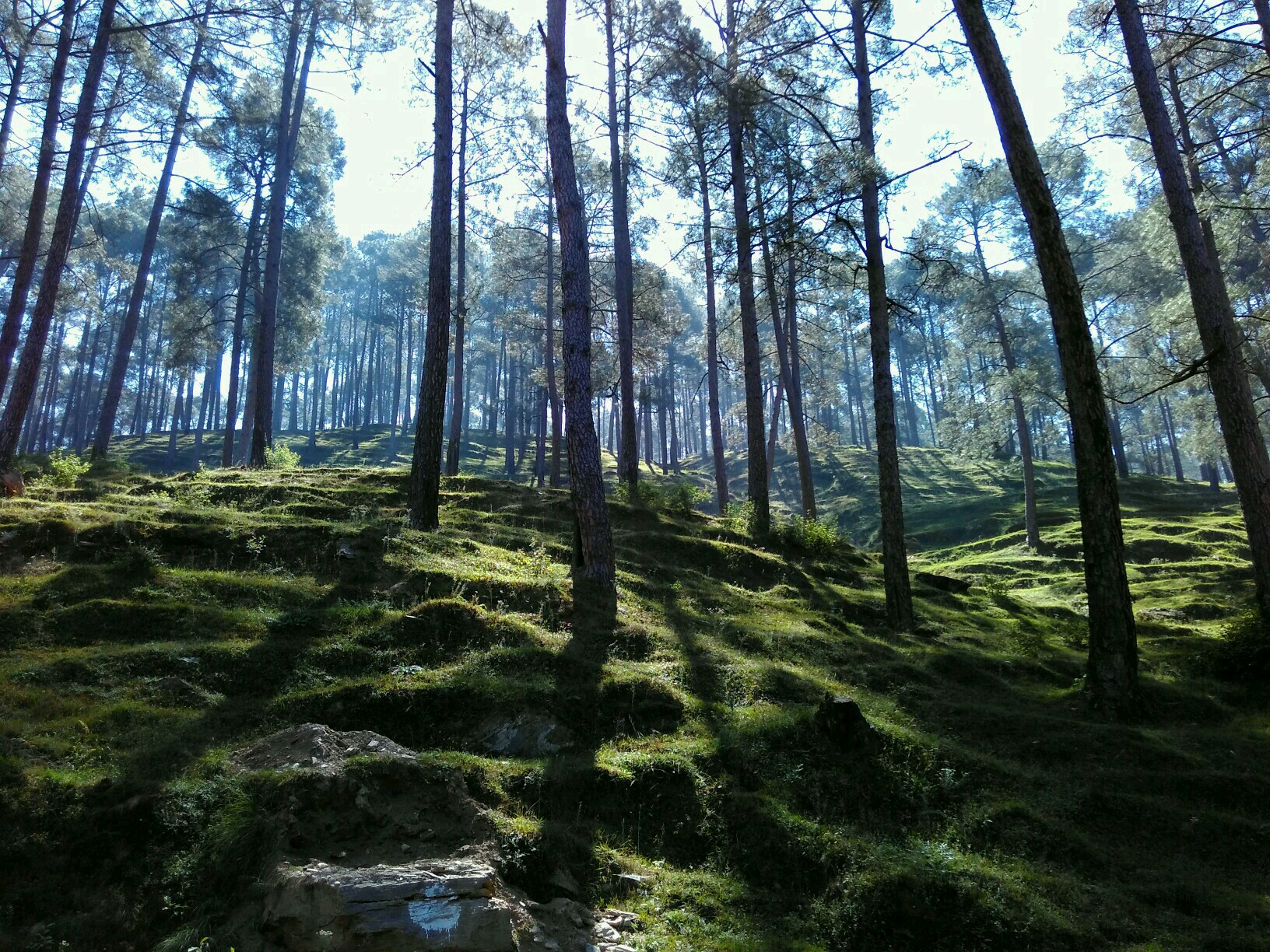
Pangot-The Bird Watcher's attraction, 2016

Pangot Village is located about 13 kilometers from Nainital, which is a popular hill station.

The main attraction of Pangot is its birds; around 580 bird species have been recorded in the area around the village.

During summer (March–July), temperatures can range from 25 °C in the afternoon to 12 °C at night. In the winter (December–January), temperatures range from 18 °C in the afternoon to 8 °C at night.

== Gallery ==
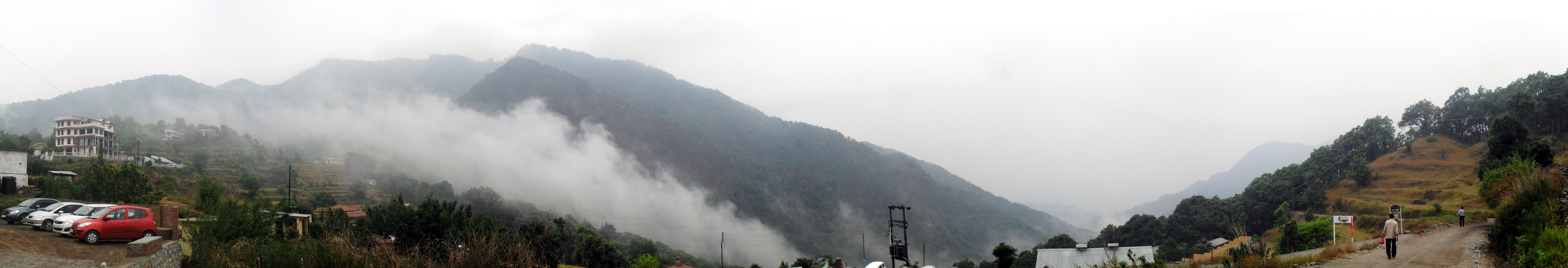
A panorama from Pangot

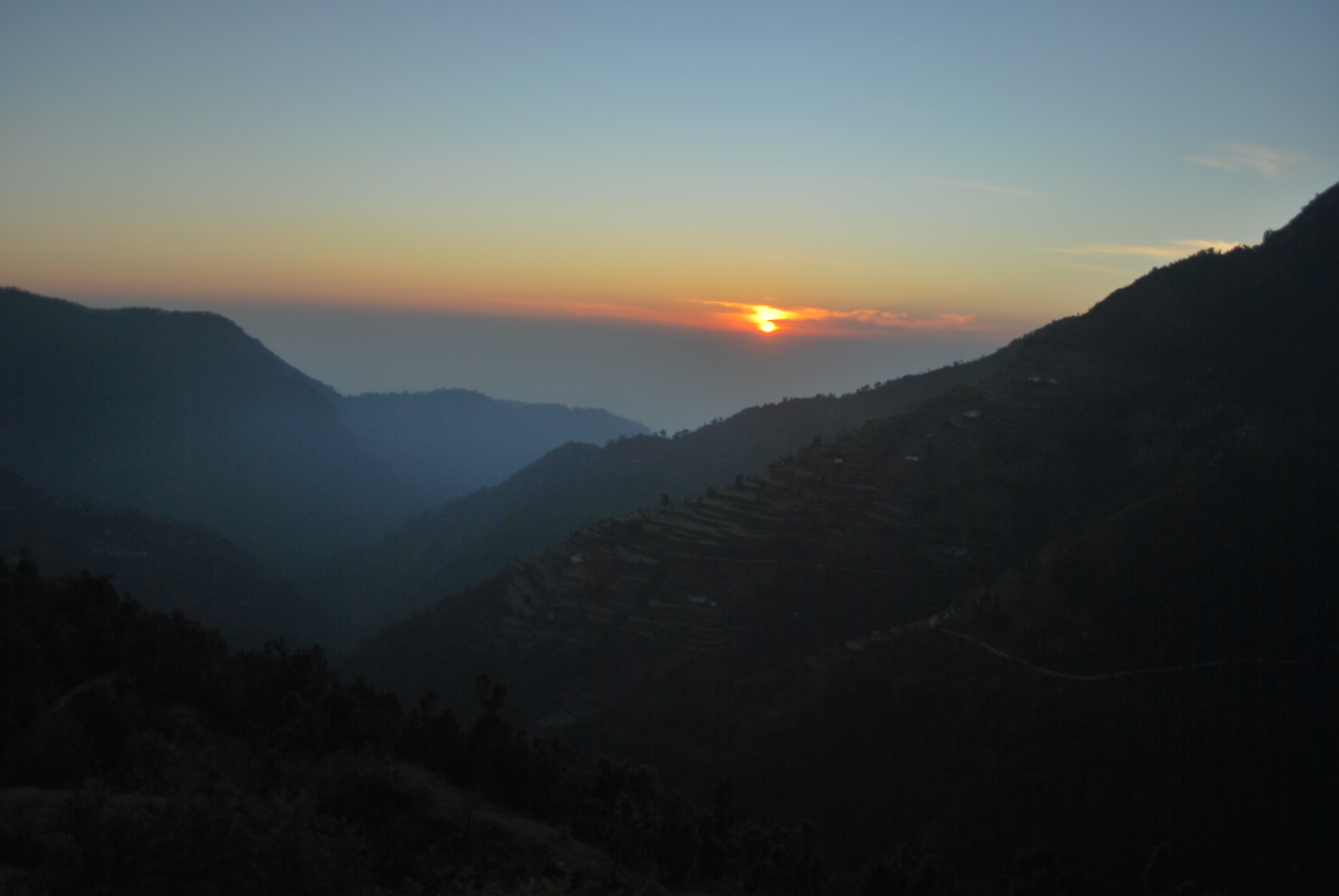
Sunset View Pangot

== See also ==
- Naina Devi Himalayan Bird Conservation Reserve
- Corbett National Park
- Jeolikot
