= Jama Masjid, Nainital =

Mosque in Nainital, Uttarakhand, India

Nainital Mosque
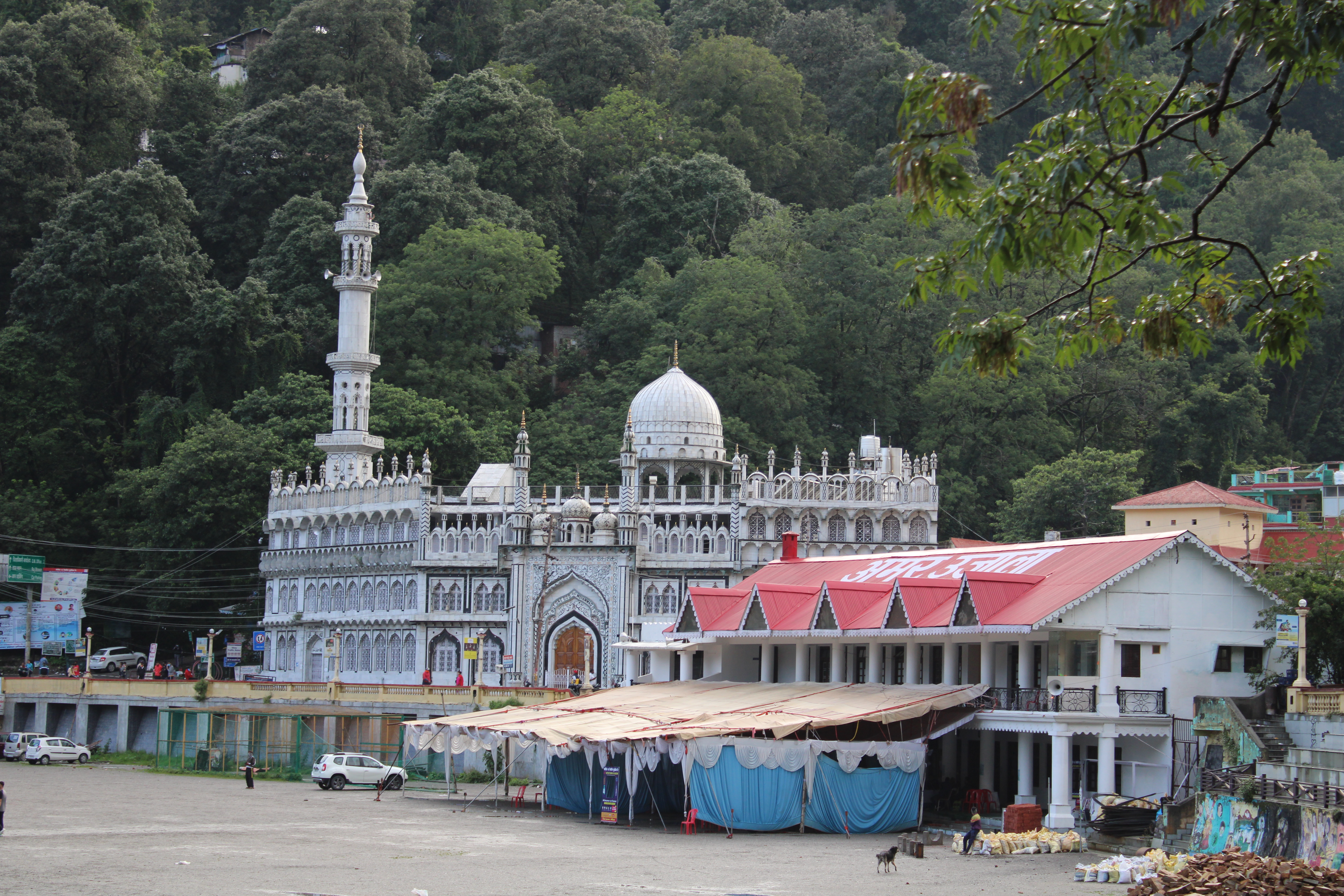
- Entry gate to the mosque

- Location of the mosque in Uttarakhand

Religion
- Affiliation: Islam
- Ecclesiastical or organizational status: Friday mosque
- Status: Active

Location
- Location: Nainital, Kumaon division, Uttarakhand
- Country: India
- Interactive map of Nainital Mosque
- Coordinates: 29°23′28″N 79°27′12″E

Architecture
- Type: Mosque architecture
- Founder: British Raj
- Established: 1865
- Completed: 1882 (1st structure); 1902 (renovations); 1997 (renovations); 2005 (rebuild)

Specifications
- Capacity: 1,100 worshippers
- Length: 24 m (80 ft)
- Width: 37 m (120 ft)
- Interior area: 548.9 m^{2} (5,908 sq ft)
- Height (max): 21 m (69 ft)
- Dome: One (maybe more)
- Minaret: Two
- Minaret height: 21 m (68 ft)
- Site area: 3,592 m^{2} (38,660 sq ft)

The Jama Masjid Nainital is a Friday mosque, located in Nainital, in the Kumaon division of the state of Uttarakhand, India. The mosque was built in 1882 for Muslim soldiers in the British Indian Army. Arabic inscriptions can be seen at the main entrance. It was rebuilt in during 2004 and 2005.

== Background ==
Construction of the Nainital Jama Masjid commenced in 1865 during the British Indian era. Historian Professor Ajay Rawat has claimed that the mosque is from the British period, and it was renovated in 1996-97. Due to a lack of space in the mosque, worshippers were offering namaz outside the mosque, on the road, which impacted traffic flow. Kishan Negi, the Chamber of Commerce president in the late 1990s, made a contribution for renovations to the mosque.

== See also ==
- Islam in India
- List of mosques in India
