= Aampokhra Range, Nainital =

Village in Uttarakhand, India

Aampokhra, or Aam Pokhra, is a village in Uttarakhand, northern India. It is located in Ramnagar tehsil of Nainital district, approximately 81 kilometers from Nainital, the headquarters of the district.

== Demographic ==
With the location code 055442, the village is covered with an area of 300 ha (740 acres). The households in the village were 1,612 with the total population of 8,269 in which 4,295 were males and 3,974 were females. The persons in the age group of 0 to 6 were 1,343 in which 688 were males and 655 were females. In terms of education the village had approximate 5,262 literates whereas 3,007 were illiterates.

== In News ==
In January 2020 there was an incident where a 34 year old van Gurjar was attacked by a tiger. The victim was later referred to the nearest hospital.

== Geography ==
Aampokhra Range is located at 29.3662° N, 78.9854° E. The village is based at the foothills of the Himalayas. It visited by many tourists due to its beautiful sightseeing. The distance of Jim Corbett National Park from here is 25 km (16 mi) via NH309.

== Local Demographic ==
The local language is Khariboli, but knowledge of Hindi is widespread. The PIN code of the village is 244715 and the telephone code is 055354.

== Nearby villages ==
The villages near to Aampokhra Range are -

- Lampur Moti
- Lampura Lachhi
- Shahbazpur
- Bichpuri Range
- North Jaspur Range
- South Jaspur Range
- Kanda Range
- Dogadda Range
- Ramnagar Range
- Bijrani Range
- Kosi Range

== Transportation Facility ==
Following are the transport modes available here-

- The nearest railway stations are Haldwani, Kathgodam, Lal Kuan, Ramnagar
- The nearest airports are Jolly Grant Airport, Dehradun and Pantnagar Airport, Pantnagar.
