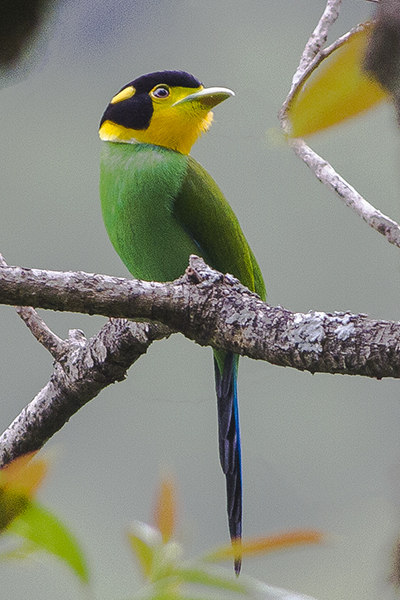
- From Pangolakha Wildlife Sanctuary; East Sikkim (India)

Conservation status
- Least Concern (IUCN 3.1)

Scientific classification
- Kingdom: Animalia
- Phylum: Chordata
- Class: Aves
- Order: Passeriformes
- Family: Eurylaimidae
- Genus: Psarisomus; Swainson, 1837
- Species: P. dalhousiae

Binomial name
- Psarisomus dalhousiae (Jameson, 1835)

= Long-tailed broadbill =

Species of bird

The long-tailed broadbill (Psarisomus dalhousiae) is a species of bird that is found in the Himalayas, extending east through Northeastern India to Southeast Asia. It is the only bird in the genus Psarisomus. The long-tailed broadbill is about 25 cm (10 inches) in length and weighs between 50 and 60 grams. It can be identified by its shrill call.

The long-tailed broadbill displays a yellow plumage on the throat. Blueish-green plumage on the belly, back, and wings. The long-tailed broadbill is a forest bird that lives on insects. It is very sociable and normally travels in large, noisy parties except during the mating season. It builds a pear-shaped nest in a tree. The female usually lays between 5 and 6 eggs that are incubated by both sexes; both sexes also help to feed the young.

== Taxonomy ==
The generic name Psarisomus comes from the name Psaris, a synonym of Tityra and the Greek word σῶμα sōma "body".

The long-tailed broadbill is a songbird (Passeriformes) that belongs in the family Eurylaimidae, a group of birds that have broad heads and have flat, broad beak. It is the only bird that belongs to the genus Psarisomus. The scientific name commemorates Christina Broun, Countess of Dalhousie (1786–1839), wife of George Ramsay, 9th Earl of Dalhousie.

There are currently five subspecies that are recognized:

- P. d. dalhousiae – Himalayan foothills E from N India (Uttarakhand) and Nepal, SE Bangladesh, and from N Myanmar and S China (W & S Yunnan, SW Guizhou, SW Guangxi) S to N Thailand, Laos and C Vietnam (C Annam); reported also from SE Tibet.
- P. d. cyanicauda – SE Thailand and Cambodia.
- P. d. divinus – S Vietnam (S Annam).
- P. d. psittacinus – Peninsular Malaysia and Sumatra.
- P. d. borneensis 1904 – N Borneo.

== Description ==
Adult long-tailed broadbills have a bright yellow throat and face, where the yellow patch ranges on each side of the occiput. The yellow feathers continue down to a form a thin band around the neck. There is a thin layer of pale-yellow/whitish feathers that envelops the yellow patch below their throat. Some even have a hint of pale yellow-green on their chin. They have a helmet-like black cap with a sleek blue patch on the crown and a smaller blue patch at the back of their neck. The feathers along the back, belly and top of the wings are bright green produced by a combination of pigmentary and structural color. The underparts of the wings are a lighter green or blueish green. The primary feathers are black, with a metallic blue margin at the base of the external web and a white spot on the base of the inner web.

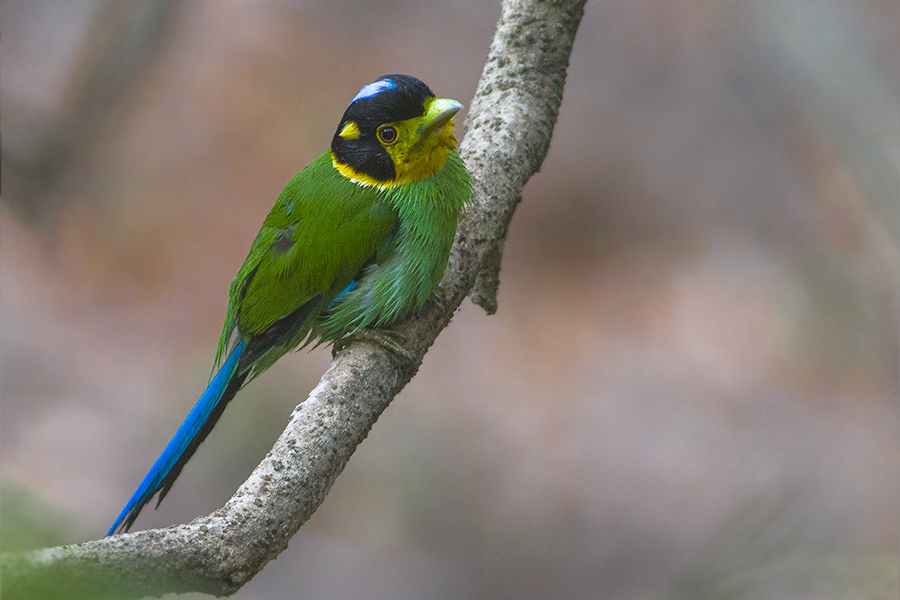
From Naina Devi Himalayan Bird Conservation Reserve, Uttarakhand, India.

Long-tailed broadbill have a long blue tail, but the under-tail is black. They have strong, broad bill that is yellowish green in color with lighter edges. They have a pea-green toes and brown legs. Juvenile long-tailed broadbills have a shorter tail, green head with duller plumage. A full-grown adult stand about 10 inches in length (25 cm) and weighs anywhere between 50 and 60 grams.

== Habitat and distribution ==
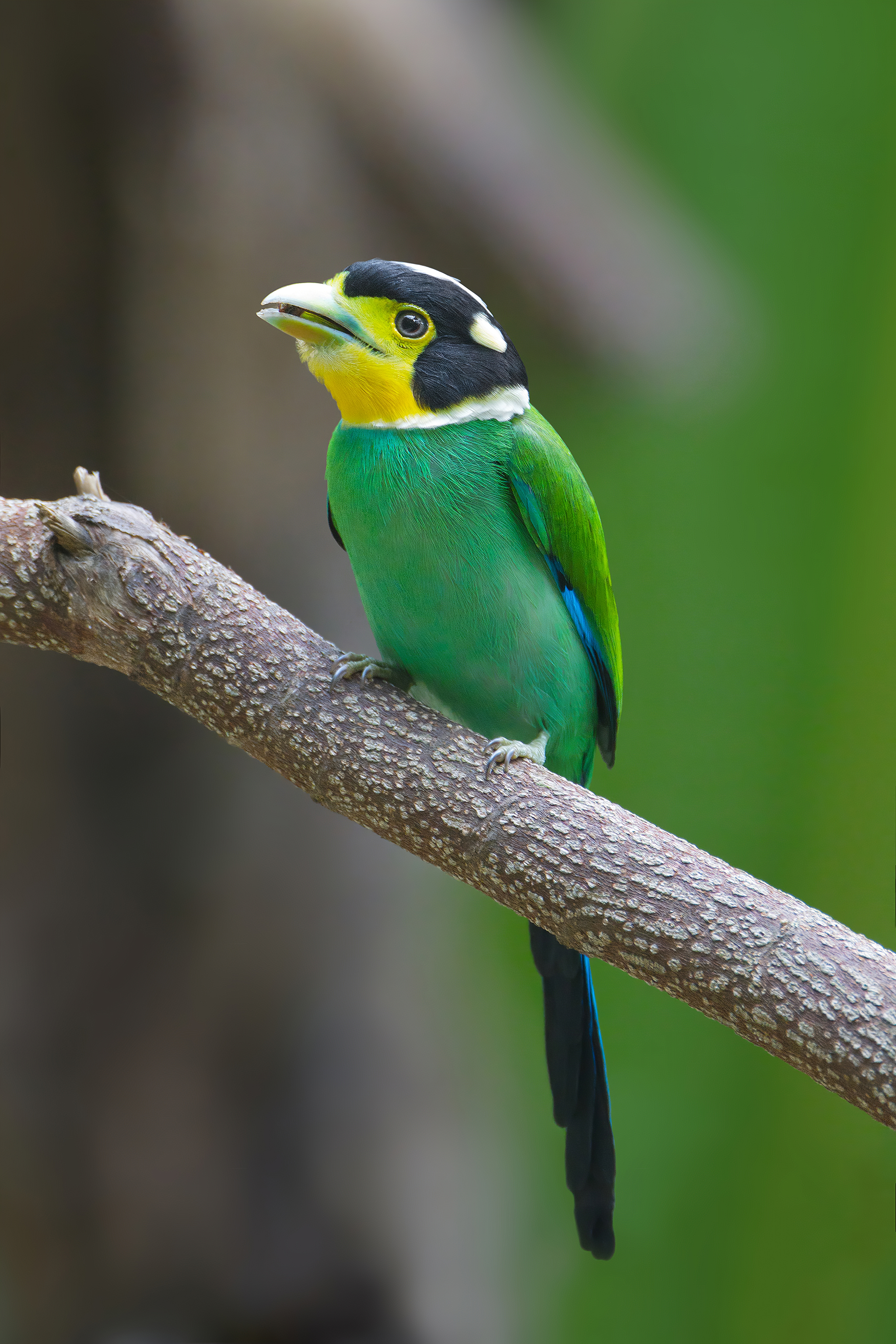
P. d. psittacinus

The long-tailed broadbill is found in the Himalayas and Myanmar and discontinuously found through South-East Asia and the Malay Peninsula to Sumatra and Borneo. They are distributed in a variety of countries: India, Nepal, Pakistan, Bhutan, Myanmar, Thailand, Cambodia, Laos, Vietnam, China, Malaysia and Indonesia.

They are commonly found in broad-leaved evergreen forests, ranging in altitudes from 150 to 2500 meters. Their natural habitats include: forests, streams and creeks, tropical and subtropical moist lowland forests, tropical and subtropical moist mountain forests. They seem to have a habitat preference nears small bodies of water such as streams, freshwater and wetlands. They are resident, non-migratory species. The populations of long-tailed broadbills that live in the higher altitudes of the Himalayas often move down to lower altitudes during cold winter months.

== Behaviour ==
Long-tailed broadbills are social birds that are usually seen foraging about in small flocks. They have also been seen in mixed-species flocks. Despite their loud high-pitched calls, they are relatively shy birds that usually hide among the foliage of trees. They are especially noisy during breeding season.

=== Diet ===
These birds are insectivorous and are commonly found foraging forests for small insects. They can be seen foraging in small parties of up to 15 individuals during non-breeding seasons. They feed primarily on grasshoppers, crickets, locust, beetles, aphids, dipteran flies, bugs, moths and spiders. They may occasionally feed on small frogs, berries and other fruits.

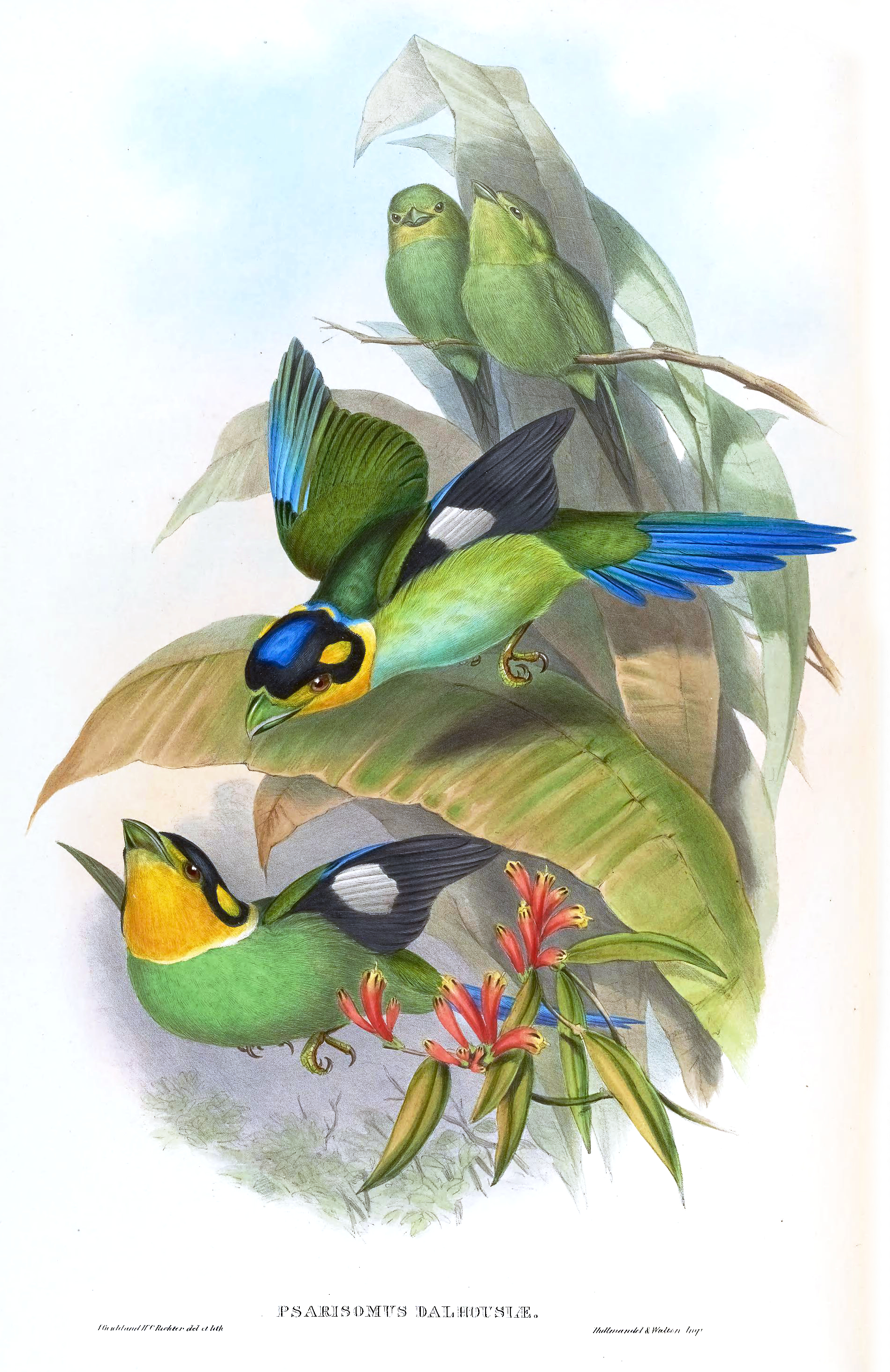
In John Gould's Birds of Asia

=== Breeding and nesting ===
The breeding seasons of the long-tailed broadbill may vary according to location. Populations that live in the Indian Subcontinent breed from March to April, while populations residing in/near Myanmar begin breeding from April. The female will lay between 5 and 6 eggs, which are white and oval shaped. Both sexes incubate and feed the chicks. It is even suggested that Long-tailed broadbills may be cooperative breeders, since more than two individuals have been observed around the nest.

They build a large pear-shaped nest that is attached to the branch of a tall tree. The nest has a small 1-2 inch circular entrance on the side of the structure, which is usually protected by a cushion of leaves. The nest is composed of fine roots, dead leaves, creepers, mosses and other stringy vegetable matter. Once the young chicks become independent juveniles, they often disperse and settle in new locations within the habitat range.

=== Vocalization ===
The long-tailed broadbill's call is a series of loud, sharp, downward-inflected whistles, "pseeu..pseeu..pseeu" and "tseeay..tseeay" sounds on a descending scale. They may also make a sharp rasping "pseeup" sound.

== Conservation ==
According to the ICUN Red list of threatened species, the long-tailed broadbill is of least concern. They are fairly common throughout their range and are found in many national parks where they are protected throughout its range.
