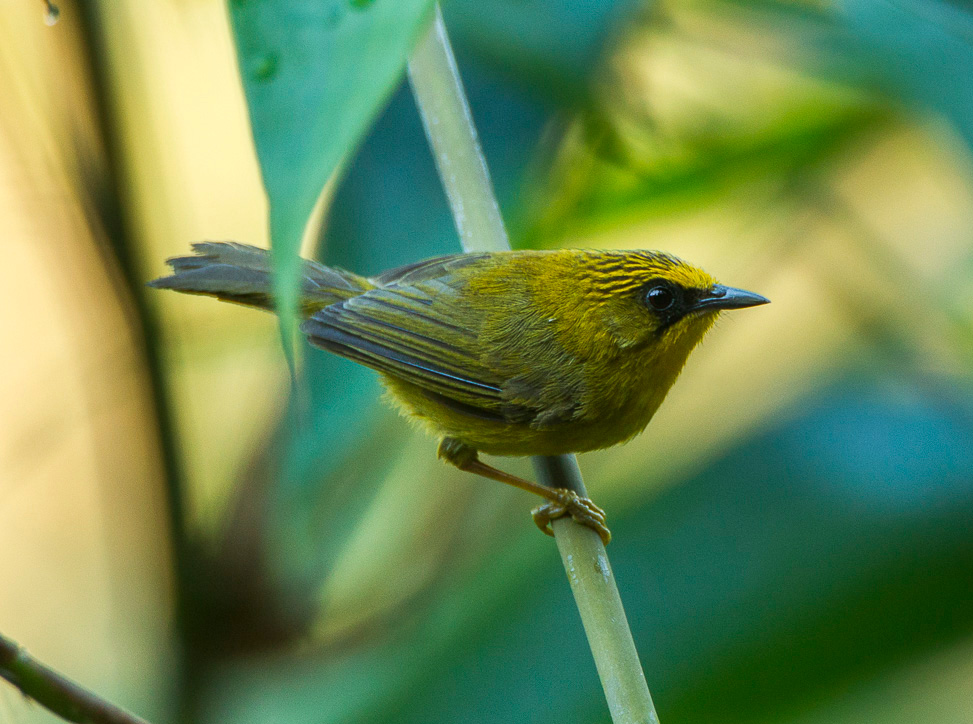
- near Tingtibi, Bhutan.

Conservation status
- Least Concern (IUCN 3.1)

Scientific classification
- Kingdom: Animalia
- Phylum: Chordata
- Class: Aves
- Order: Passeriformes
- Family: Timaliidae
- Genus: Cyanoderma
- Species: C. chrysaeum

Binomial name
- Cyanoderma chrysaeum (Blyth, 1844)

= Golden babbler =

Species of bird

The golden babbler (Cyanoderma chrysaeum) is a babbler species in the family Timaliidae. It occurs from the foothills of the Eastern Himalayas to Southeast Asia and inhabits subtropical lowland and montane forests. It is listed as Least Concern on the IUCN Red List because of its wide distribution.

It has olive-green wings and yellow underparts. Its crown and nape are golden-yellow with narrow stripes. It is 12 cm (4.7 in) long and weighs 6–10 g (0.21–0.35 oz).

Stachyris chrysaea was the scientific name proposed by Edward Blyth in 1844 who described an olivaceous babbler with a yellow crown from Nepal. Since 2016, it is recognised as a Cyanoderma species.
