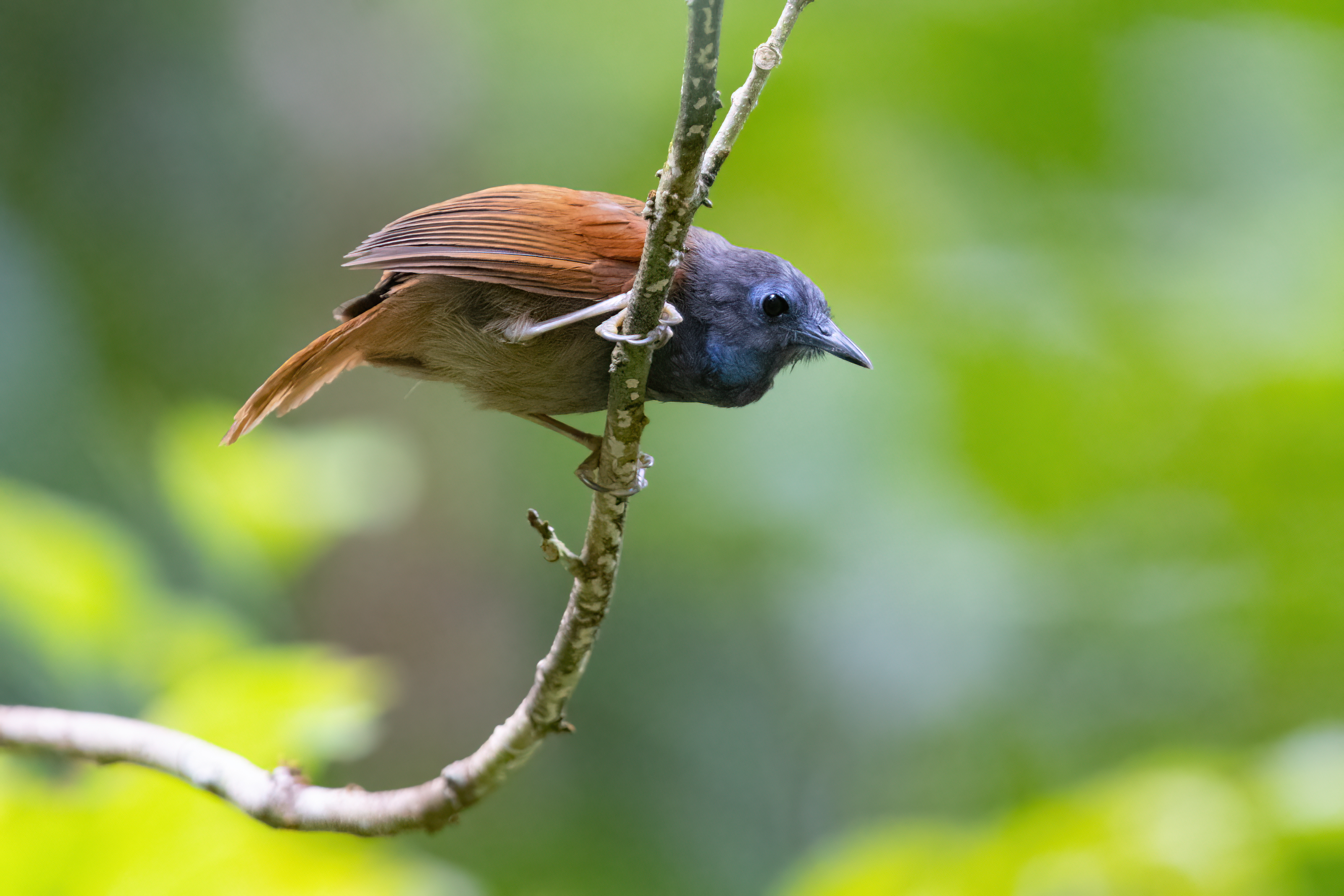

Conservation status
- Least Concern (IUCN 3.1)

Scientific classification
- Kingdom: Animalia
- Phylum: Chordata
- Class: Aves
- Order: Passeriformes
- Family: Timaliidae
- Genus: Cyanoderma
- Species: C. erythropterum

Binomial name
- Cyanoderma erythropterum (Blyth, 1842)

= Chestnut-winged babbler =

Species of bird

The chestnut-winged babbler (Cyanoderma erythropterum) is a babbler species in the family Timaliidae.

== Description ==
The chestnut-winged babbler is chestnut-brown with a greyish face and underparts, and is 12.5–13.5 cm (4.9–5.3 in) long. It feeds on small Coleoptera beetles, Phasmida insects, ants, and Hemiptera bugs. Its foraging strategy is gleaning.

Timalia erythroptera was the scientific name proposed by Edward Blyth in 1842 for an olive-brown babbler from Nepal. It was later placed in the genus Stachyris, but since 2020 is recognised as a Cyanoderma species. The grey-hooded babbler (C. bicolor) of Borneo was formerly considered conspecific.

== Distribution and habitat ==
The chestnut-winged babbler occurs in the Malay Peninsula from southern Thailand to Singapore, and in Sumatra. It inhabits forests and shrublands up to an elevation of 800 m (2,600 ft). It is listed as Least Concern on the IUCN Red List.
