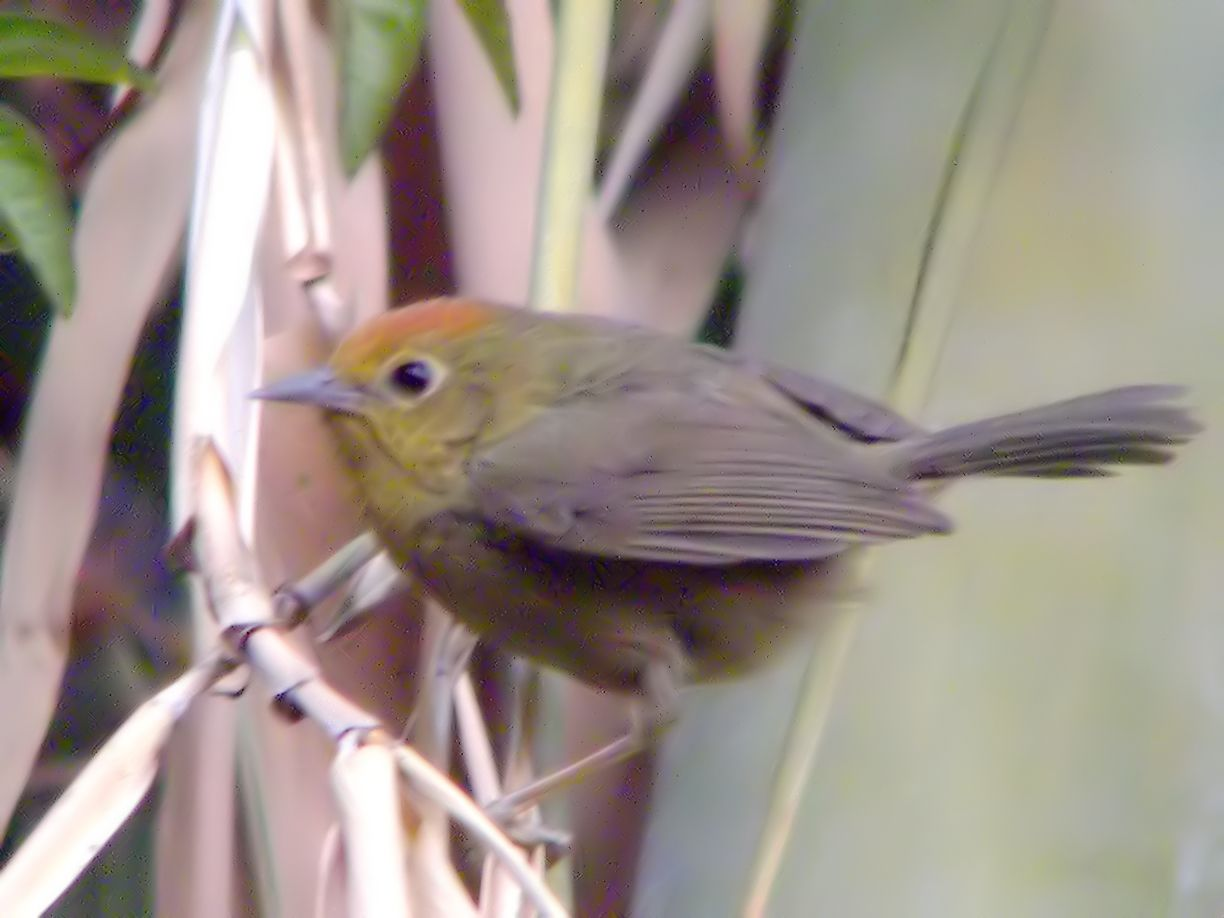
- Rufous-capped babbler (Cyanoderma ruficeps)

Scientific classification
- Kingdom: Animalia
- Phylum: Chordata
- Class: Aves
- Order: Passeriformes
- Family: Timaliidae
- Genus: Cyanoderma; Salvadori, 1874

Type species
- Timalia erythroptera (chestnut-winged babbler) Blyth, 1842

Species
- See text

= Cyanoderma =

Genus of birds

Cyanoderma is a genus of passerine birds in the Old World babbler family Timaliidae. Many of these species were formerly placed in the genus Stachyris

== Taxonomy ==
A molecular phylogenetic study published in 2012 found that the genus Stachyris was paraphyletic. In the subsequent reorganization to create monophyletic genera, the genus Cyanoderma was resurrected to accommodate a group of species formerly assigned to Stachyris. The genus Cyanoderma had been introduced in 1874 by the Italian zoologist Tommaso Salvadori with chestnut-winged babbler as the type species. The name combines the Ancient Greek kuanos meaning "dark-blue" with derma meaning "skin".

== Species ==
The genus contains the following seven species:

Image	Common name	Scientific name	Distribution
	Chestnut-winged babbler	Cyanoderma erythropterum	Malay Peninsula, Sumatra
	Grey-hooded babbler	Cyanoderma bicolor	Borneo
	Crescent-chested babbler	Cyanoderma melanothorax	Java and Bali
	Rufous-fronted babbler	Cyanoderma rufifrons	Sikkim, Bhutan Dooars and northeast India
	Rufous-capped babbler	Cyanoderma ruficeps	Eastern Himalayas to northern Thailand, Laos, eastern China to Vietnam and Taiwan
	Black-chinned babbler	Cyanoderma pyrrhops	the Himalayas from the Murree Hills in Pakistan to eastern Nepal
	Golden babbler	Cyanoderma chrysaeum	the Eastern Himalayas to Southeast Asia

Deignan's babbler Cyanoderma rodolphei collected in 1939 at Doi Chiang Dao in Thailand is considered synonymous with the rufous-fronted babbler.
