= Bicolored babbler =

Conservation status
- Least Concern (IUCN 3.1)

Scientific classification
- Kingdom: Animalia
- Phylum: Chordata
- Class: Aves
- Order: Passeriformes
- Family: Timaliidae
- Genus: Cyanoderma
- Species: C. bicolor

Binomial name
- Cyanoderma bicolor (Blyth, 1865)

Species of bird

The bicolored babbler or grey-hooded babbler (Cyanoderma bicolor) is a babbler species in the family Timaliidae. It occurs in Borneo and Banggi Island. The bicolored babbler was formerly considered conspecific to the chestnut-winged babbler (Cyanoderma erythropterum). It is listed as least concern on the IUCN Red List.
