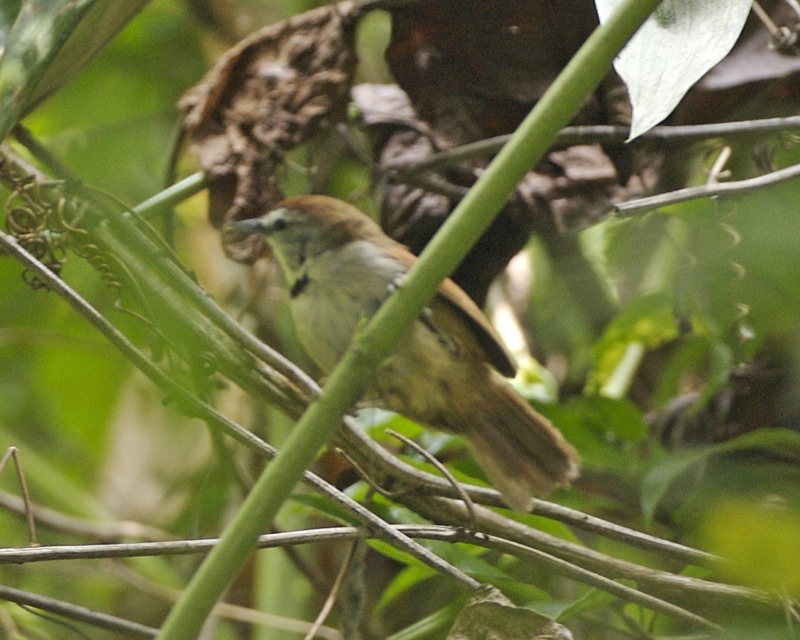

Conservation status
- Least Concern (IUCN 3.1)

Scientific classification
- Kingdom: Animalia
- Phylum: Chordata
- Class: Aves
- Order: Passeriformes
- Family: Timaliidae
- Genus: Cyanoderma
- Species: C. melanothorax

Binomial name
- Cyanoderma melanothorax (Temminck, 1823)

= Crescent-chested babbler =

Species of bird

The crescent-chested babbler (Cyanoderma melanothorax) is a babbler species in the family Timaliidae and is native to the Indonesian islands of Java and Bali. It inhabits subtropical or tropical moist lowland forest, montane forest and shrubland. It is listed as Least Concern on the IUCN Red List.

It is ochreous-brown, has rufous-coloured wings, paler underparts and a black crescent across its breast. It is 13 cm (5.1 in) long.

Myiothera melanothorax was the scientific name proposed by Coenraad Jacob Temminck in 1823 who described a babbler from Java. The generic name Cyanoderma was proposed by Tommaso Salvadori in 1874 for babblers with slender and pointed beaks. It was later placed in the genus Stachyris, but since 2020 is recognised as a Cyanoderma species.
