= Nainital Forest Division =

Forest division in Uttarakhand, India

- Type: Forest division
- Legal status: Active
- Purpose: Forest conservation and wildlife management
- Headquarters: Nainital, Uttarakhand, India
- Coordinates: 29.3803°N 79.4636°E
- Region served: Nainital district
- Official language: Hindi, English
- Parent organization: Uttarakhand Forest Department
- Website: forest.uk.gov.in

Nainital Forest Division is an administrative forest division of the Uttarakhand Forest Department located in Nainital district in the Indian state of Uttarakhand.

== See also ==
- Uttarakhand Forest Department
- Nainital district
- Jim Corbett National Park
