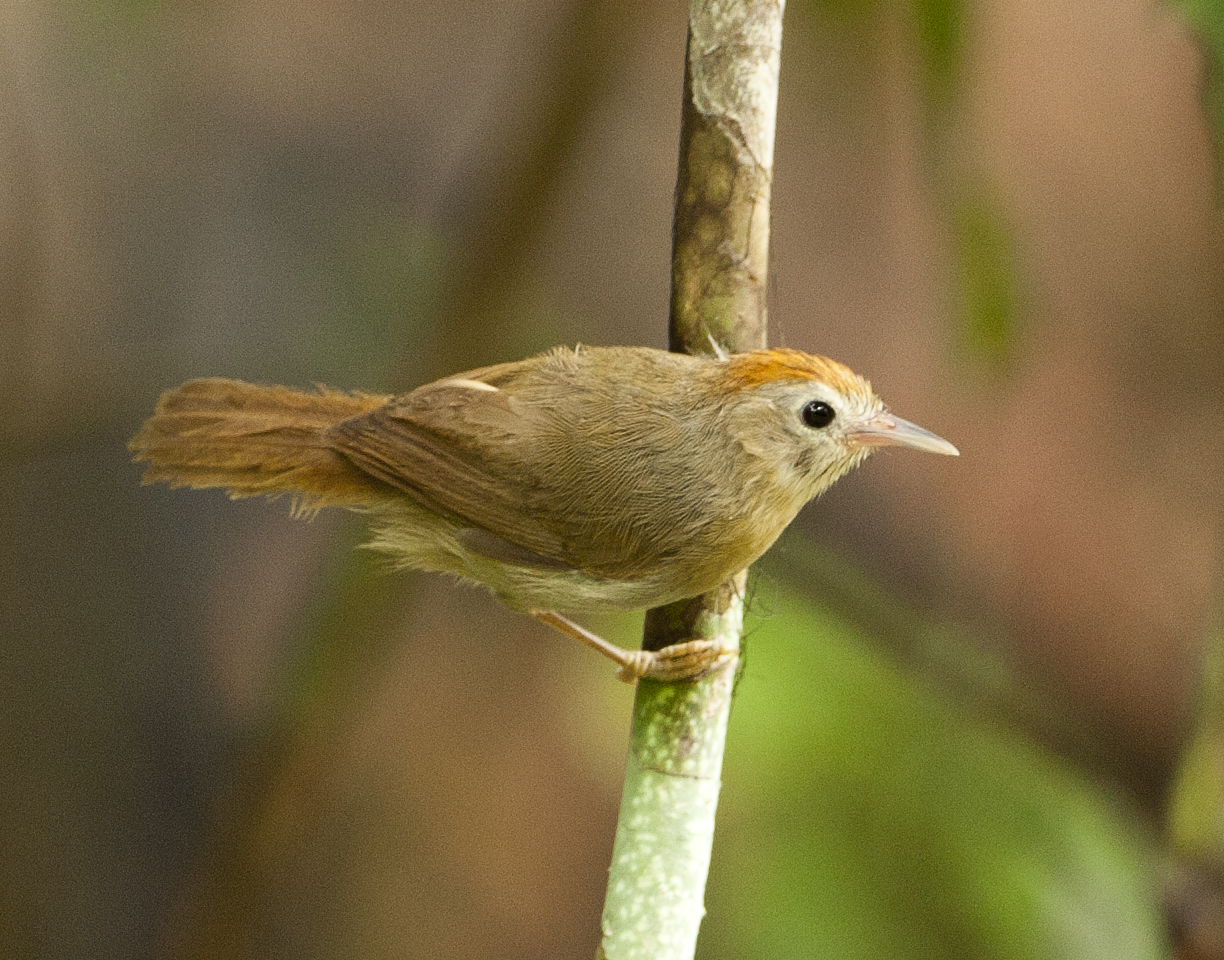

Conservation status
- Least Concern (IUCN 3.1)

Scientific classification
- Kingdom: Animalia
- Phylum: Chordata
- Class: Aves
- Order: Passeriformes
- Family: Timaliidae
- Genus: Cyanoderma
- Species: C. rufifrons

Binomial name
- Cyanoderma rufifrons (Hume, 1873)

= Rufous-fronted babbler =

Species of bird

The rufous-fronted babbler (Cyanoderma rufifrons) is a babbler species in the Old World babbler family. It occurs in the Eastern Himalayan foothills, Myanmar, Thailand, northern Indochina and south to the Malay Peninsula and the islands of Sumatra and Borneo. The buff-chested babbler is now subsumed into this species.

== Taxonomy ==
The rufous-fronted babbler was formally described in 1873 by the English naturalist Allan Octavian Hume based on a specimen that had been collected by Eugene W. Oates on the western slopes of the Pegu Range of central Myanmar. Hume placed the specimen in the genus Stachyris and coined the binomial name Stachyris rufifrons. The specific epithet rufifrons is modern Latin meaning "red-fronted", from Latin rufus meaning "red" or "rufous" and frons, frontis meaning "forehead" or "brow". The rufous-fronted babbler is now one of seven babblers placed in the genus Cyanoderma that was first introduced in 1874 by the Italian zoologist Tommaso Salvadori.

Nine subspecies are recognised:

- C. r. ambiguum (Harington, 1915) – east Himalayas, northwest Myanmar and northeast India
- C. r. planicola (Mayr, 1941) – northeast Myanmar and southwest China
- C. r. adjunctum (Deignan, 1939) – north, east Thailand and north Indochina
- C. r. insuspectum (Deignan, 1939) – south Laos
- C. r. pallescens Ticehurst, 1932 – west Myanmar
- C. r. rufifrons (Hume, 1873) – southeast Myanmar and west Thailand
- C. r. obscurum Baker, ECS, 1917 – south Myanmar and southwest Thailand
- C. r. poliogaster (Hume, 1880) – south Malay Peninsula, Sumatra and north, central Borneo
- C. r. sarawacense Chasen, 1939 – northwest Borneo

The first four subspecies on the above list (ambiguum, planicola, adjunctum and insuspectum) were formerly sometimes treated as a separate species, the buff-chested babbler (Cyanoderma ambiguum).

The binomial name Stachyris rodolphei was proposed by Herbert Girton Deignan in 1939 for three babbler specimens collected at Doi Chiang Dao in Thailand. The name is now considered synonymous with the nominate subspecies C. r. rufifrons.

== Description ==
It is buff-brown with paler brown underparts and a dull rufous crown. Its upper wings, tail, supercilium and lores are whitish-grey. It is 12 cm (4.7 in) long and weighs 9–12 g (0.32–0.42 oz). Its song is a high-pitched tuh tuh-tuh-tuh-tuh-tuh.
