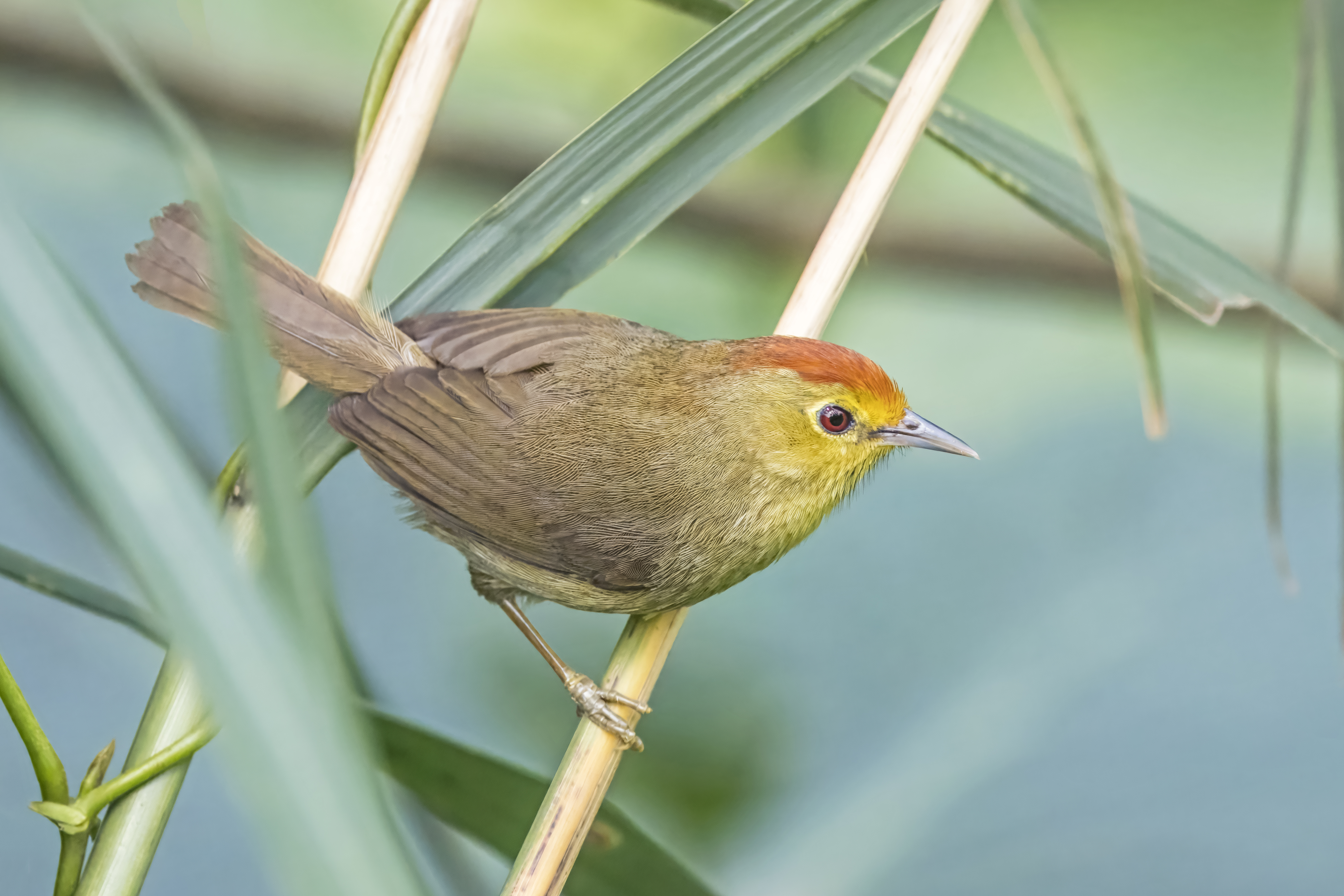
- C. r. praecognitum, Taiwan

Conservation status
- Least Concern (IUCN 3.1)

Scientific classification
- Kingdom: Animalia
- Phylum: Chordata
- Class: Aves
- Order: Passeriformes
- Family: Timaliidae
- Genus: Cyanoderma
- Species: C. ruficeps

Binomial name
- Cyanoderma ruficeps (Blyth, 1847)

= Rufous-capped babbler =

Species of bird

The rufous-capped babbler (Cyanoderma ruficeps) is a babbler species in the family Timaliidae. It occurs from the Eastern Himalayas to northern Thailand, Laos, eastern China to Vietnam and Taiwan. It inhabits temperate forest with dense bushes or bamboo and is listed as Least Concern on the IUCN Red List.

It is pale olive with a bright rufous crown and nape, measures 12 cm (4.7 in) long and weighs 7–12 g (0.25–0.42 oz).

Stachyris ruficeps was the scientific name proposed by Edward Blyth in 1847 for an olive-coloured babbler with a ferruginous crown and a white throat collected in Darjeeling. It was later placed in the genus Stachyridopsis.
