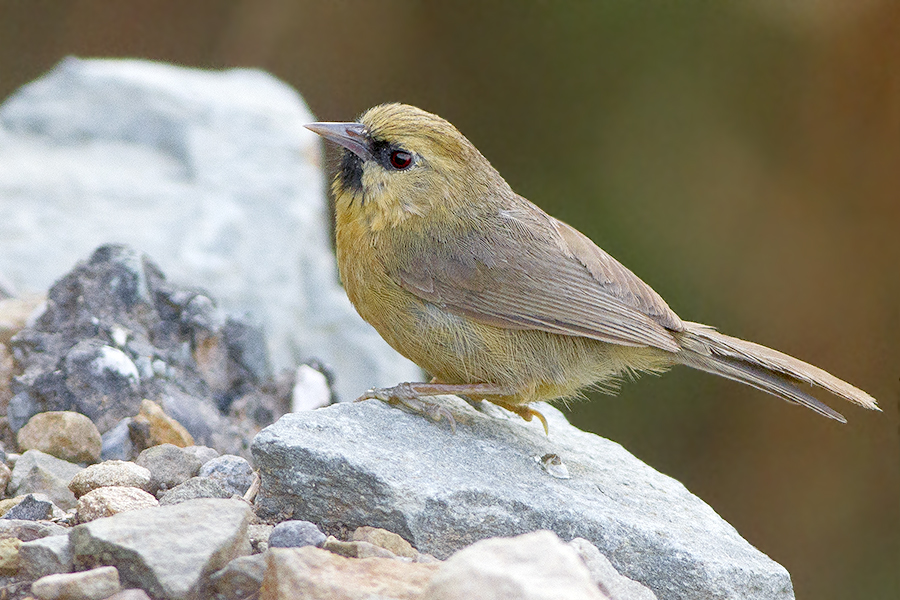
- Adult in Naina Devi Himalayan Bird Conservation Reserve

Conservation status
- Least Concern (IUCN 3.1)

Scientific classification
- Kingdom: Animalia
- Phylum: Chordata
- Class: Aves
- Order: Passeriformes
- Family: Timaliidae
- Genus: Cyanoderma
- Species: C. pyrrhops

Binomial name
- Cyanoderma pyrrhops (Blyth, 1844)

= Black-chinned babbler =

Species of bird

The black-chinned babbler (Cyanoderma pyrrhops) is a babbler species in the family Timaliidae. It occurs in the foothills of the Himalayas from the Murree Hills in Pakistan to eastern Nepal. It inhabits subtropical and temperate forest at 245–2,750 m (804–9,022 ft) altitudes. It is terrestrial. It is listed as Least Concern on the IUCN Red List.

It is biscuit-coloured, has a black chin and lores and a buffy grey crown. It is 10 cm (3.9 in) long and weighs 8–12 g (0.28–0.42 oz).

It is omnivorous.

Stachyris pyrrhops was the scientific name proposed by Edward Blyth in 1844 who described a greenish olivaceous babbler with a black chin and black lores from Nepal. It was later placed in the genus Stachyridopsis.
