= Nainital district =

- District of Uttarakhand
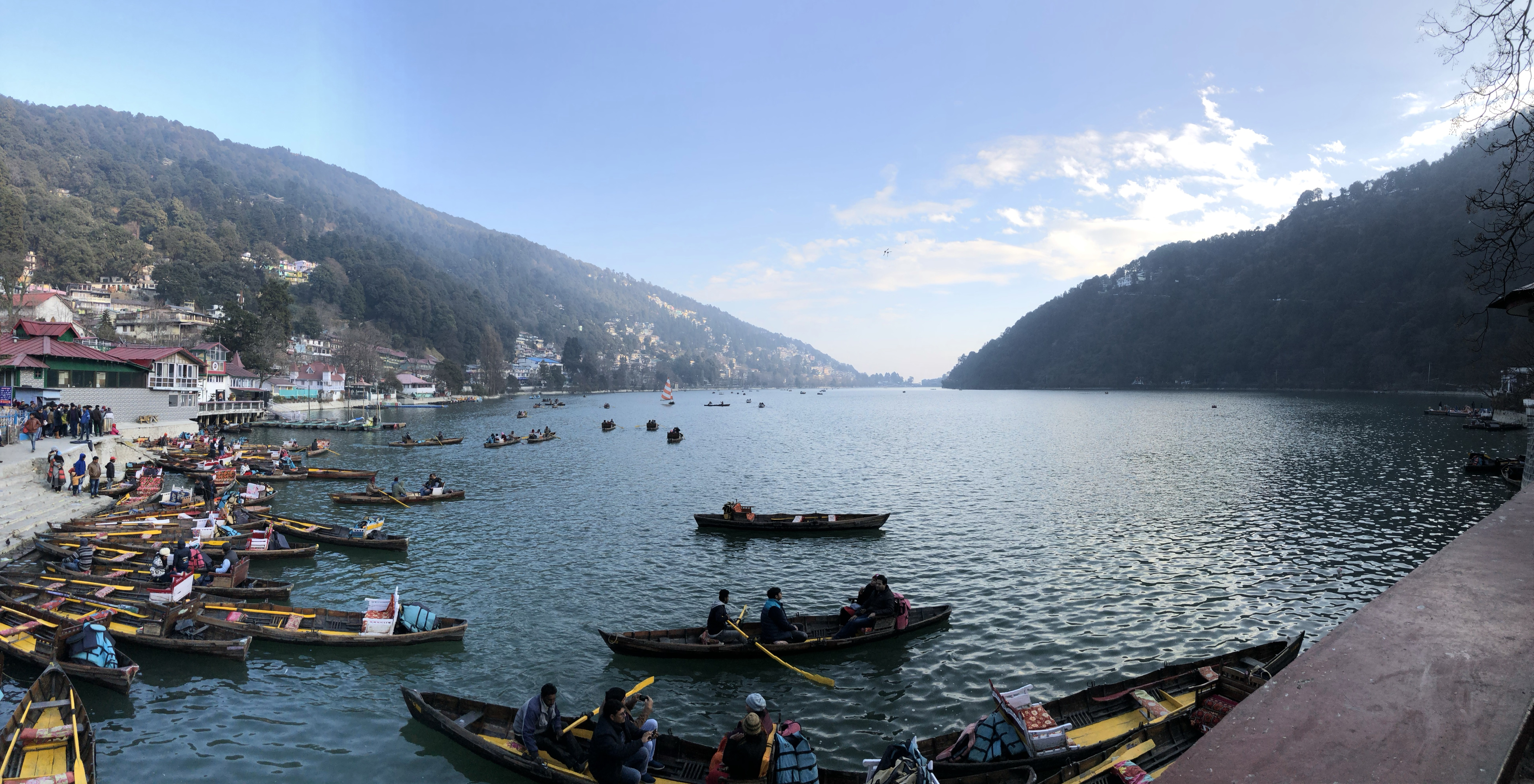
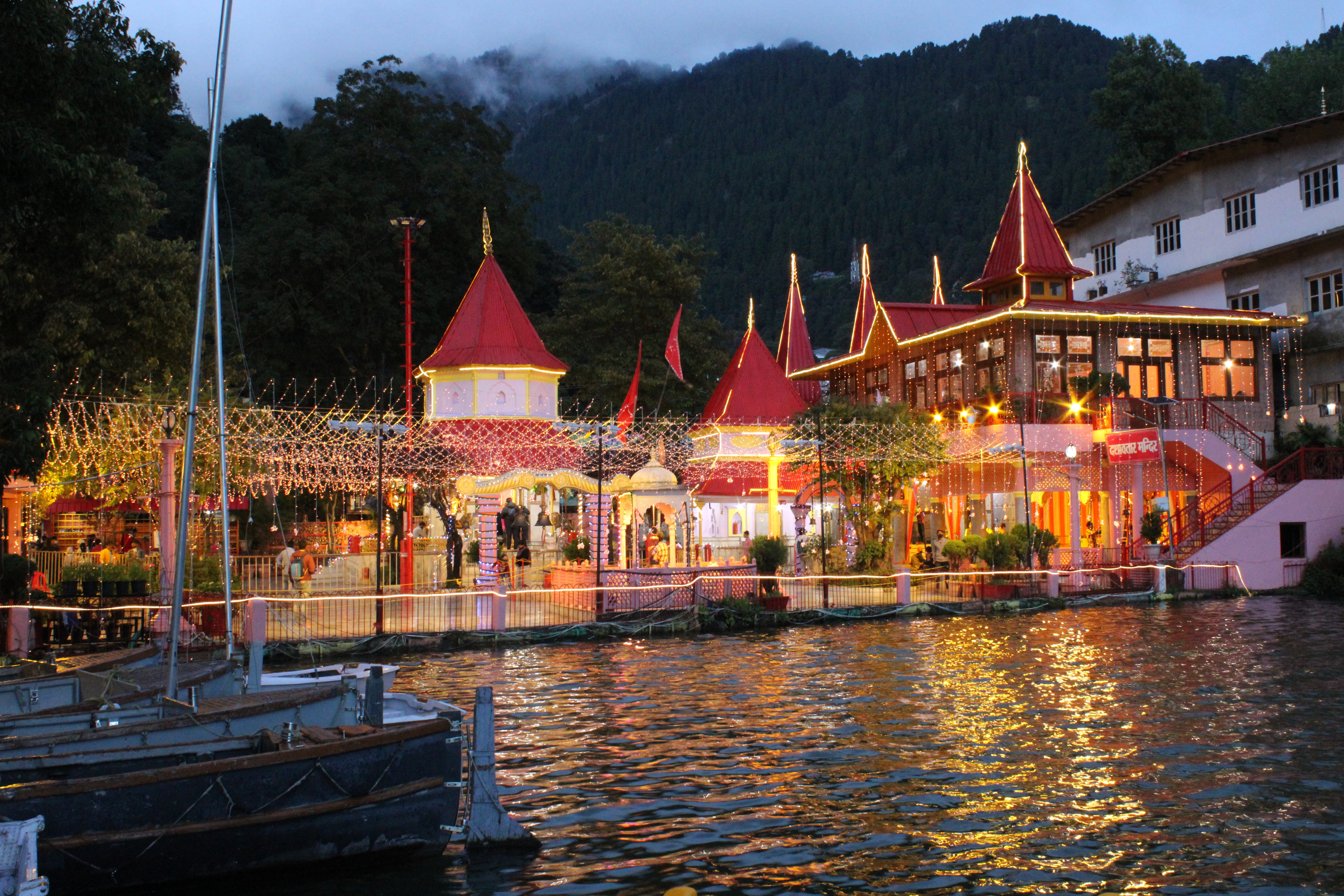
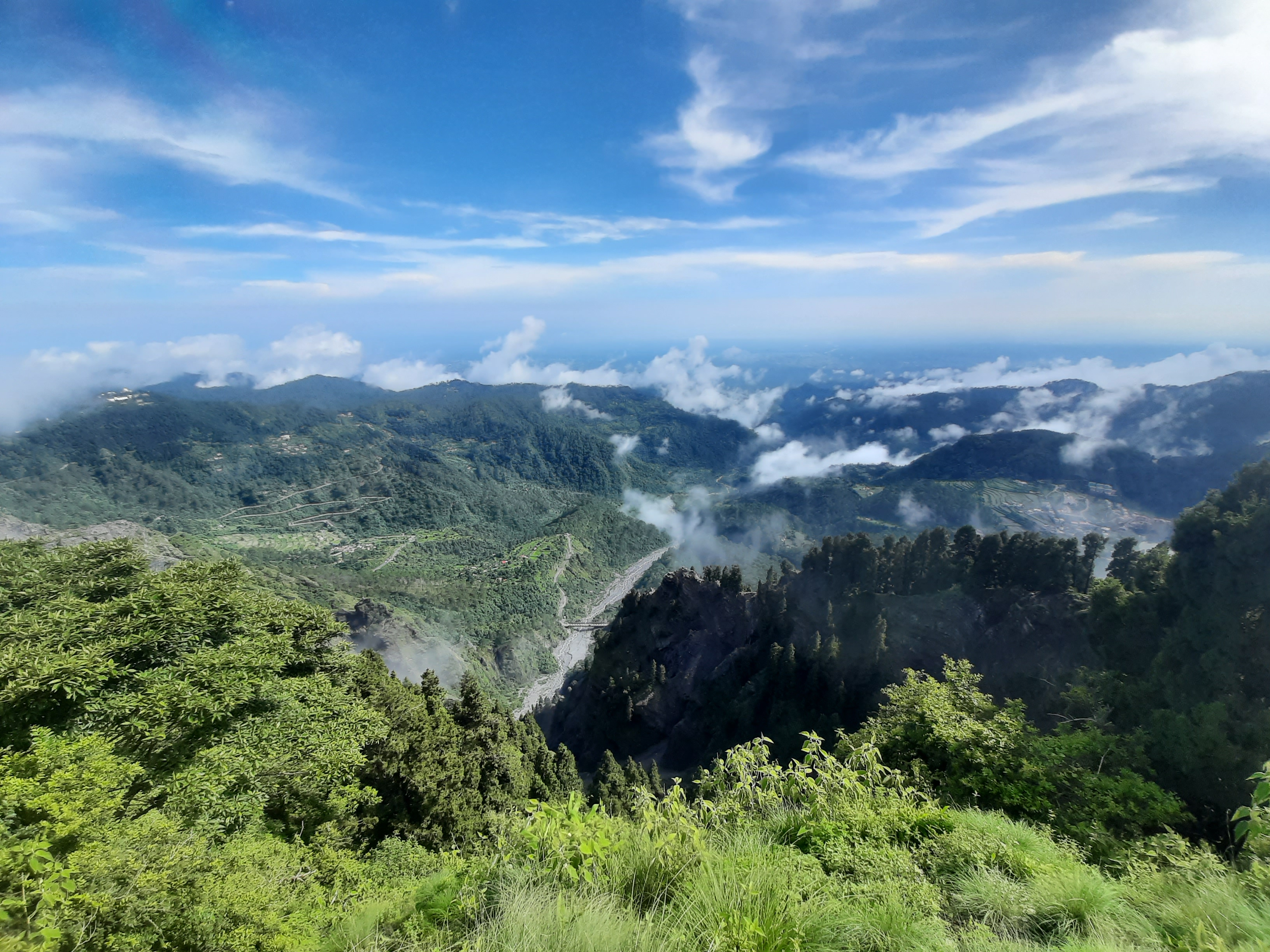
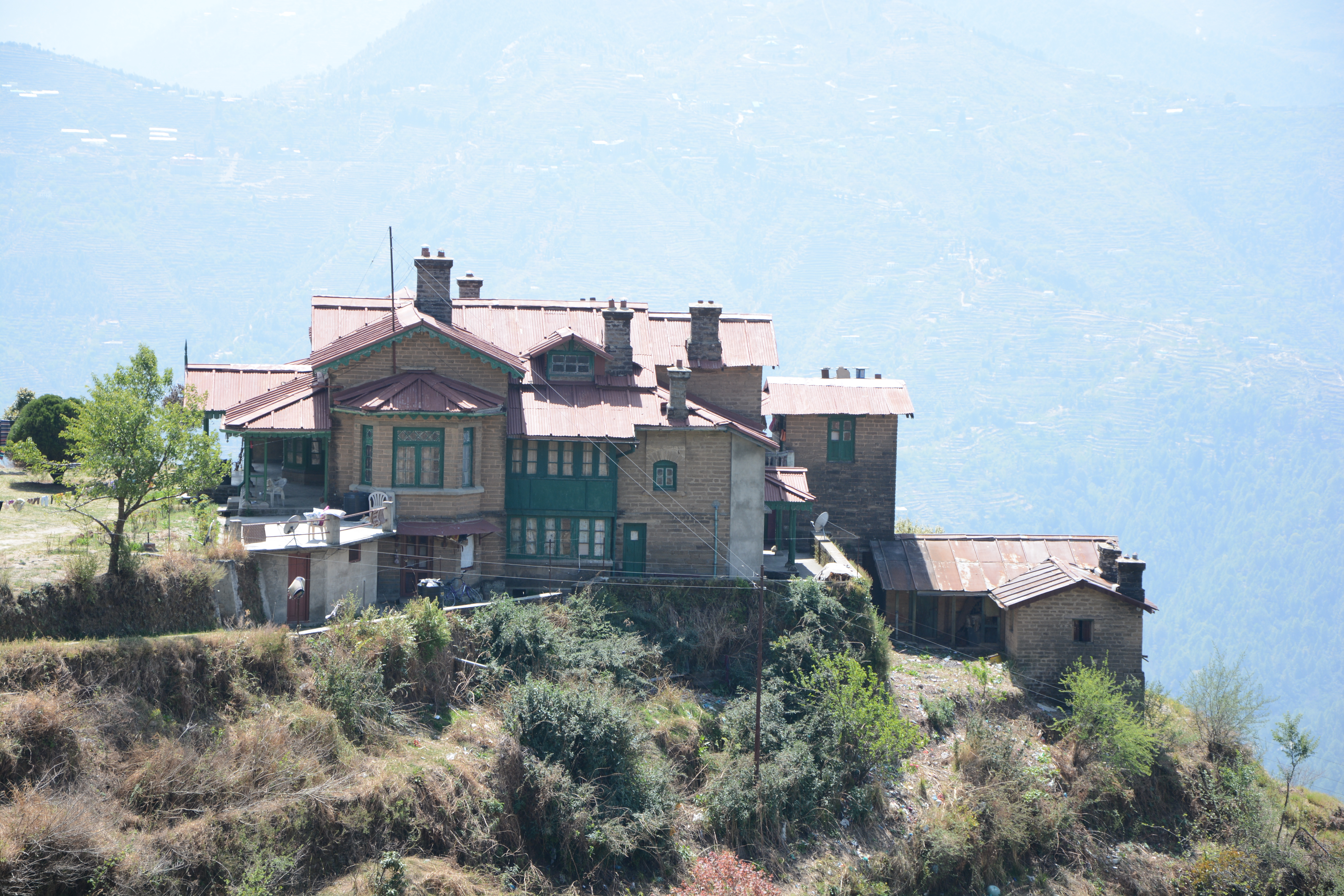
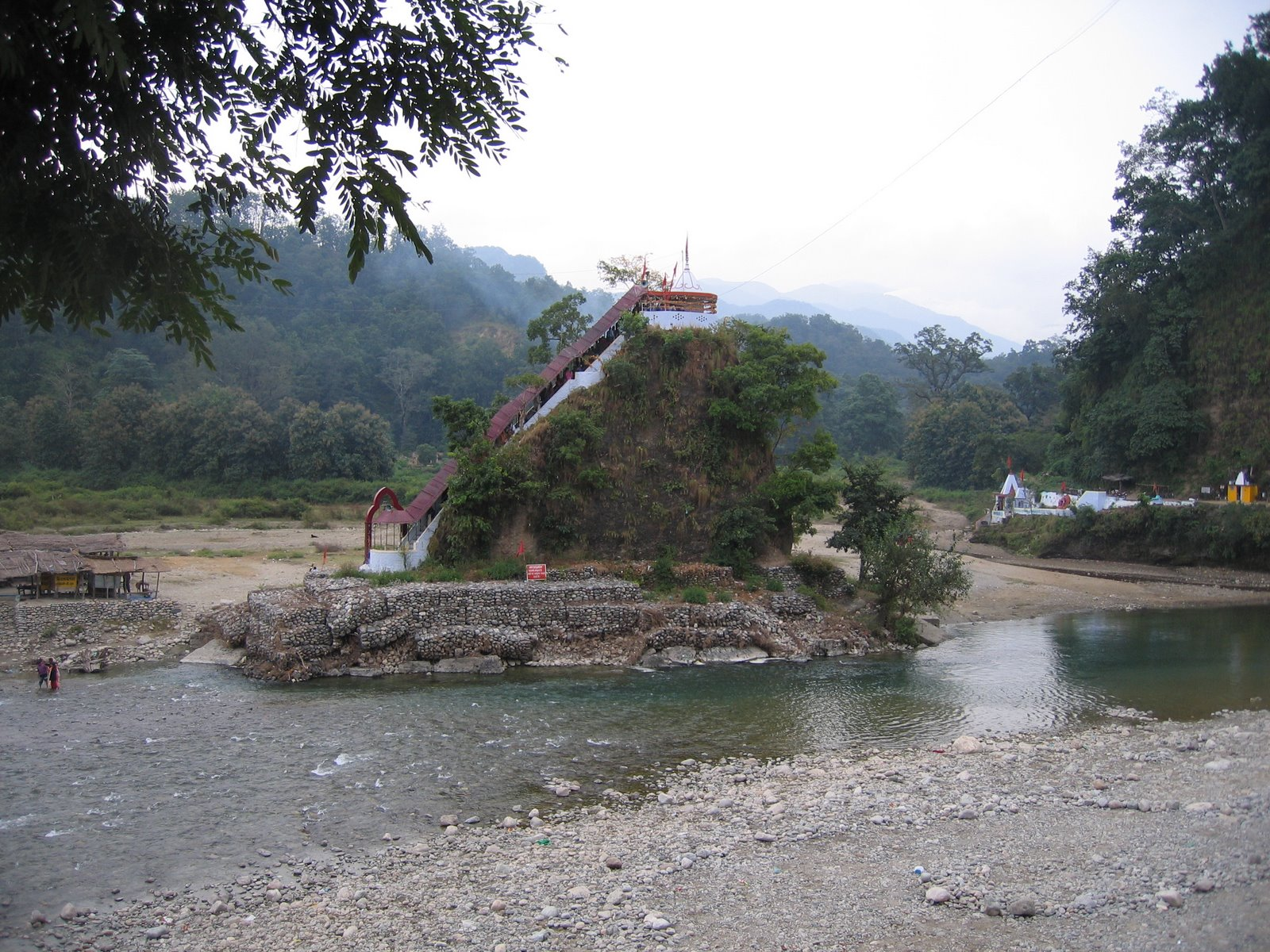
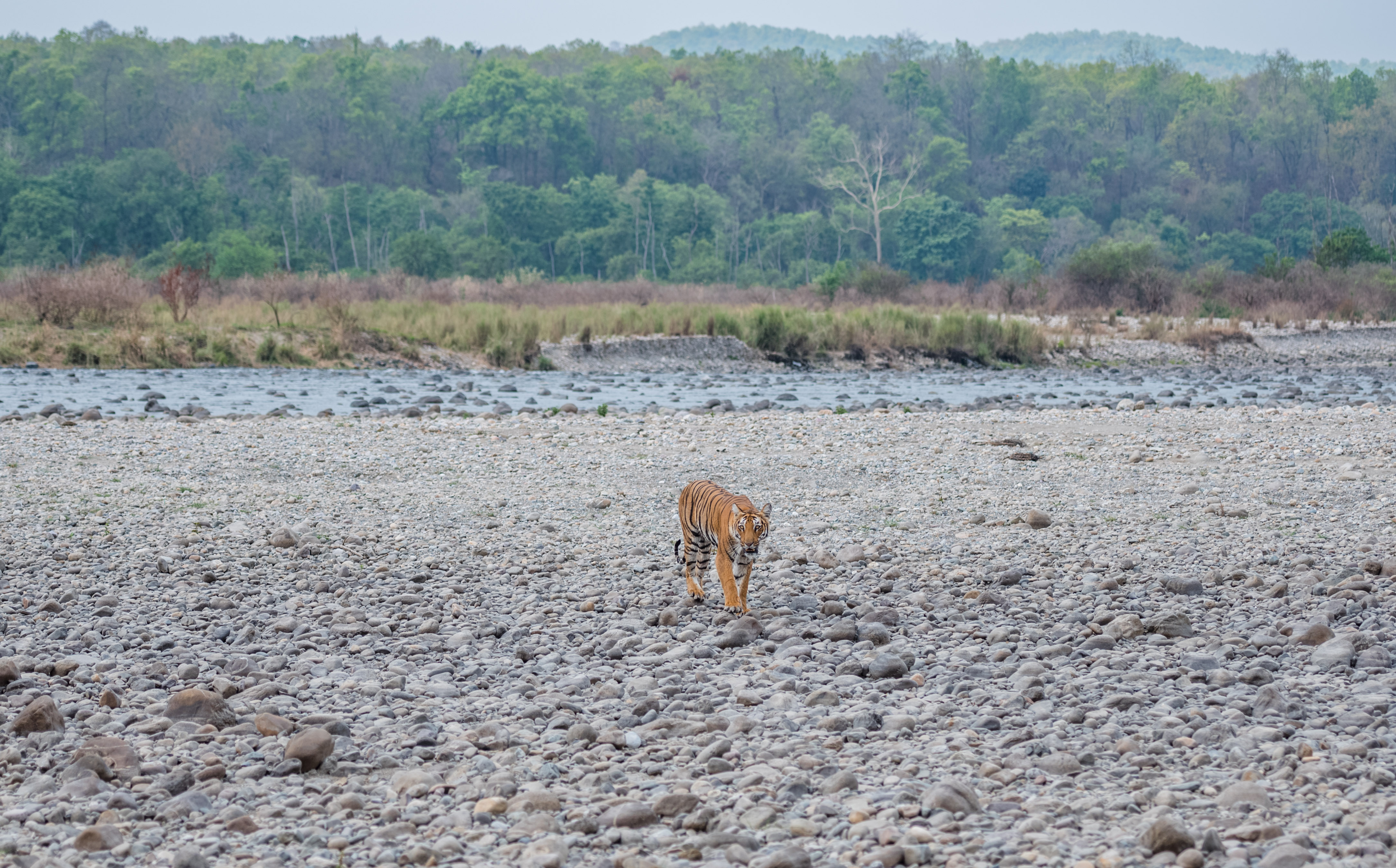
- Clockwise from top-left: Nainital Lake,Naina Devi Temple, Ayarpatta cliffs, House in Mukteshwar, Garjiya Devi, Jim Corbett National Park

- Location in Uttarakhand
- Coordinates: 29°20′N 79°30′E
- Country: India
- State: Uttarakhand
- Division: Kumaon
- Headquarters: Nainital

Government
  - District collector: Lalit Mohan Rayal IAS

Area
  - Total: 3,860 km^{2} (1,490 sq mi)

Population (2011)
  - Total: 954,605
  - Rank: 4th
  - Density: 247/km^{2} (640/sq mi)

Languages
  - Official: Hindi
  - Native: Kumaoni; Khariboli
- Time zone: UTC+5:30 (IST)
- Website: nainital.nic.in

Nainital district is a district in Kumaon division which is a part of Uttarakhand state in India. The headquarters is at Nainital.

Nainital District is located in Kumaon Division, and is located in the lower Himalayas. Haldwani is the largest city in the district.

== Geography ==
The district borders Almora and Champawat districts to the north, Udham Singh Nagar district to the south, and Bijnor district of Uttar Pradesh and Pauri Garhwal district to the west.

Nainital district is located in the Kumaon Himalaya. The district has part of the Bhabar tract in its south, which is bordered to the north by the Sivalik hills. To the north of this is the Lesser Himalayas, with a maximum altitude of 2600m. The main river in the district is the Kosi, which forms part of the border between Almora and Nainital districts before entering Nainital district proper. It then flows through Nainital district to the Ramganga.

== History ==
The southern Terai part of the district was ruled by the Panchalas during the Vedic era. Starting the first century CE, the district was part of the Kushan empire for at least 150 years. In the fourth century, Samudragupta conquered the region and the Guptas held it for the next two centuries.

After the downfall of the Kingdom of Brahmapura, the Katyuris from Joshimath established their rule over most of Kumaon including the Bhabhar parts. Starting in the middle of the 10th century, however, their power began to decline and they were eclipsed by the Chand kings of Champawat. The Chand kings generally had friendly relations with the empires to their south, but were never under their direct political control. The Chand rulers fought many wars with the Garhwal kingdom to their west. In 1790, the Gorkhas overran Kumaon including Nainital district and held it for 24 years, until the British took it in 1814 during the Anglo-Nepalese War. The region came under direct British rule and was organised into Nainital district in 1891 as part of the United Provinces.

In 1916, Govind Ballabh Pant and Har Govind Pant established the Kumaon Parishad to fight for the grassroots of Kumaoni people. After Independence, Nanital district became part of the state of Uttar Pradesh. In 2000, Nainital district was one of the districts separated to form the new state of Uttarakhand.

== Demographics ==
According to the 2011 census, Nainital district has a population of 954,605. The district has a population density of 225 inhabitants per square kilometre (580/sq mi), and a population growth rate over the preceding decade at 25.1%. It has a sex ratio of 934 females for every 1000 males, and a literacy rate of 83.9%. Scheduled Castes and Scheduled Tribes make up 20.02% and 0.79% of the population respectively.

Religions in Nainital district (2011)
Religion	Percent
Hinduism	84.82%
Islam	12.65%
Sikhism	1.82%
Christianity	0.53%
Other or not stated	0.18%
Distribution of religions

As of 2011 Indian census, Nainital district had 809,717 (84.82%) Hindus, 120,742 (12.65%) Muslims, and 17,419 (1.82%) Sikhs.

Historical population
Year	Pop.	±% p.a.
1901	182,284	—
1911	182,016	−0.01%
1921	155,790	−1.54%
1931	156,034	+0.02%
1941	164,244	+0.51%
1951	188,736	+1.40%
1961	259,685	+3.24%
1971	319,697	+2.10%
1981	441,436	+3.28%
1991	574,832	+2.68%
2001	762,909	+2.87%
2011	954,605	+2.27%

Nainital district: mother-tongue of population, according to the 2011 Indian Census.
Mother tongue code	Mother tongue	People	Percentage
002007	Bengali	4,174	0.4%
006102	Bhojpuri	6,688	0.7%
006195	Garhwali	15,348	1.6%
006240	Hindi	369,373	38.7%
006340	Kumauni	462,493	48.4%
006439	Pahari	683	0.1%
014011	Nepali	5,984	0.6%
016038	Punjabi	19,644	2.1%
022015	Urdu	63,170	6.6%
053005	Gujari	1,416	0.1%
–	Others	5,632	0.6%
Total		954,605	100.0%

=== Languages ===
Languages of Nainital district (2011)
1. Kumaoni (48.5%)
2. Hindi (38.7%)
3. Urdu (6.62%)
4. Punjabi (2.06%)
5. Garhwali (1.61%)
6. Others (2.57%)

At the time of the 2011 Census of India, the major first languages of the population were Kumaoni (48%), Native regional languages include Khariboli (dialect of Hindi or Hindustani) Hindi (39%), Urdu (6.6%), Punjabi (2.1%), Garhwali (1.6%), Bhojpuri (0.70%), and Nepali (0.63%). There are also speakers of Buksa, found in a number of villages in Ramnagar development block.

== Assembly Constituencies ==
1. Lalkuan
2. Bhimtal
3. Nainital (SC)
4. Haldwani
5. Kaladhungi
6. Ramnagar

== Villages ==
- Aampokhra Range, Nainital
- Amgarhi
- Simalkha
